= Portrait of Robert Vernon =

Painting by Henry William Pickersgill

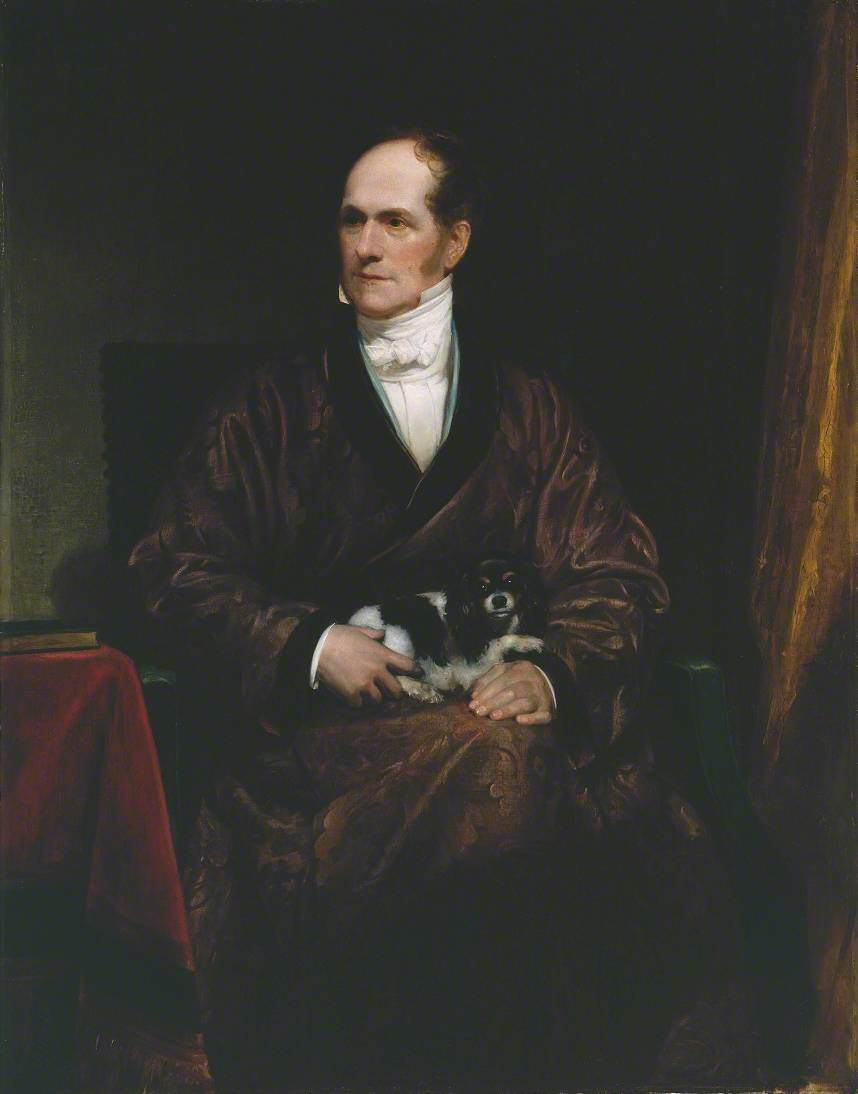
- Artist: Henry William Pickersgill
- Year: 1846
- Type: Oil on canvas, portrait painting
- Dimensions: 142.2 cm × 111.8 cm (56.0 in × 44.0 in)
- Location: Tate Britain, London

Portrait of Robert Vernon is an oil on canvas portrait painting by the British artist Henry William Pickersgill, from 1846.

== History and description ==
It depicts the English businessman and art collector Robert Vernon. Vernon has made a fortune supplying horses to the British Army during the Napoleonic Wars and was known for collecting contemporary British art in preference to Old Masters. He is shown seated informally with a dog on his lap.

The painting was displayed at the Royal Academy Exhibition of 1847 held at the National Gallery in London. The same year Vernon made the large Vernon Gift of artwork to the nation which included this picture. Today the painting is in the collection of Tate Britain in Pimlico.

An engraving based on the painting was produced by William Henry Mote and it is now in the National Galleries of Scotland, in Edinburgh.

== Bibliography ==
- Hamlyn, Robin. Robert Vernon's Gift: British Art for the Nation 1847. Tate Gallery, 1993.
