= West Front of Antwerp Cathedral =

Painting by David Roberts

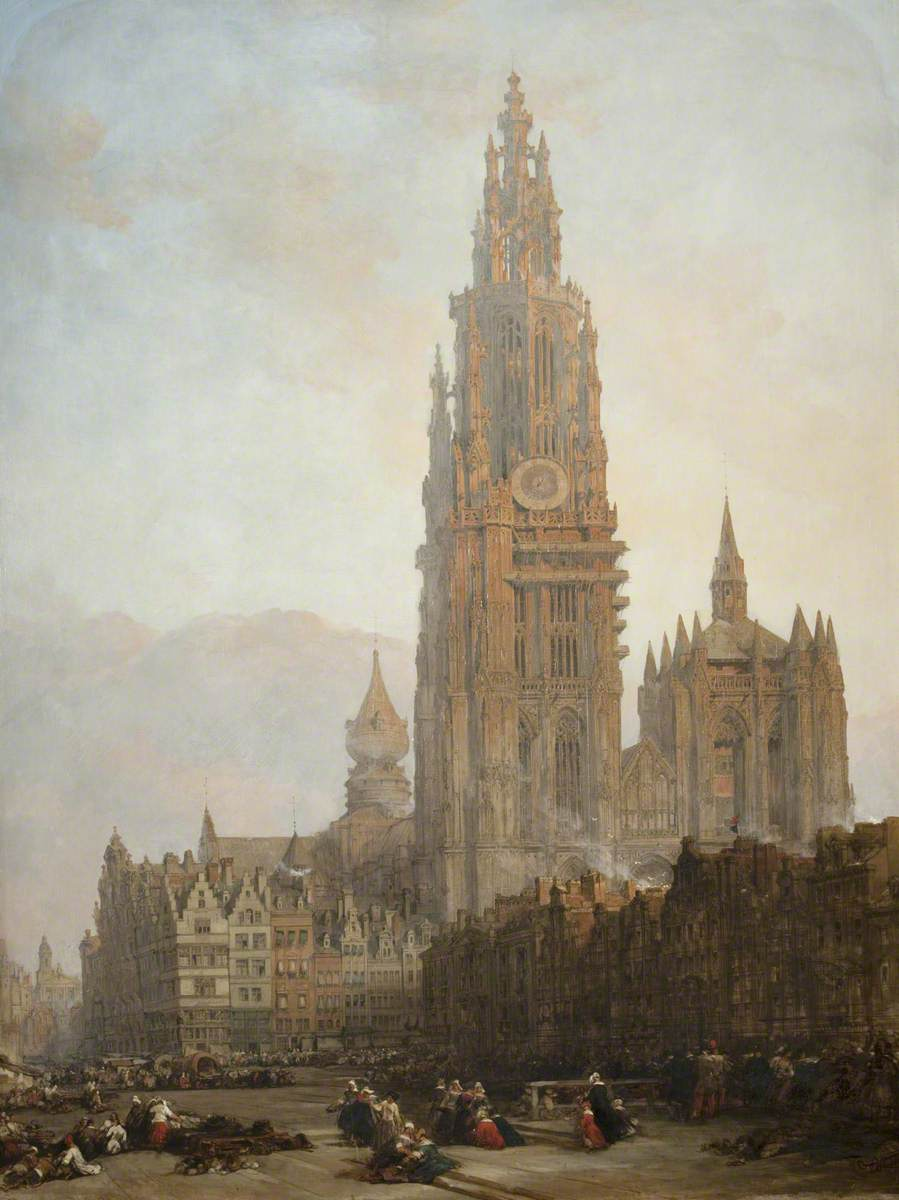
- Artist: David Roberts
- Year: 1847
- Type: Oil on panel, landscape painting
- Dimensions: 141 cm × 100.5 cm (56 in × 39.6 in)
- Location: Harris Museum, Preston

West Front of Antwerp Cathedral is an 1847 oil painting by the British artist David Roberts. It depicts a view of Cathedral of Our Lady capturing the Gothic architecture and the one finished spire. Although Roberts is best knowns for his depictions of the Middle East and Spain, he also produced a series of works featuring the Low Countries. Roberts produced five views of the exterior from different angles, including one now in the Guildhall Art Gallery created in 1860.

The painting was displayed at the Royal Academy Exhibition of 1847 held at the National Gallery in London and also at an exhibition held by the Liverpool Academy of Arts the same year. Although it was originally commissioned by Lord Northwick he decided he already owned too many paintings by Roberts and instead it was purchased by Richard Newsham. Today it is in the collection of the Harris Museum in Preston, which acquired it in 1883.

== Bibliography ==
- Guiterman Helen & Llewellyn, Briony. David Roberts. Phaidon Press, 1986.
- Sim, Katherine. David Roberts R.A., 1796–1864: A Biography. Quartet Books, 1984.
