= Portrait of Daniel Maclise =

Painting by Edward Matthew Ward

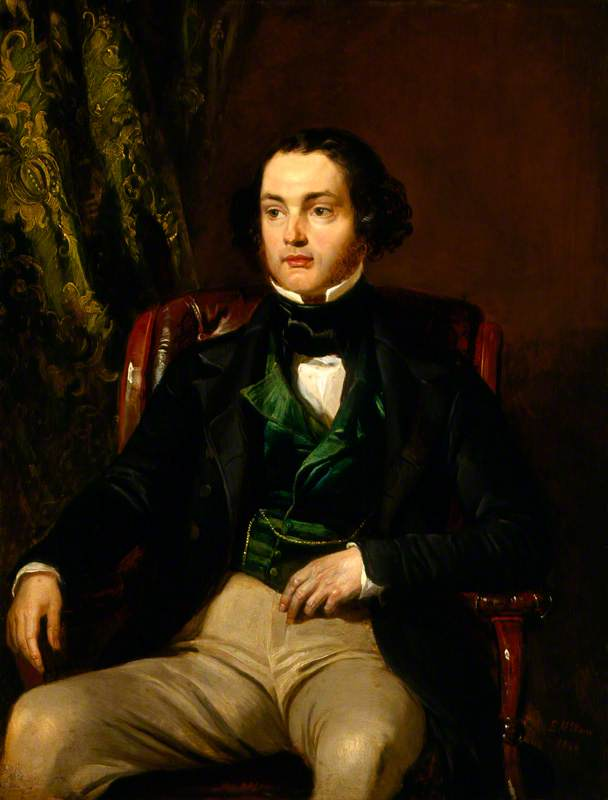
- Artist: Edward Matthew Ward
- Year: 1846
- Type: Oil on panel, portrait painting
- Dimensions: 45.7 cm × 35.2 cm (18.0 in × 13.9 in)
- Location: National Portrait Gallery, London

Portrait of Daniel Maclise is an 1846 portrait painting by the English artist Edward Matthew Ward. It depicts the Irish painter Daniel Maclise, known for his history paintings produced during the Victorian era. The Cork-born Maclise as closely associated with Charles Dickens and other painters such as Clarkson Stanfield and Edwin Landseer.

Ward was himself a member of the art group The Clique. The picture was displayed at the Royal Academy Exhibition of 1847 held at the National Gallery in London. Today it is in the National Portrait Gallery, having been acquired in 1880 through a gift from George Scharf. An engraving based on it was produced by John Talfourd Smyth for The Art Journal in 1847.

== Bibliography ==
- Murray, Peter. Daniel Maclise, 1806-1870: Romancing the Past. University of Michigan, 2008
- Ormond, Richard. Early Victorian Portraits, National Portrait Gallery, 1974.
- Weston, Nancy. Daniel Maclise: Irish Artist in Victorian London. Four Courts Press, 2001.
