= The Hero of a Hundred Fights =

Painting by J. M. W. Turner

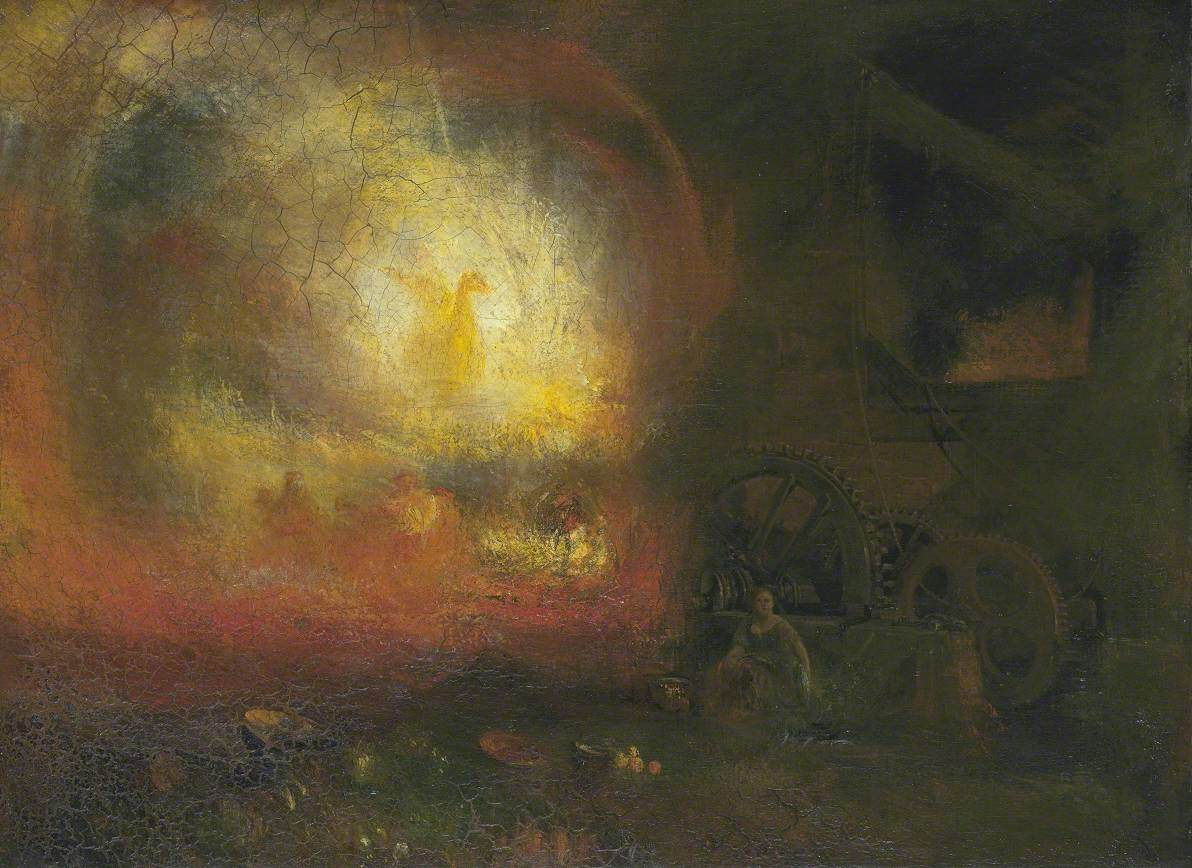
- Artist: J.M.W. Turner
- Year: 1847
- Type: Oil on canvas, genre painting
- Dimensions: 90.8 cm × 121.3 cm (35.7 in × 47.8 in)
- Location: Tate Britain; London

The Hero of a Hundred Fights is an 1847 oil painting by the British artist J.M.W. Turner. It depicts the production of a statue of the Duke of Wellington, known for his victories in the Napoleonic Wars.

Turner reworked an earlier painting he had produced during the first decade of the century which featured machinery. The reworked painting was inspired by the 1845 casting of the bronze equestrian statue of the Duke of Wellington which was erected on the Wellington Arch at Hyde Park Corner.

It was Turner's only submission to the Royal Academy's Summer Exhibition of 1847 at the National Gallery in Trafalgar Square. Part of the Turner Bequest, it is today in the collection of the Tate Britain.

== See also ==
- List of paintings by J. M. W. Turner

== Bibliography ==
- Bailey, Anthony. J.M.W. Turner: Standing in the Sun. Tate Enterprises Ltd, 2013.
- Finley, Gerald. Angel in the Sun: Turner's Vision of History. McGill-Queen's University Press, 2019.
- Hamilton, James. Turner's Britain. Merrell, 2003.
- Moyle, Franny. Turner: The Extraordinary Life and Momentous Times of J. M. W. Turner. Penguin Books, 2016.
- Reynolds, Graham. Turner. Thames & Hudson, 2022.
