= The Village Holiday (Goodall) =

Painting by Frederick Goodall

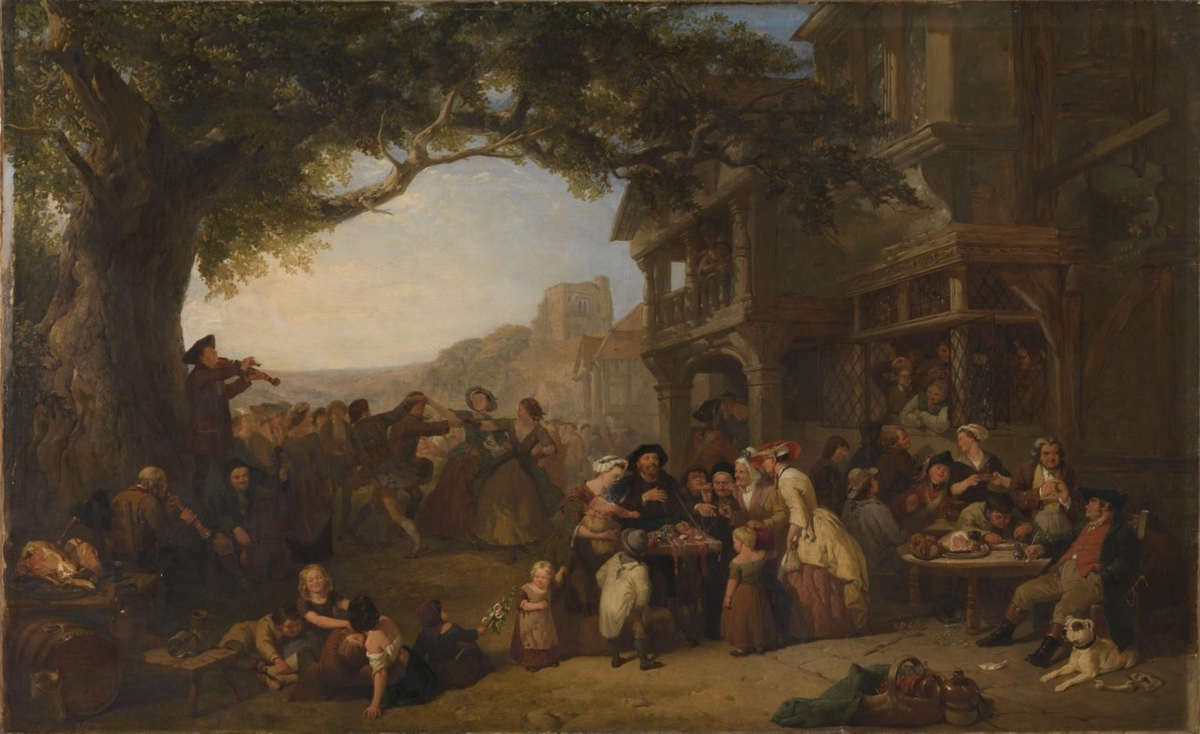
- Artist: Frederick Goodall
- Year: 1847
- Type: Oil on canvas, genre painting
- Dimensions: 172.5 cm × 106.7 cm (67.9 in × 42.0 in)
- Location: Tate Britain, London

The Village Holiday is an 1847 oil painting by the British artist Frederick Goodall. A genre painting is shows traditional festivities in an English village some years before. Nostalgic scenes of rural life were very popular on the early Victorian Era, when the Industrial Revolution had rapidly altered ways of living. It should not be confused with David Wilkie's 1811 painting The Village Holiday, which Goodall had himself produced a copy of in 1842.

Produced near the beginning of his career Goodall became a prominent artist, particularly known for Orientalist scenes. The painting was displayed at the Royal Academy Exhibition of 1847 held at the National Gallery in London. It was acquired by the businessman and art collector Robert Vernon for the large sun of 500 guineas. The same year he presented it to the nation as part of his large Vernon Gift and it now forms part of the collection of the Tate Britain. In 1850 a print based on the picture was produced by the engraver James Carter for The Art Journal.

== Bibliography ==
- Boos, Florence. History and Community: Essays in Victorian Medievalism. Routledge, 2016.
- Hamlyn, Robin. Robert Vernon's Gift: British Art for the Nation 1847. Tate Gallery Publications, 1993.
