= Royal Academy Exhibition of 1847 =

1847 art exhibition in London

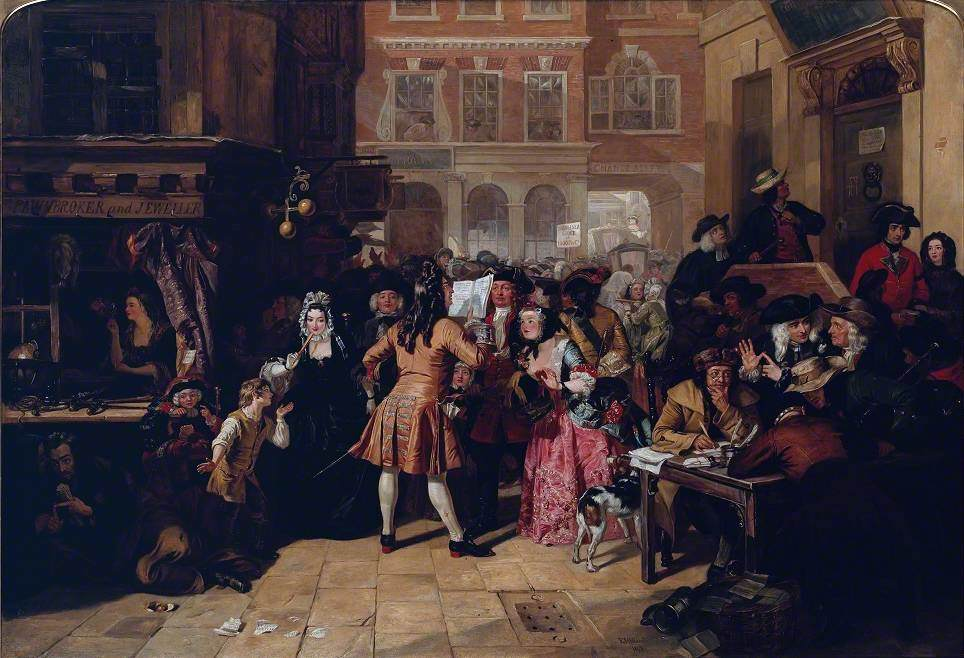
The South Sea Bubble by Edward Matthew Ward

The Royal Academy Exhibition of 1847 was an art exhibition held in London. It was the seventy ninth annual Summer Exhibition held by the British Royal Academy of Arts. It took place at the National Gallery between 3 May and 24 July 1847 and featured many of the leading painters, sculptors and architects of the early Victorian era. While Martin Archer Shee was the President of the Royal Academy, he was deputised in the role by J.M.W. Turner. Amongst the works Turner himself displayed was The Hero of a Hundred Fights, a tribute to the Duke of Wellington.

The exhibition reflected the growing prominence of the art group The Clique. Edward Matthew Ward displayed his Hogarthian history painting The South Sea Bubble. Romanticism continued to be strongly represented. Edwin Landseer's The Deer Drive features a scene in the Scottish Highlands. Clarkson Stanfield's French Troops Fording the Magra combined landscape with history by showing a scene from the French Revolutionary Wars. William Etty showed a trilogy of paintings with scenes from the life of Joan of Arc. The future Pre-Raphaelite William Holman Hunt submitted Dr Rochecliffe Performing Divine Service in the Cottage of Joceline Joliffe, a scene from Walter Scott's novel Woodstock. John Everett Millais also entered a single, early work Elgiva Seized by Order of Archbishop Odo. The French artist Paul Delaroche exhibited a version of Napoleon at Fontainebleau.

In portraiture Henry William Pickersgill displayed his Portrait of Robert Vernon, depicting the noted art collector who the same year presented the large Vernon Gift of artworks to the nation including this picture. Francis Grant's Portrait of Sidney Herbert has been described as one of his finest portraits. In addition he exhibited a portrait of the railway tycoon George Hudson.

== Gallery ==
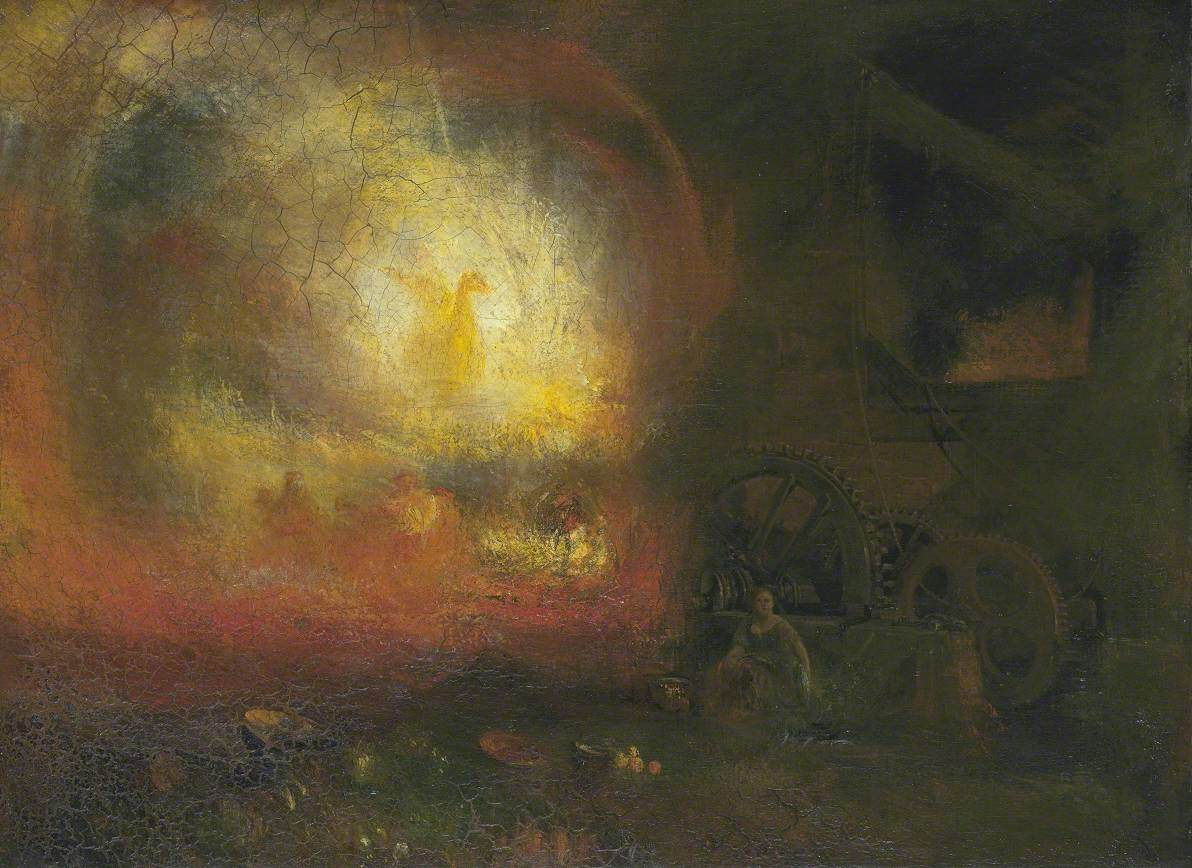
The Hero of a Hundred Fights by J.M.W. Turner

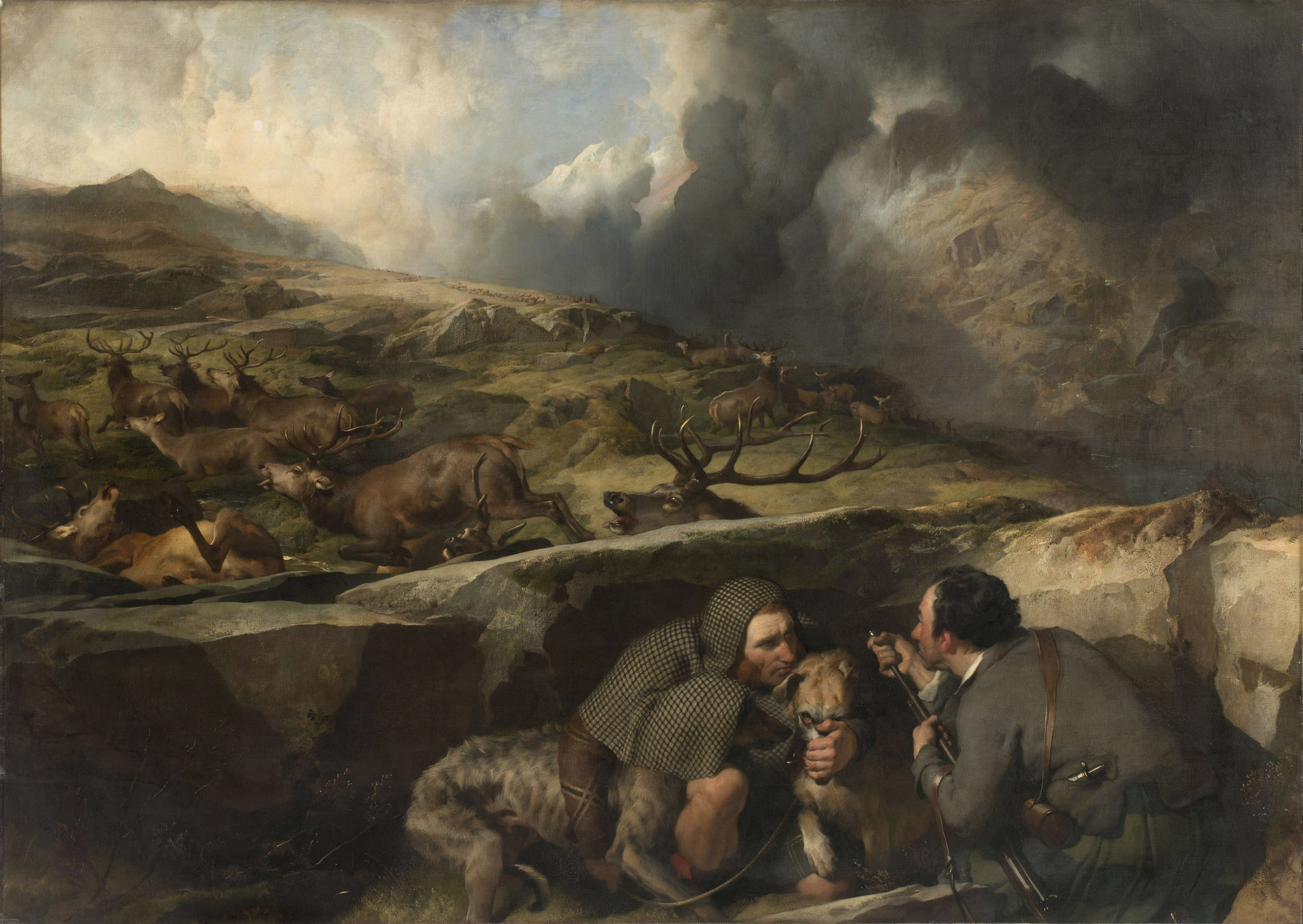
The Deer Drive by Edwin Landseer

French Troops Fording the Magra by Clarkson Stanfield

On the Zuyder Zee by Clarkson Stanfield

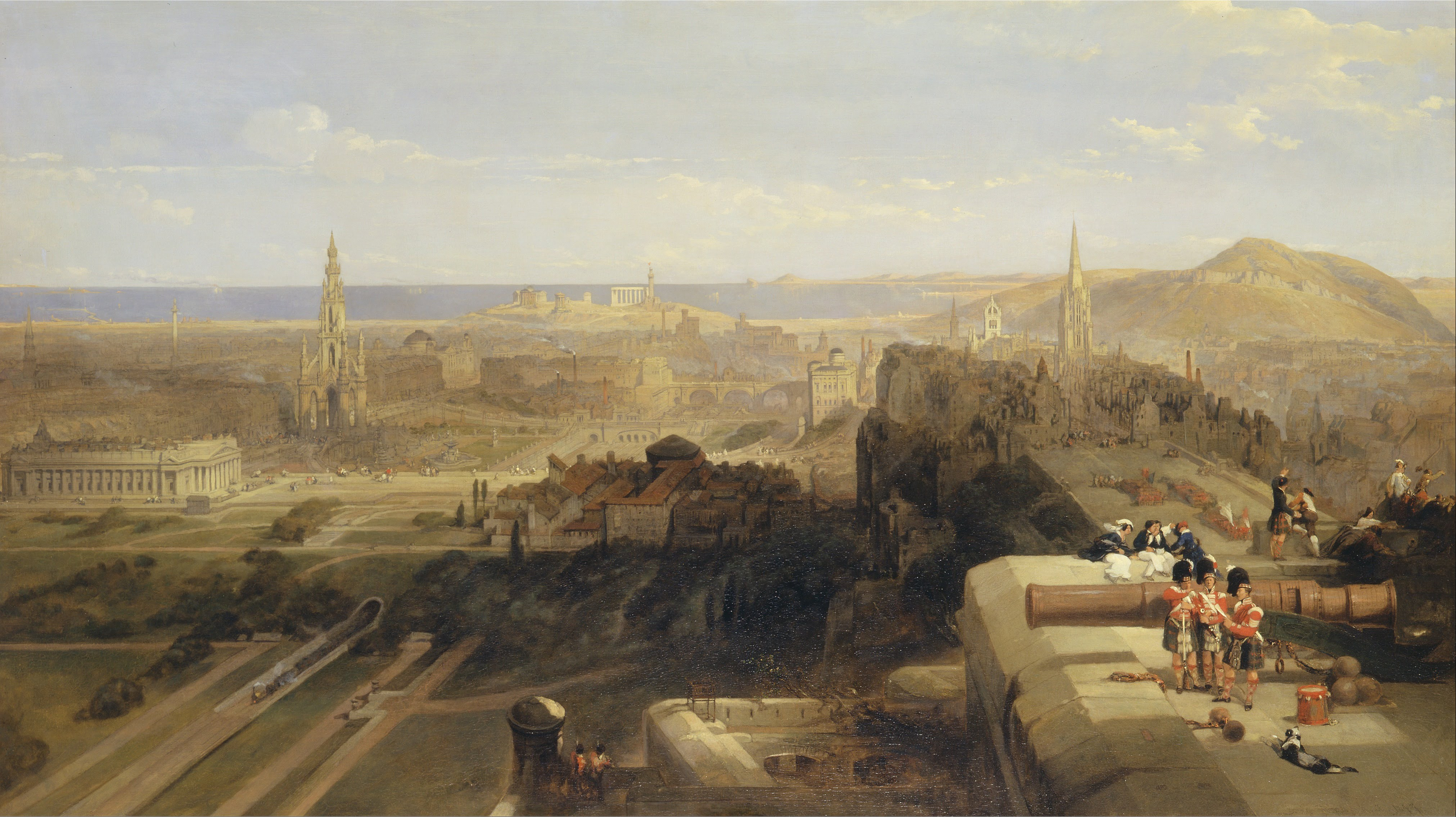
Edinburgh from the Castle by David Roberts

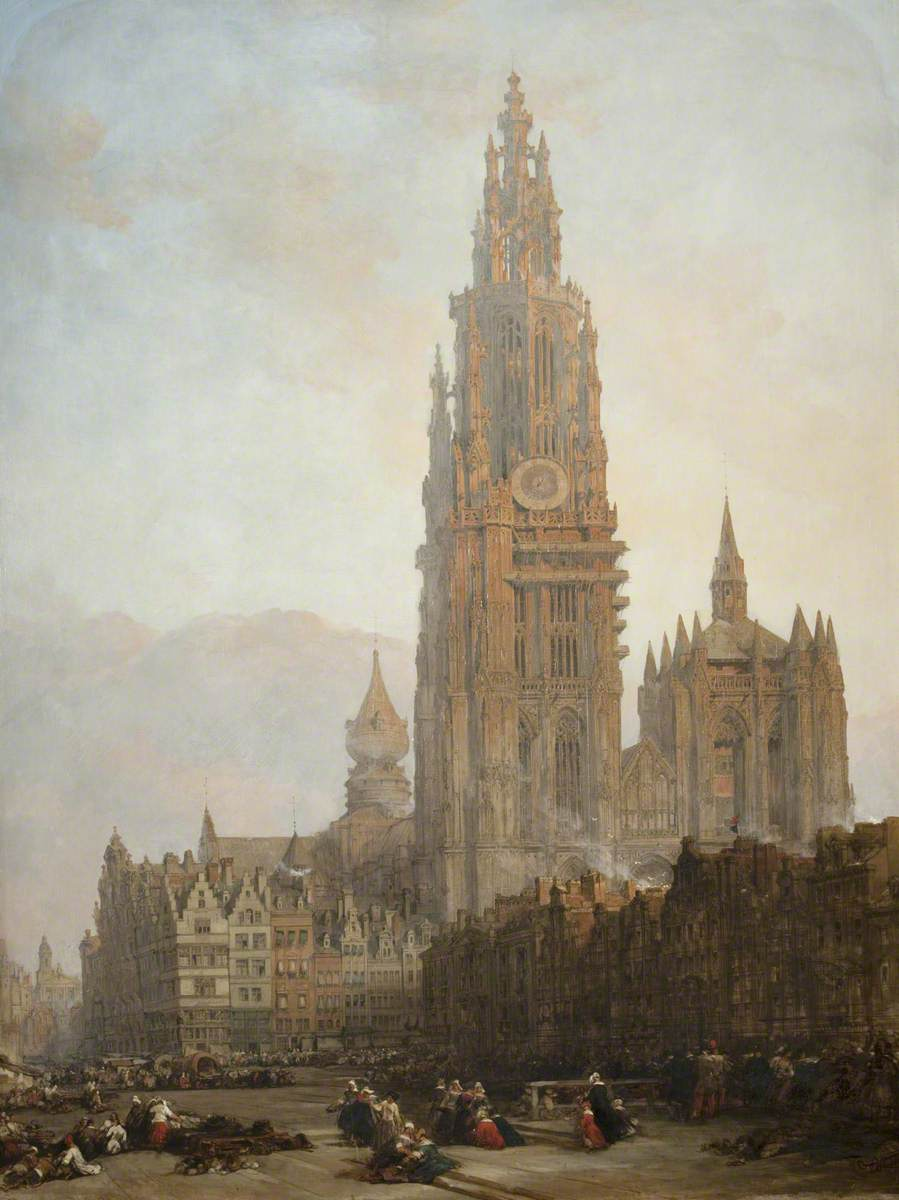
West Front of Antwerp Cathedral by David Roberts

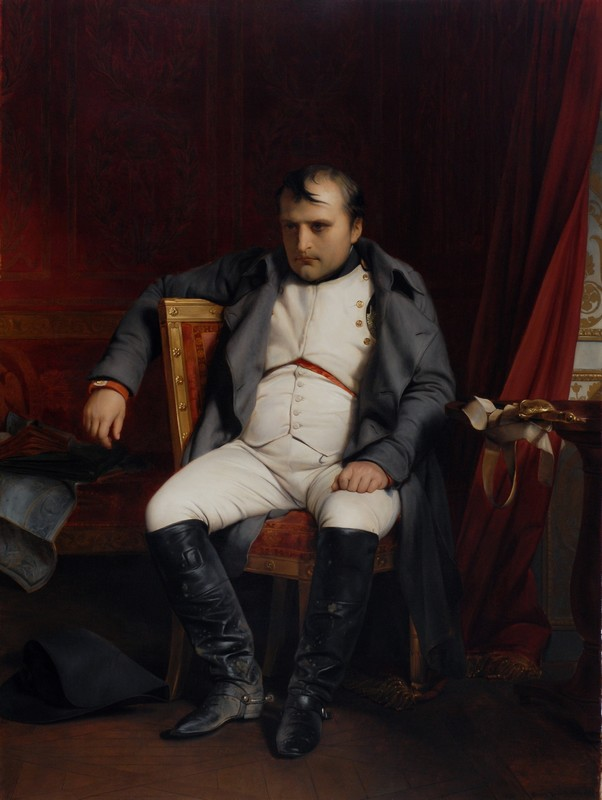
Napoleon at Fontainebleau by Paul Delaroche

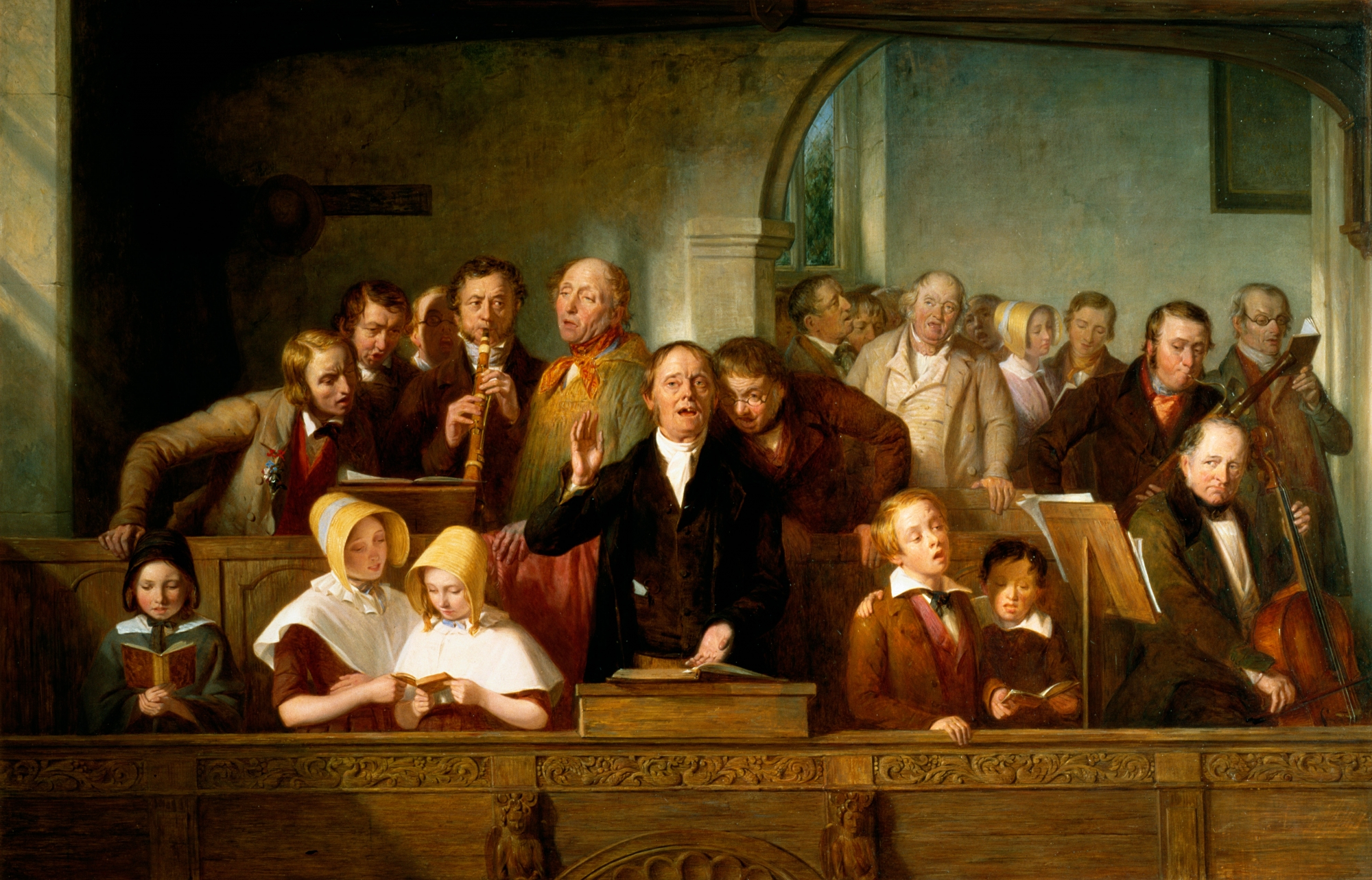
A Village Choir by Thomas Webster

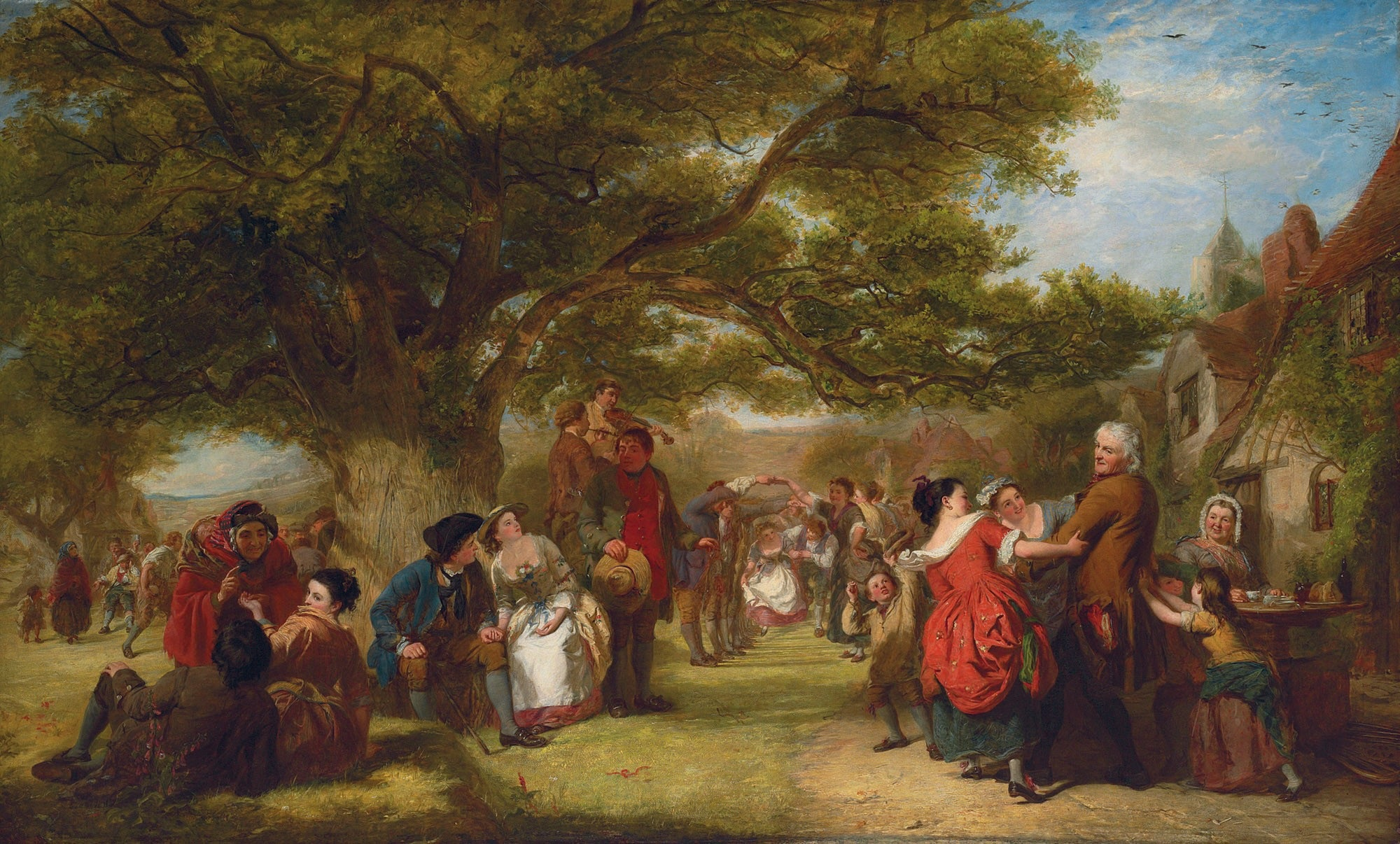
An English Merrymaking a Hundred Years Ago by William Powell Frith

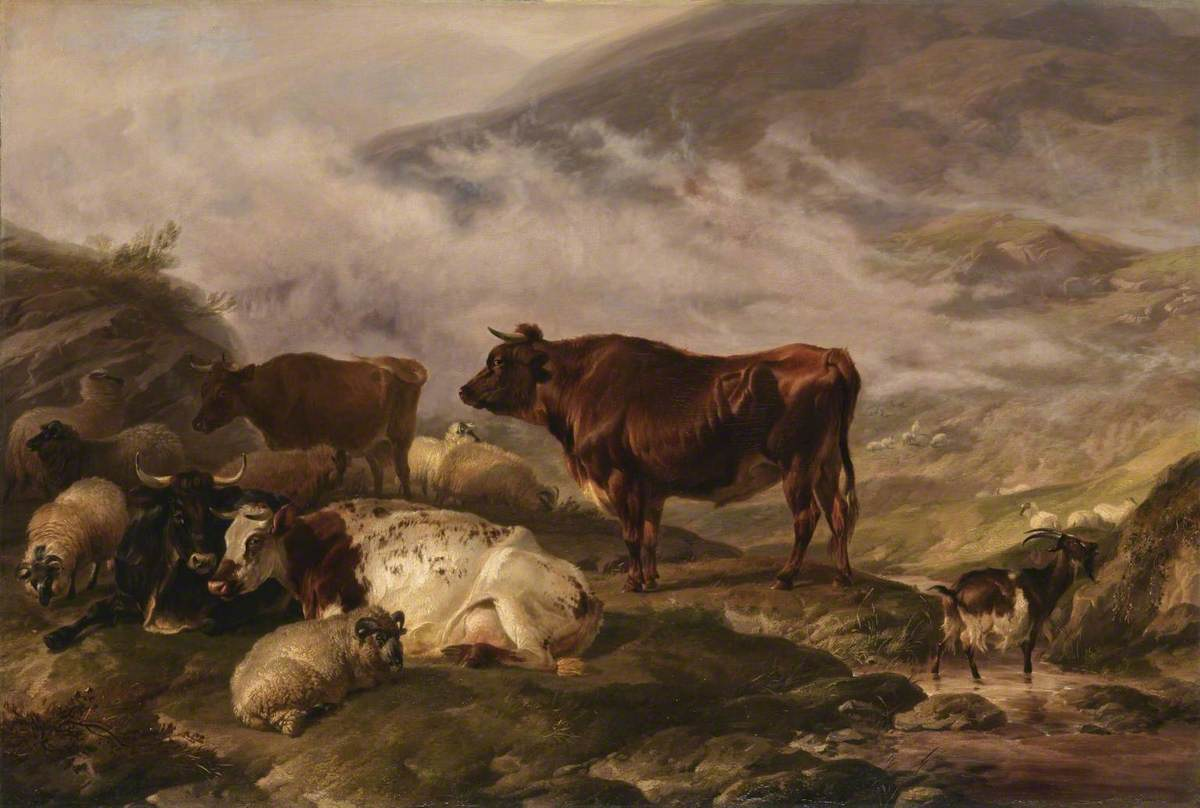
Among the Cumberland Mountains by Thomas Sidney Cooper

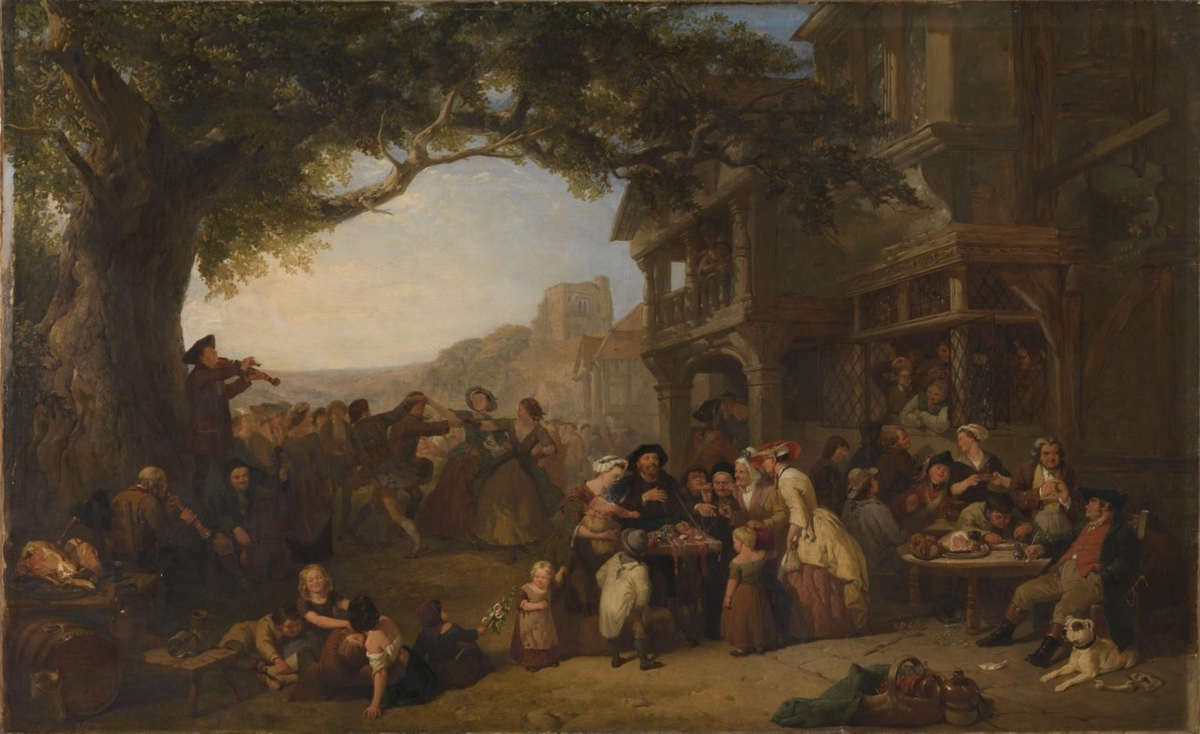
The Village Holiday by Frederick Goodall

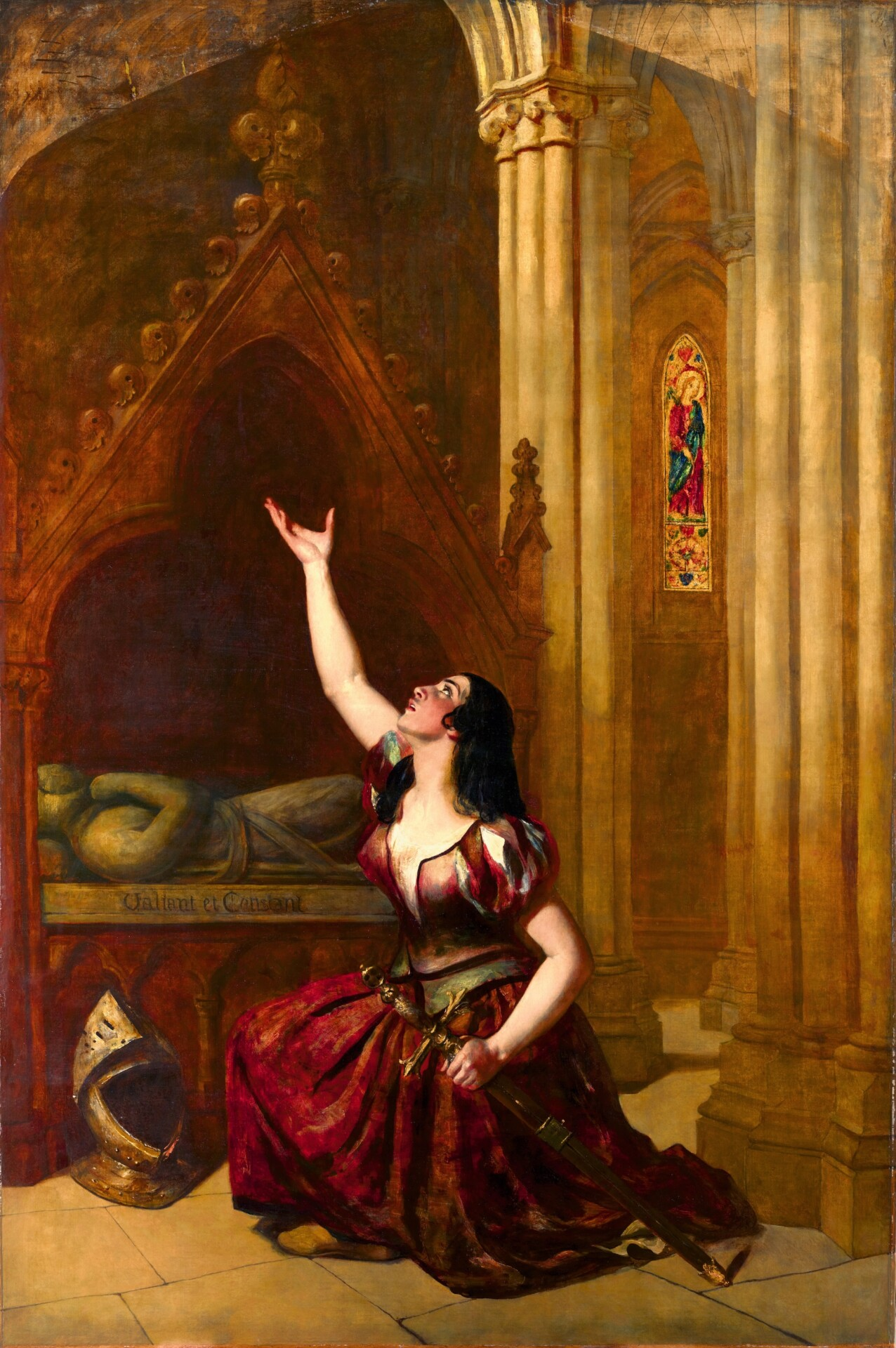
Joan of Arc by William Etty

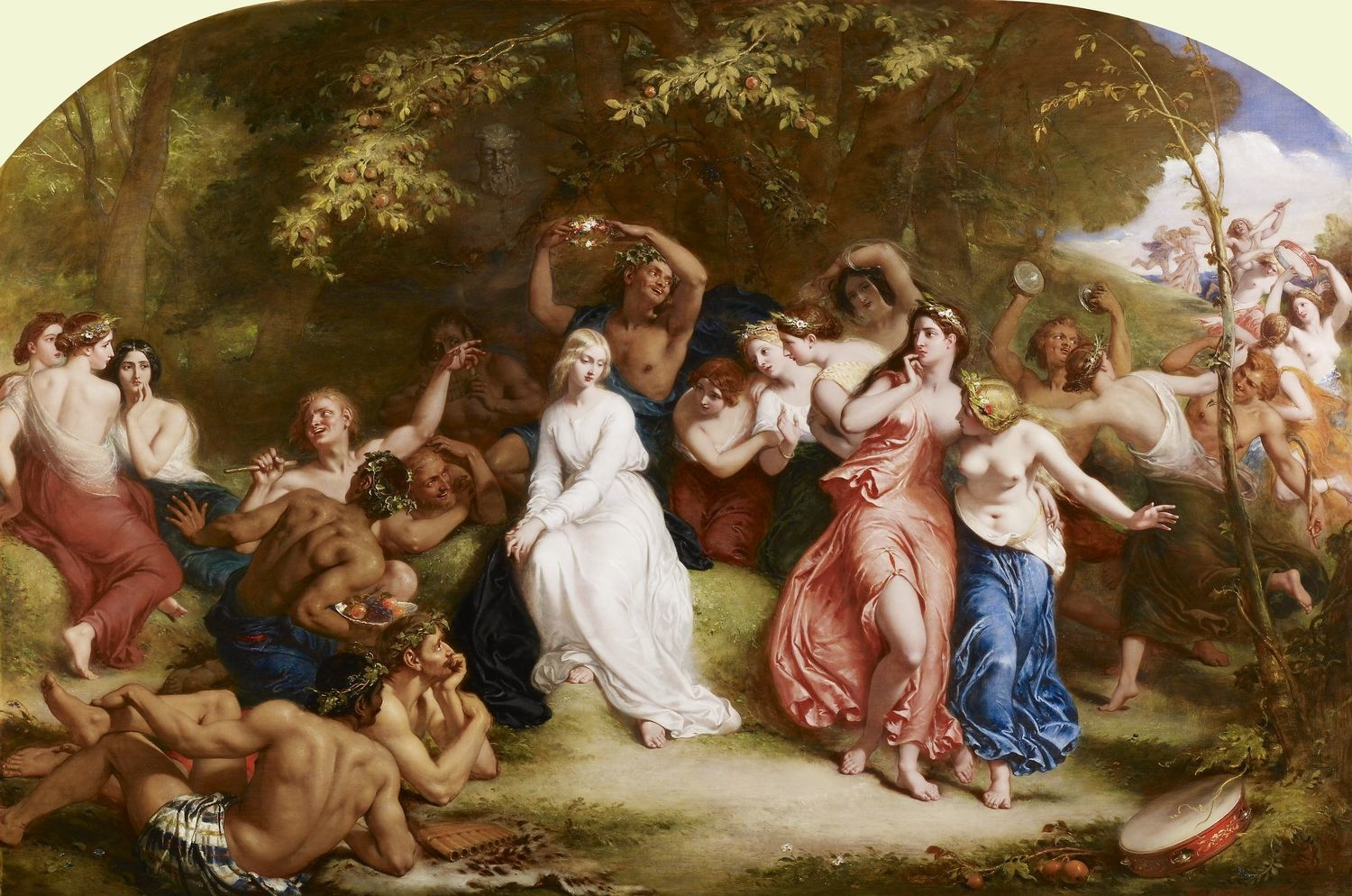
Una Among the Fauns and Wood Nymphs by William Edward Frost

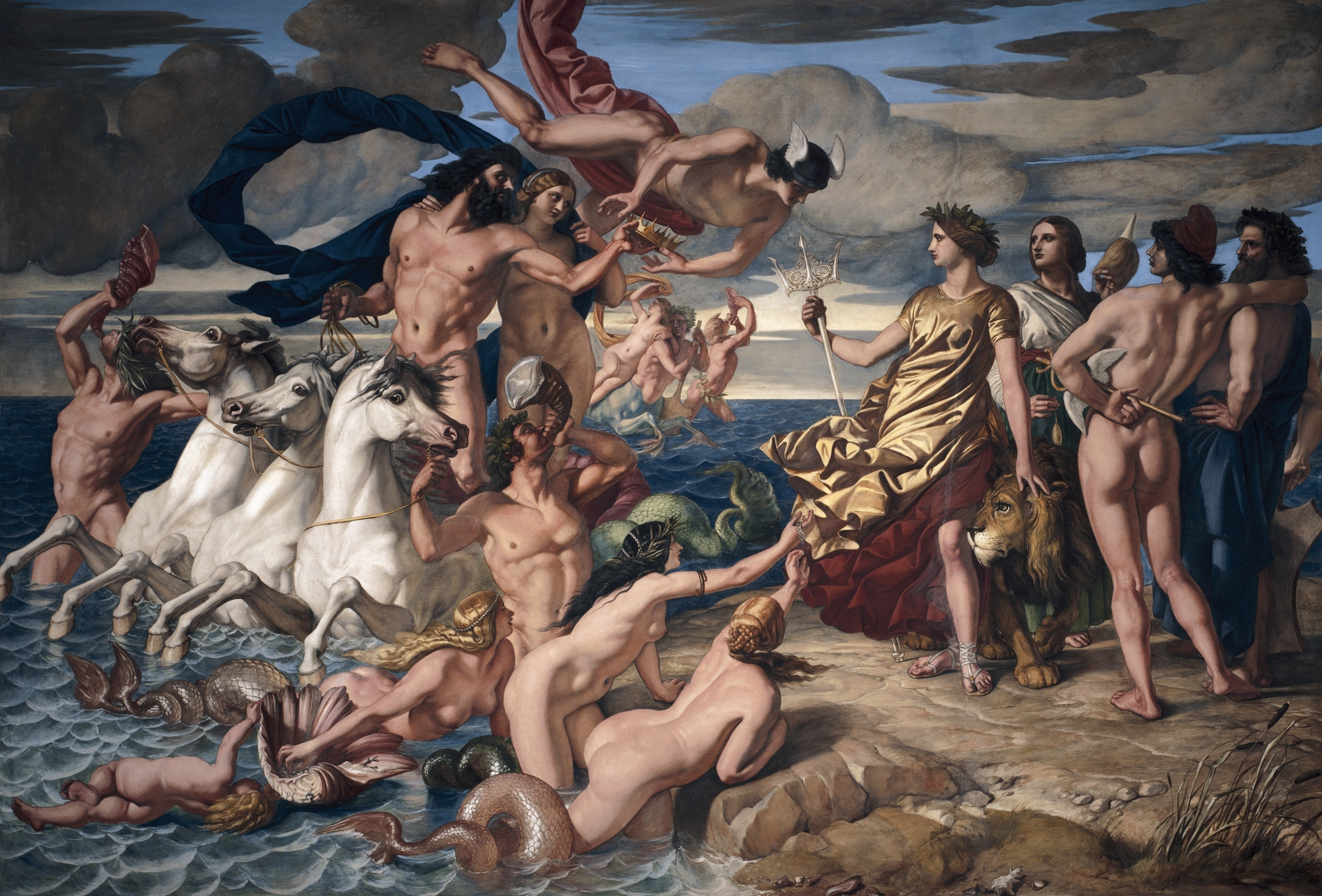
Neptune Resigning to Britannia the Empire of the Sea by William Dyce

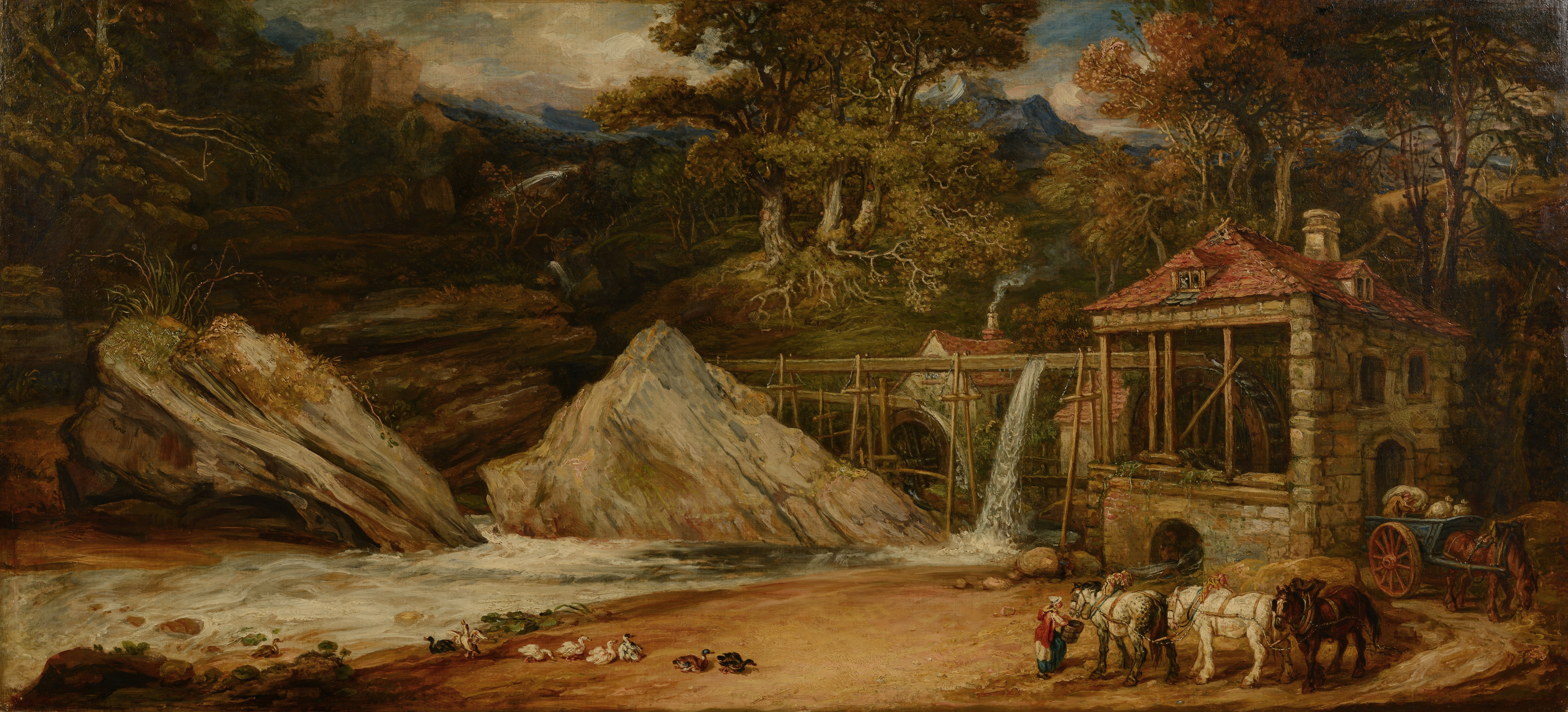
An Overshot Mill in Aberdulais, Wales by James Ward

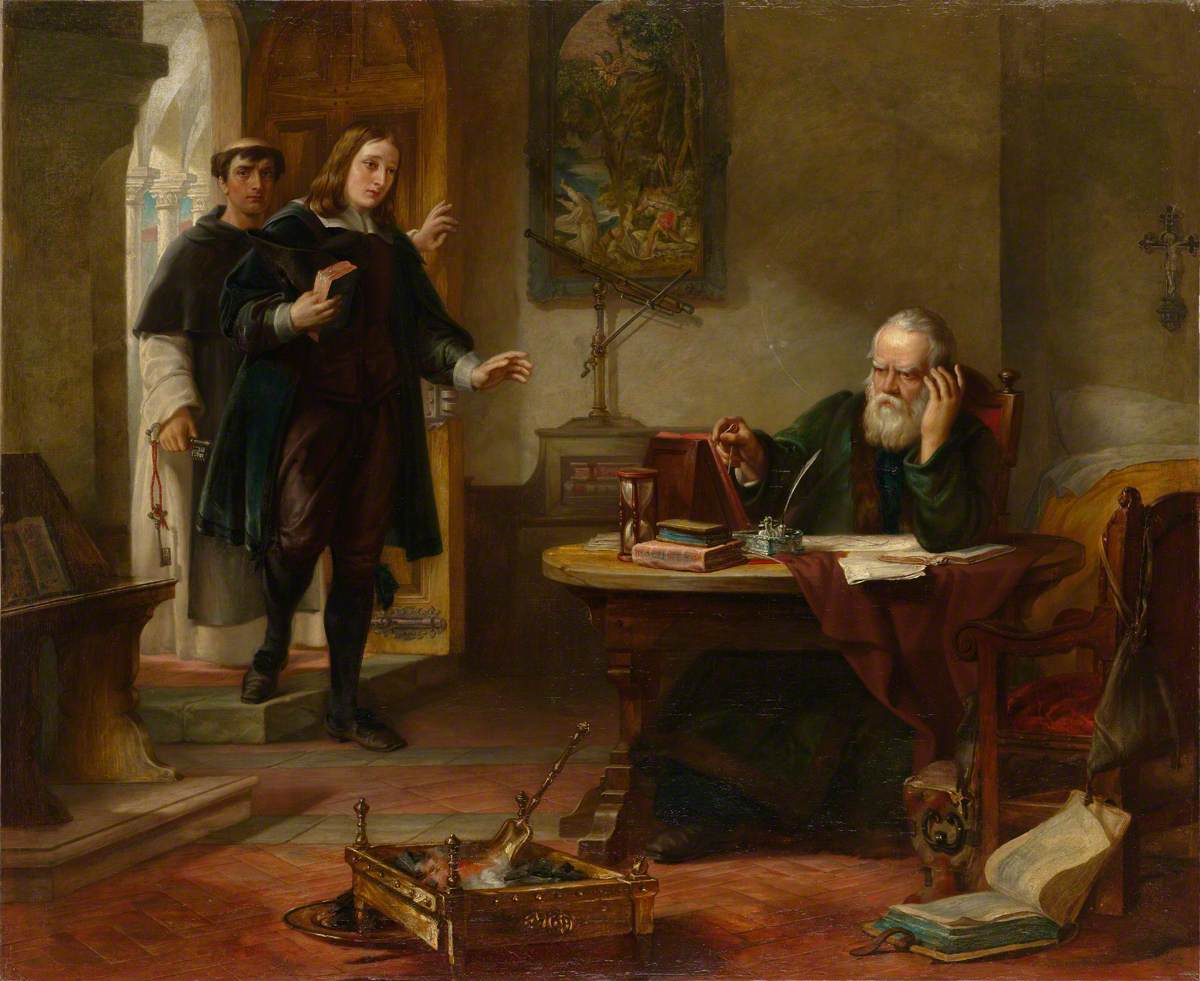
John Milton Visiting Galileo When a Prisoner of the Inquisition by Solomon Hart

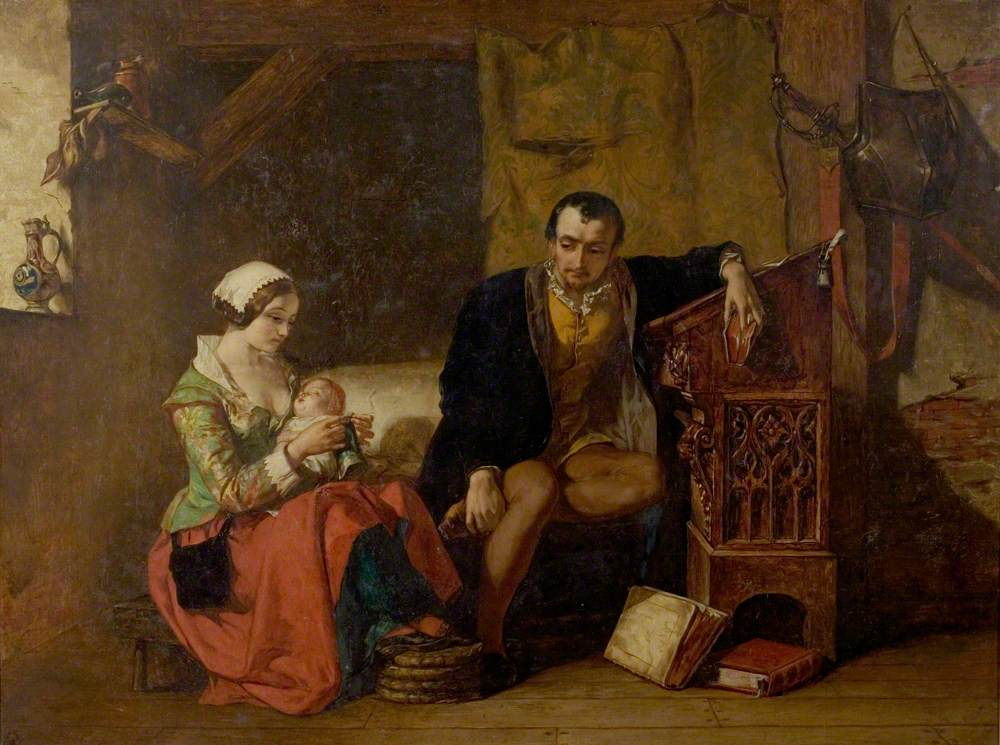
The Origin of the Stocking Loom by Alfred Elmore

The Charity Boy's Debut by James Collinson

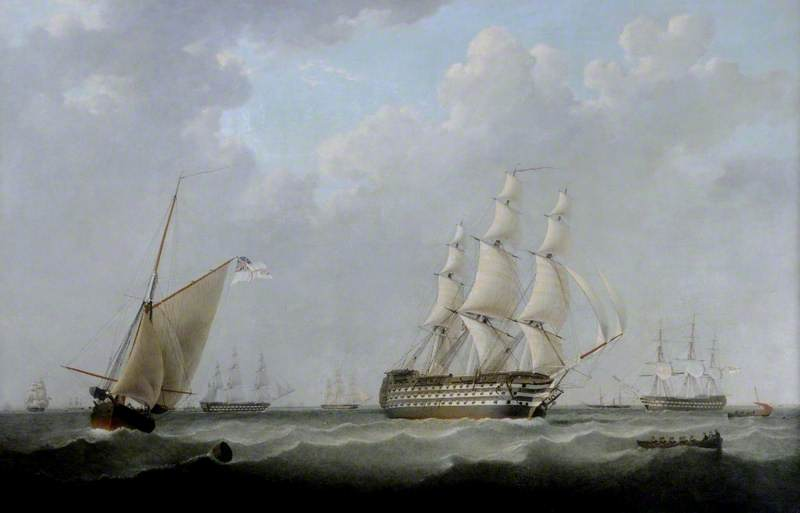
Warships off Spithead by John Ward

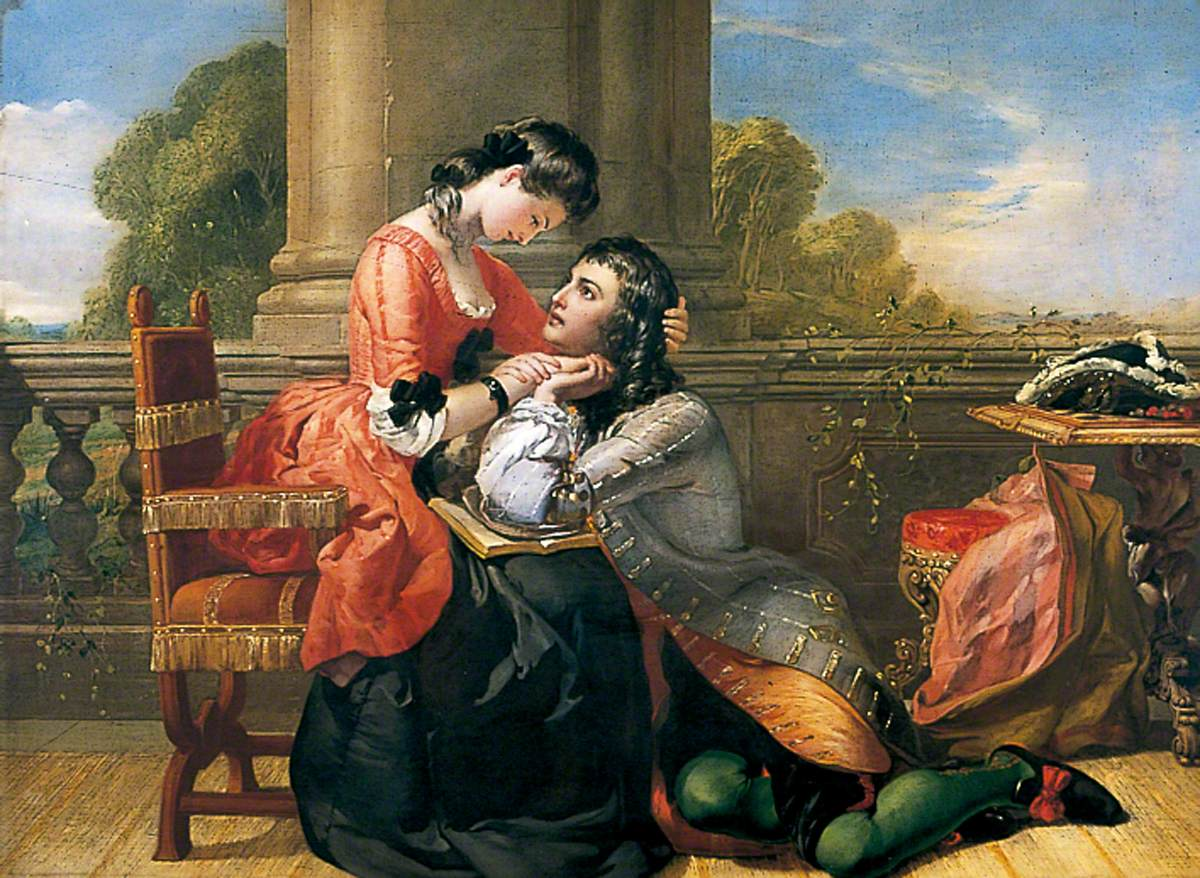
Mated by Frank Stone

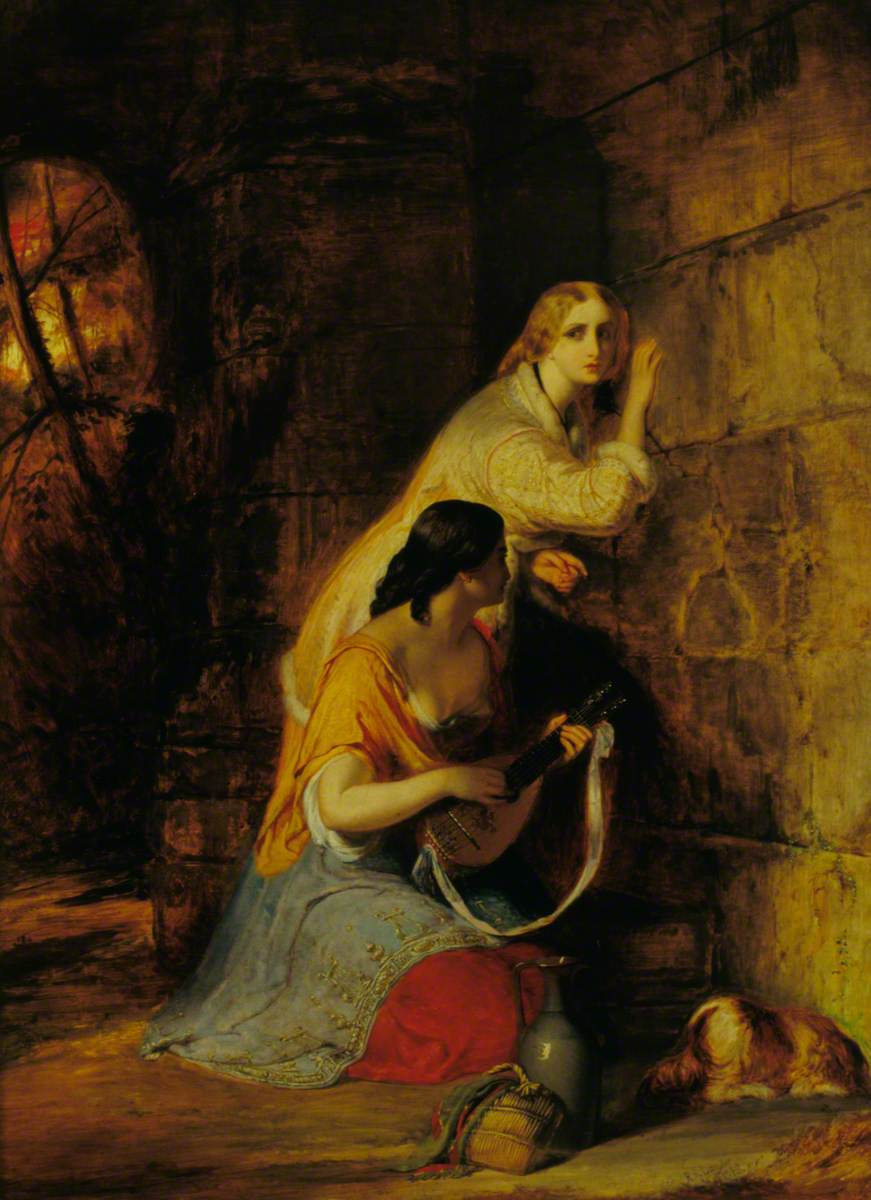
The Fair Maid of Perth at the Dungeon Wall by Robert Scott Lauder

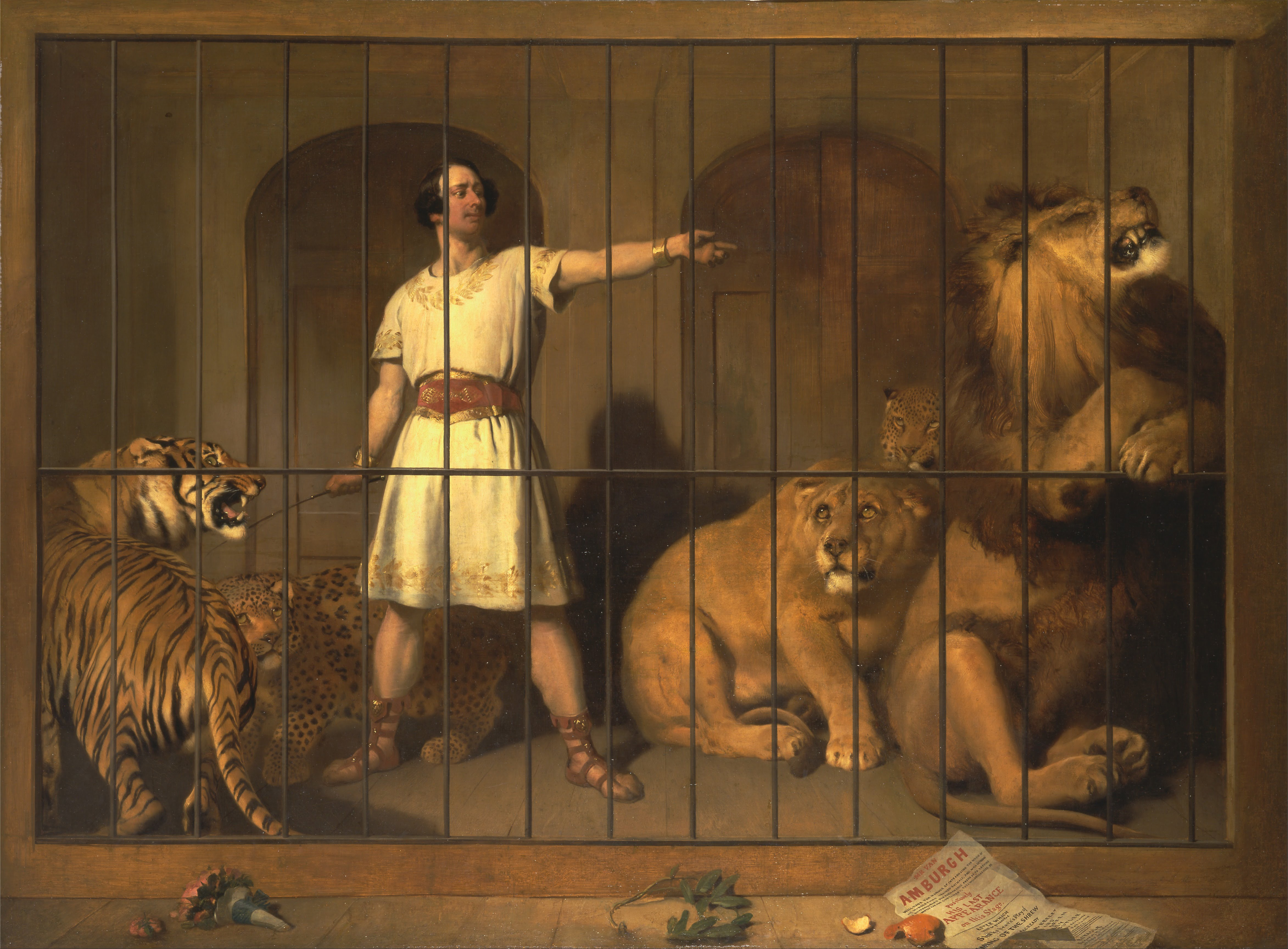
Isaac van Amburgh and His Animals by Edwin Landseer

The Combat by Richard Ansdell

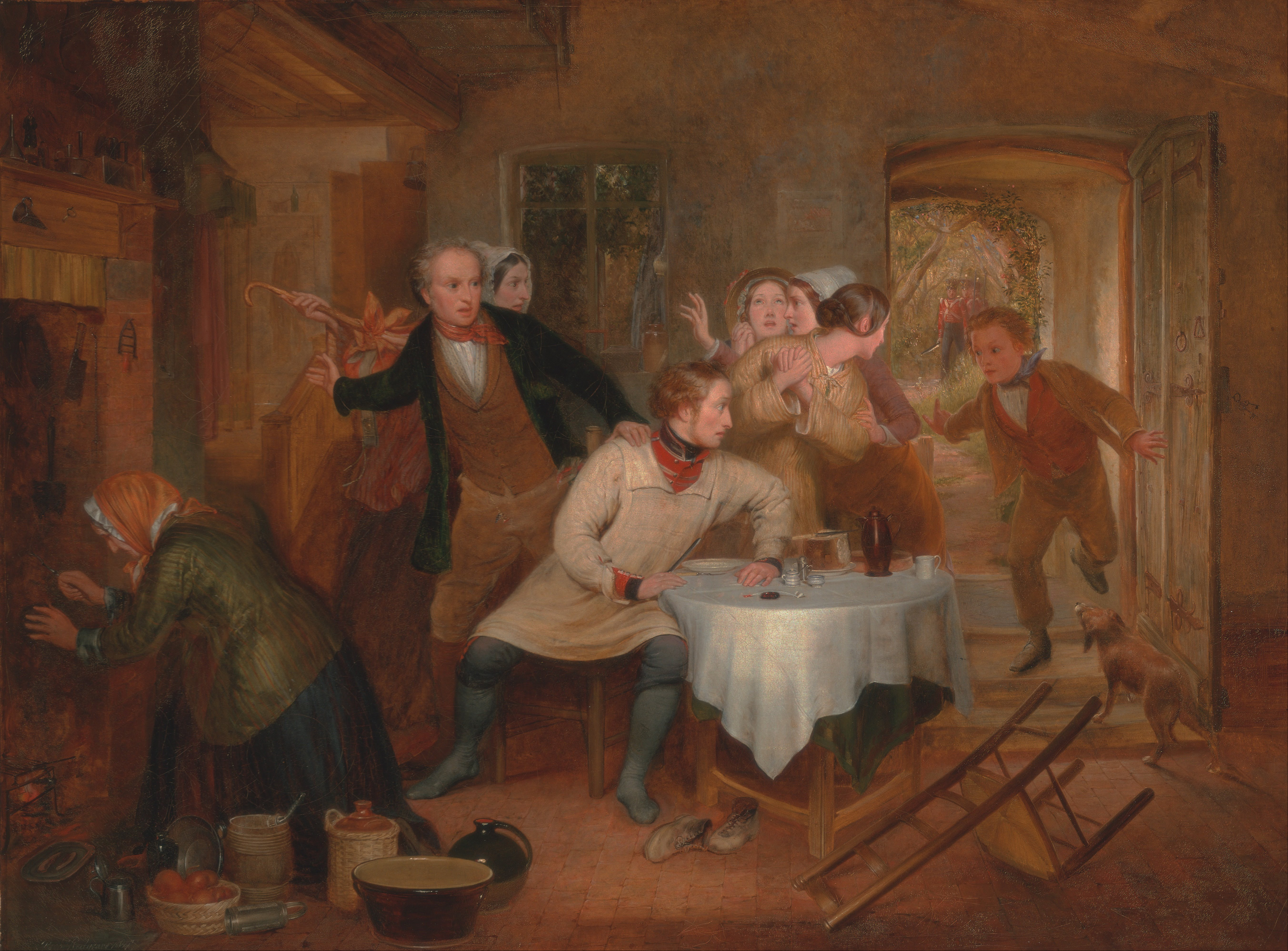
The Deserter's Home by Richard Redgrave

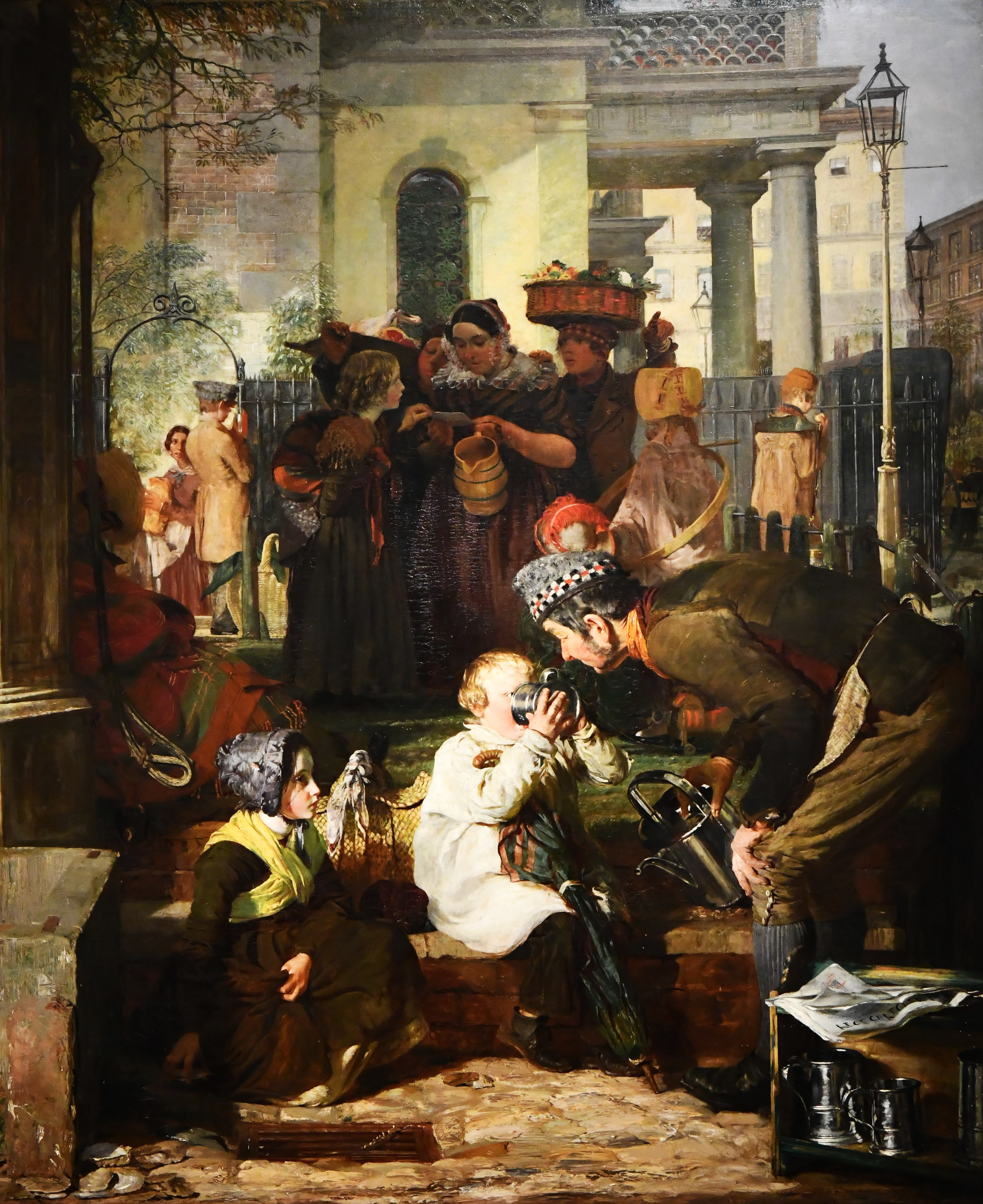
Refreshing the Weary by Robert Hannah

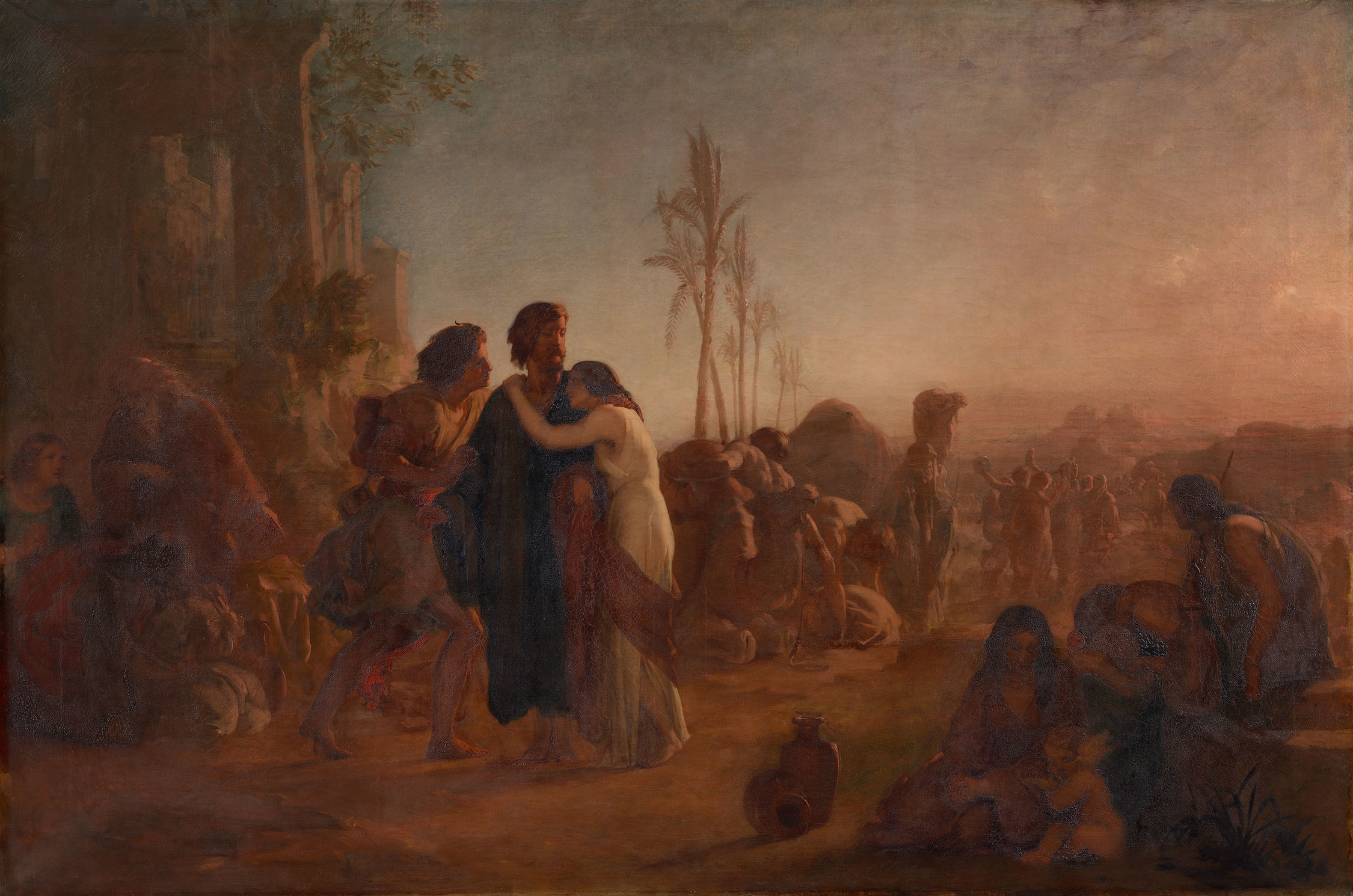
The Liberation of Slaves by Henry Le Jeune

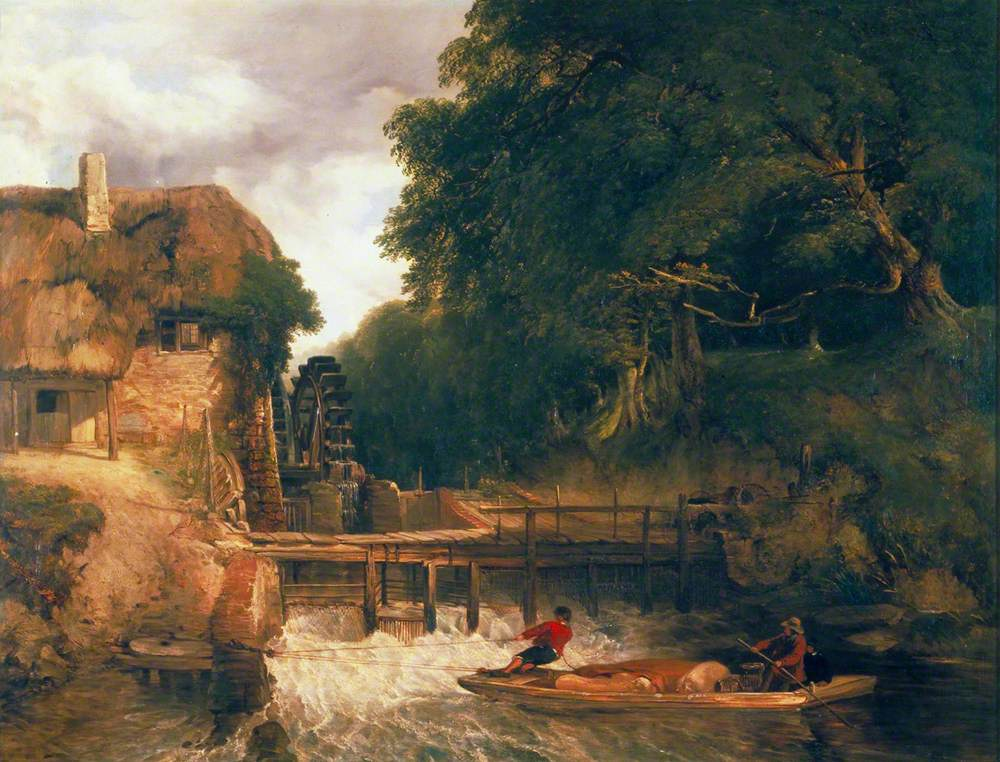
The Miller's Boat by Frederick Richard Lee

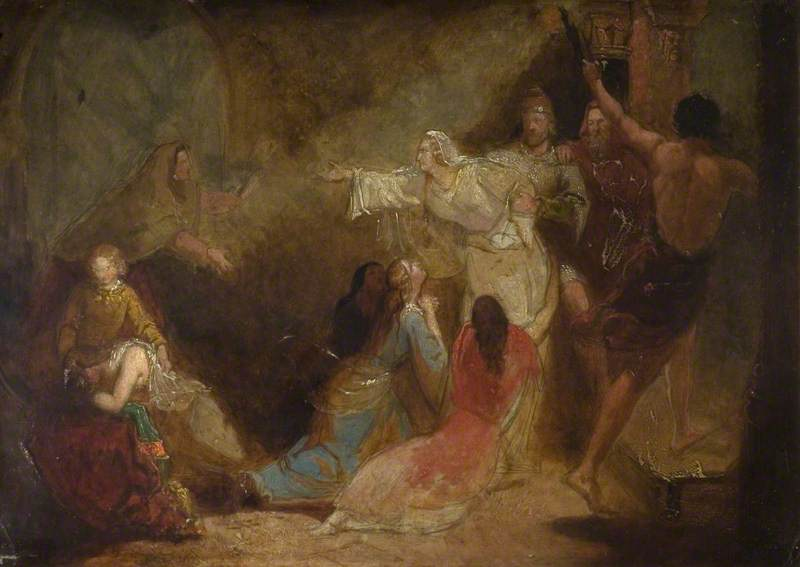
Elgiva Seized by Order of Archbishop Odo by John Everett Millais

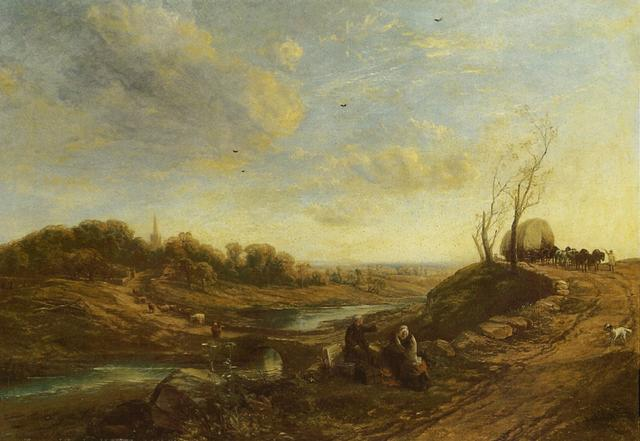
The London Road a Hundred Years Ago by Thomas Creswick

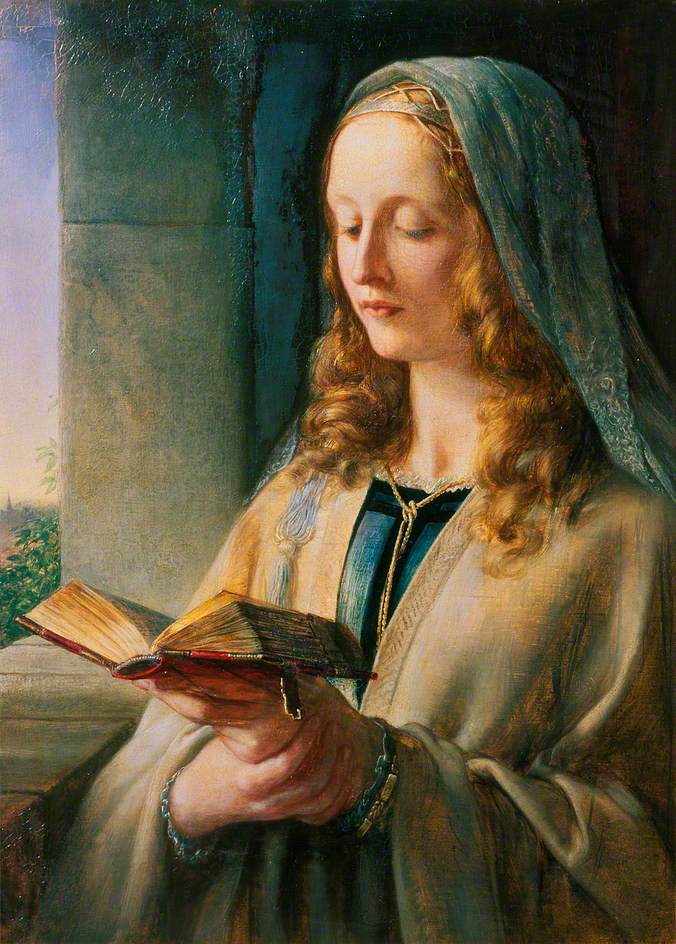
Maiden Meditation by Charles West Cope

The Guardian Angel by Richard Redgrave

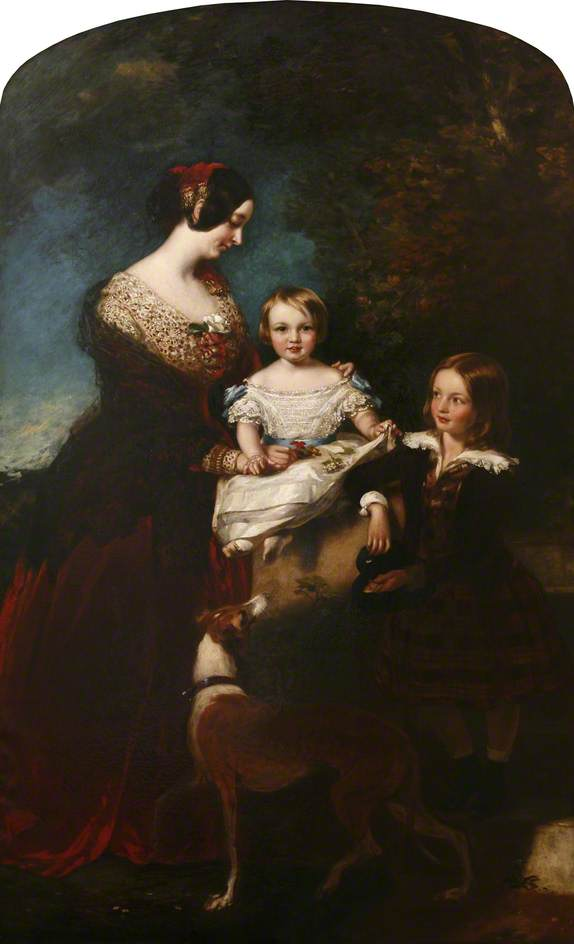
Countess of Mount Edgcumbe with Her Two Youngest Children by James Sant

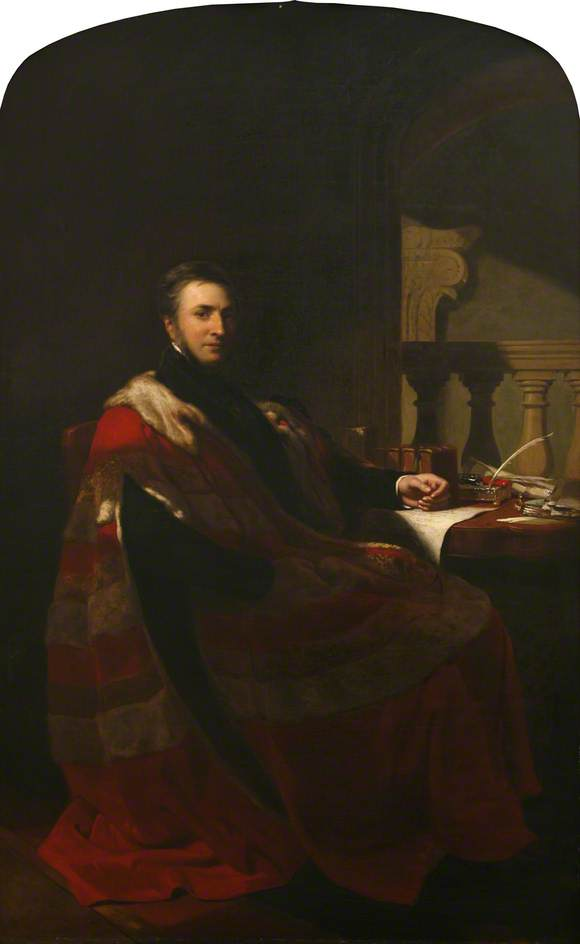
Portrait of Earl of Mount Edgcumbe by James Sant

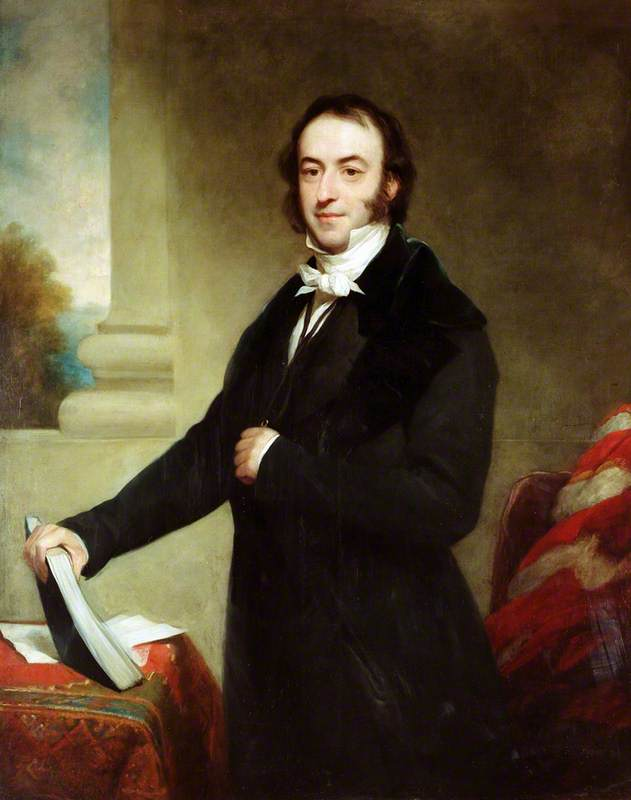
Portrait of Marquess of Northampton by Thomas Phillips and Henry Wyndham Phillips

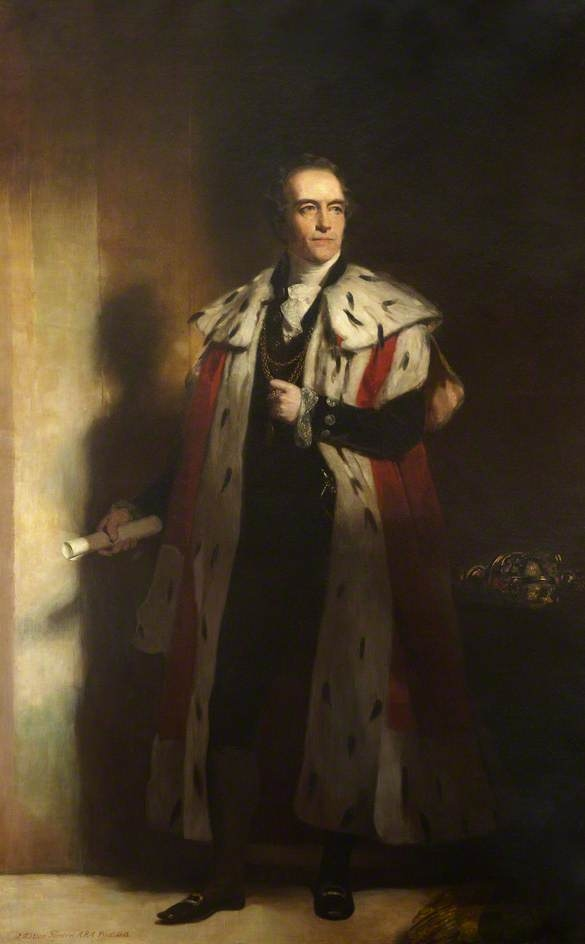
Portrait of Adam Black by John Watson Gordon

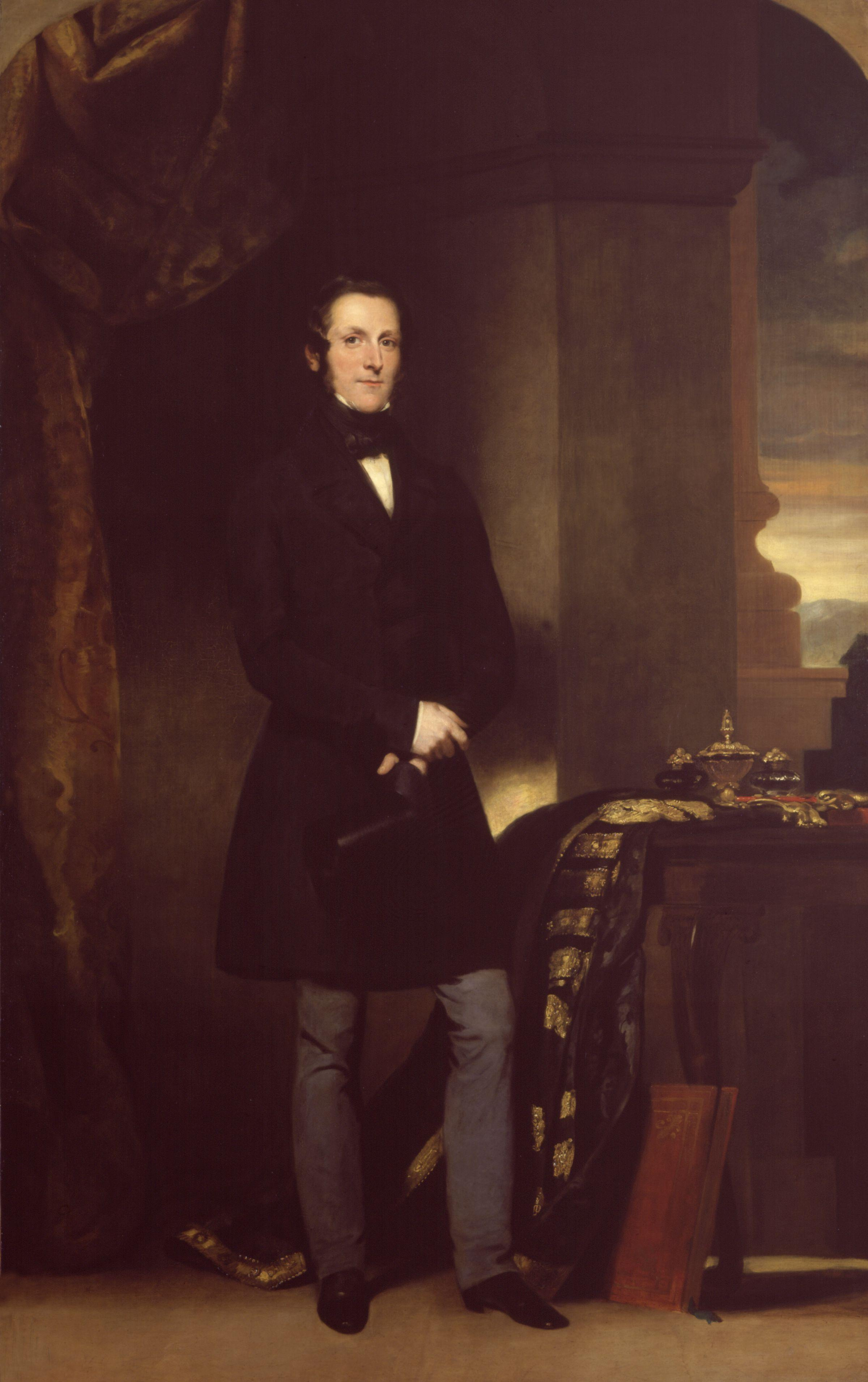
Portrait of Earl of Dalhousie by John Watson Gordon

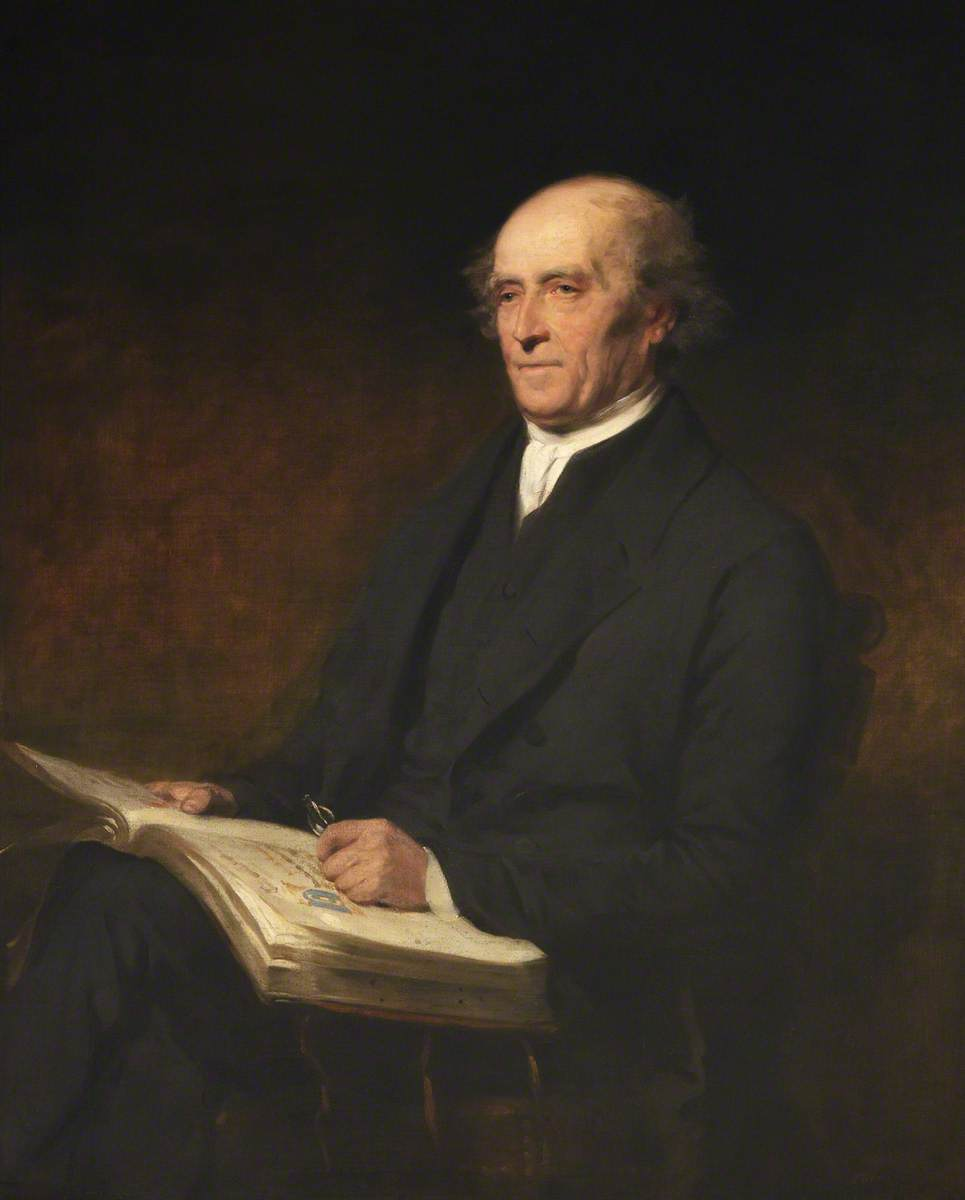
Portrait of John Lee by John Watson Gordon

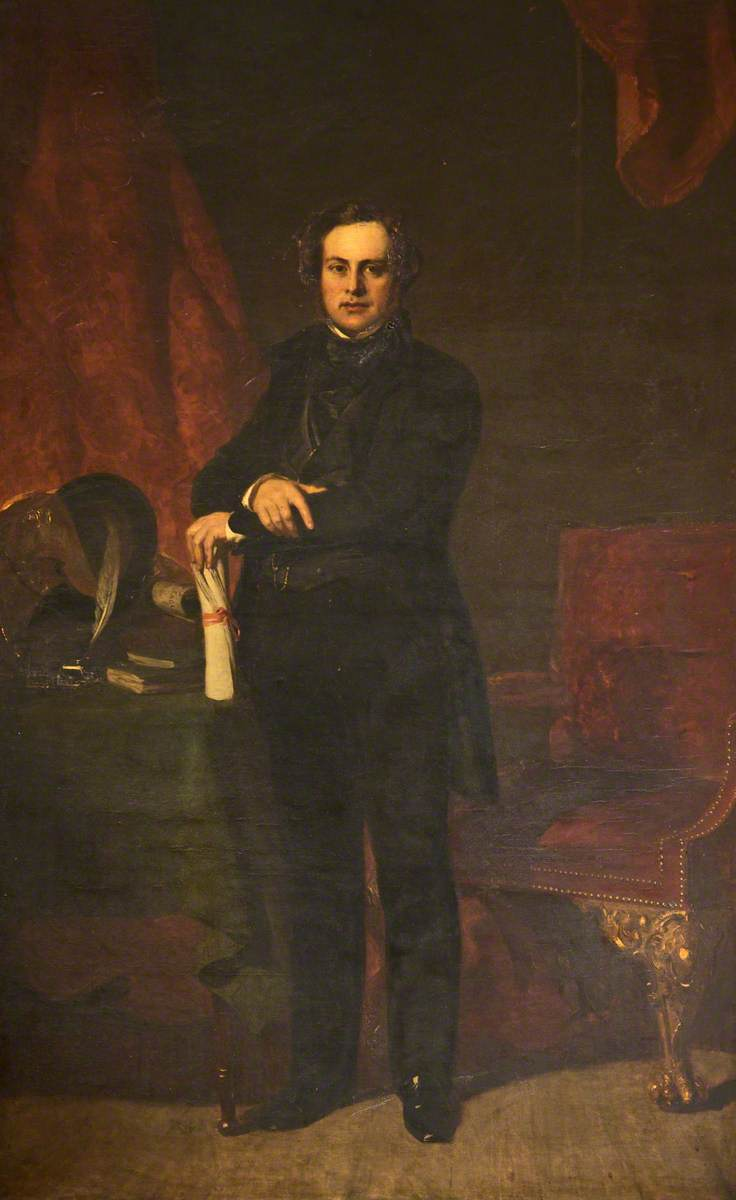
Portrait of John Bright by John Prescott Knight

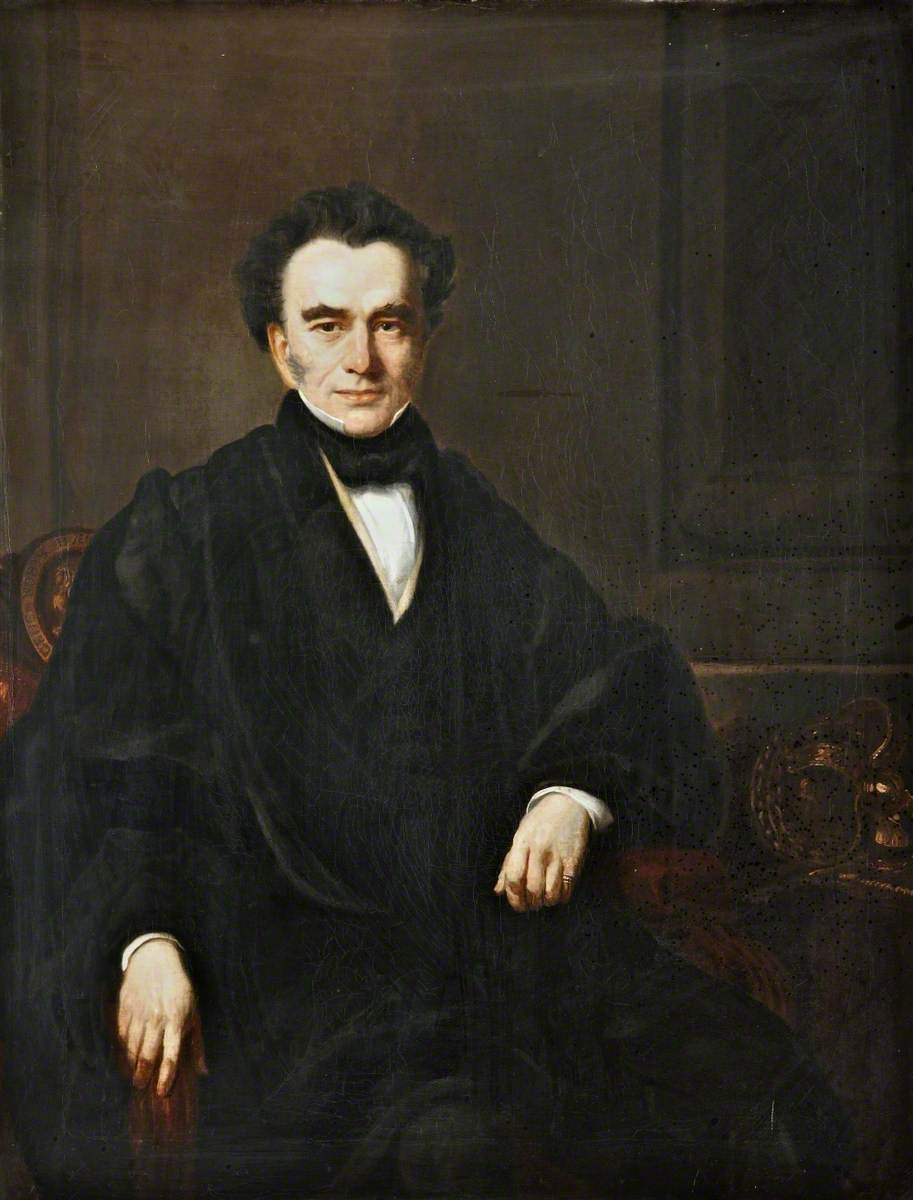
Portrait of Thomas Sands by George Patten

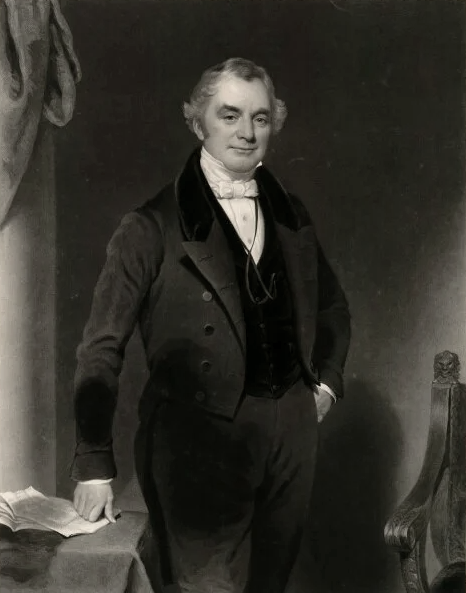
Portrait of Joseph Baxendale, print based on the painting by Henry William Pickersgill

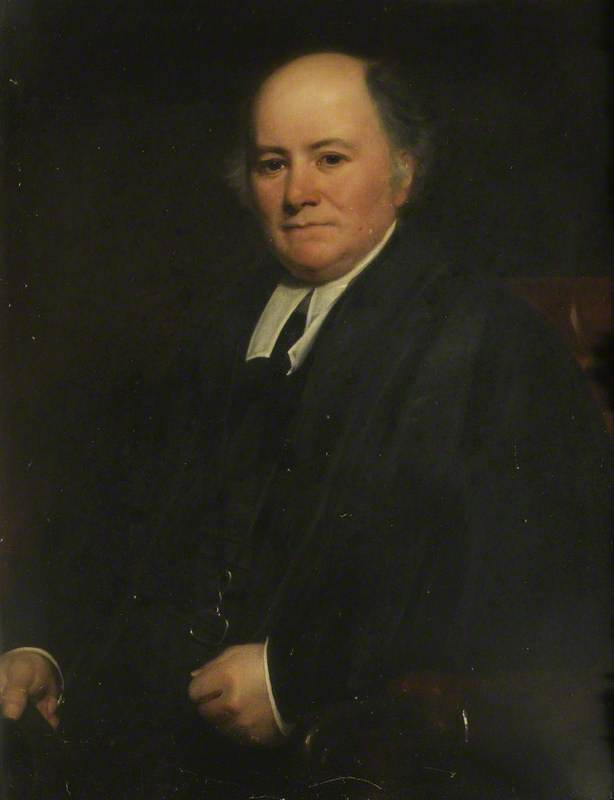
Portrait of Thomas Gaisford by Henry William Pickersgill

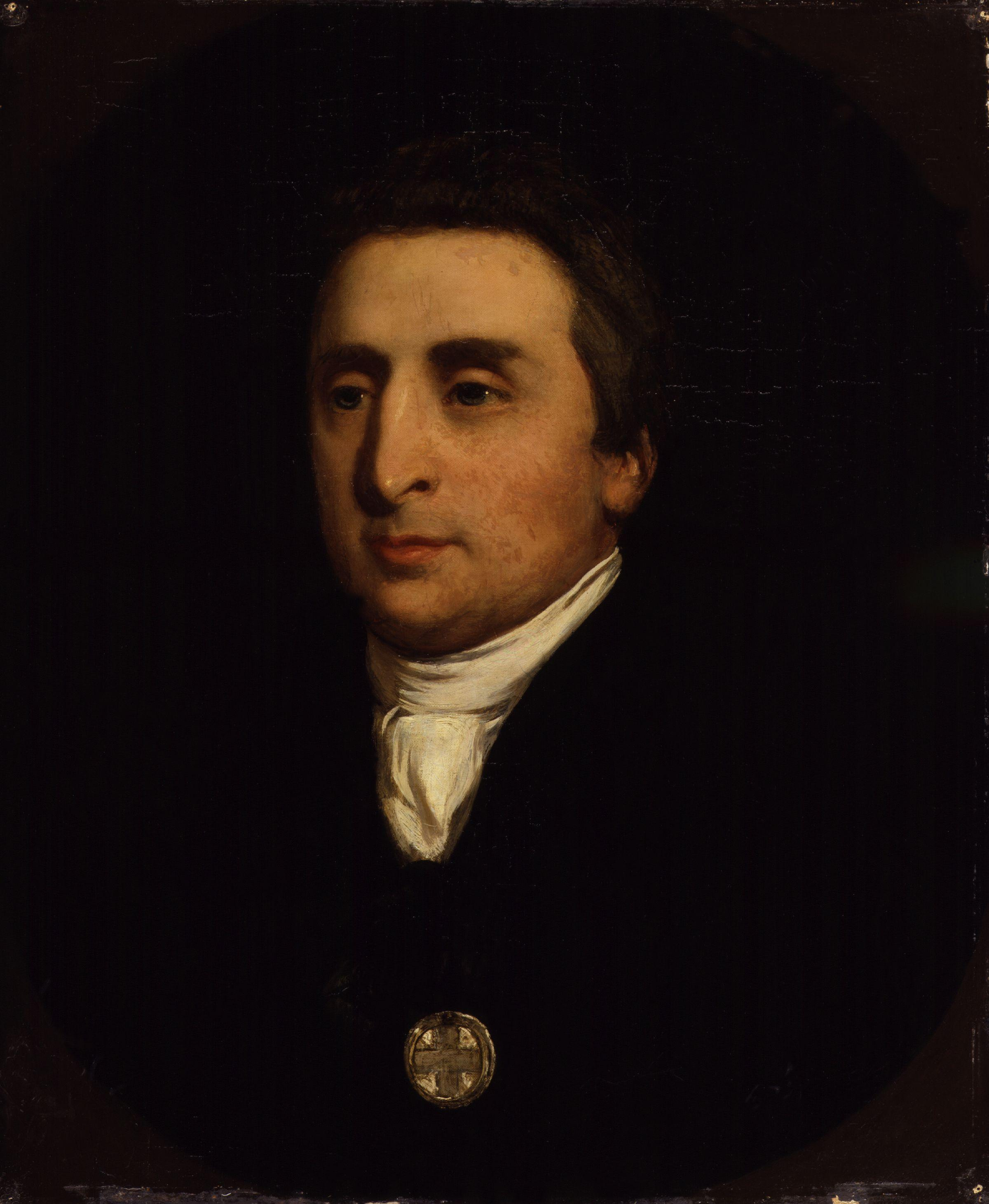
Portrait of Theobald Mathew by Edward Daniel Leahy

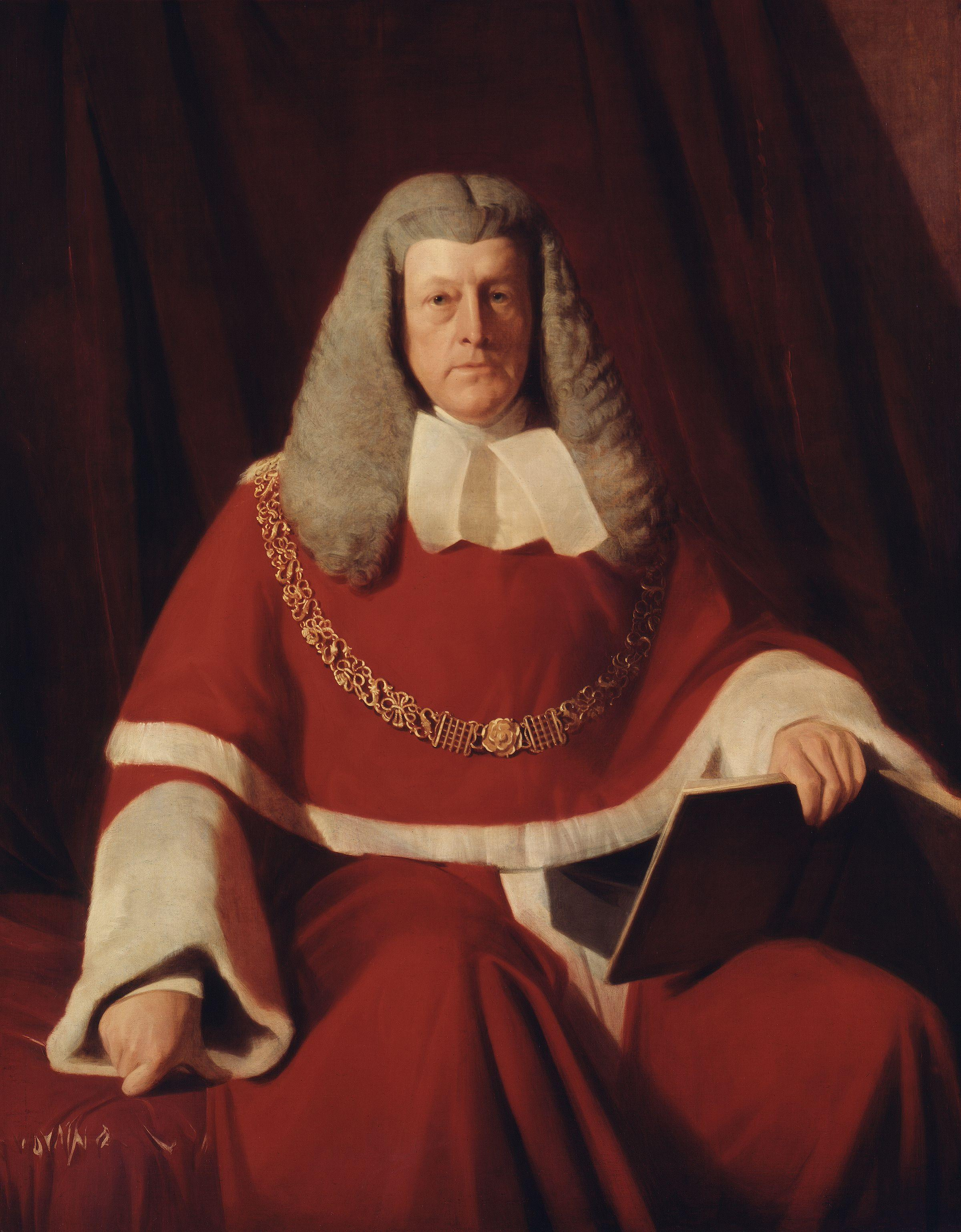
Portrait of Frederick Pollock by Samuel Laurence

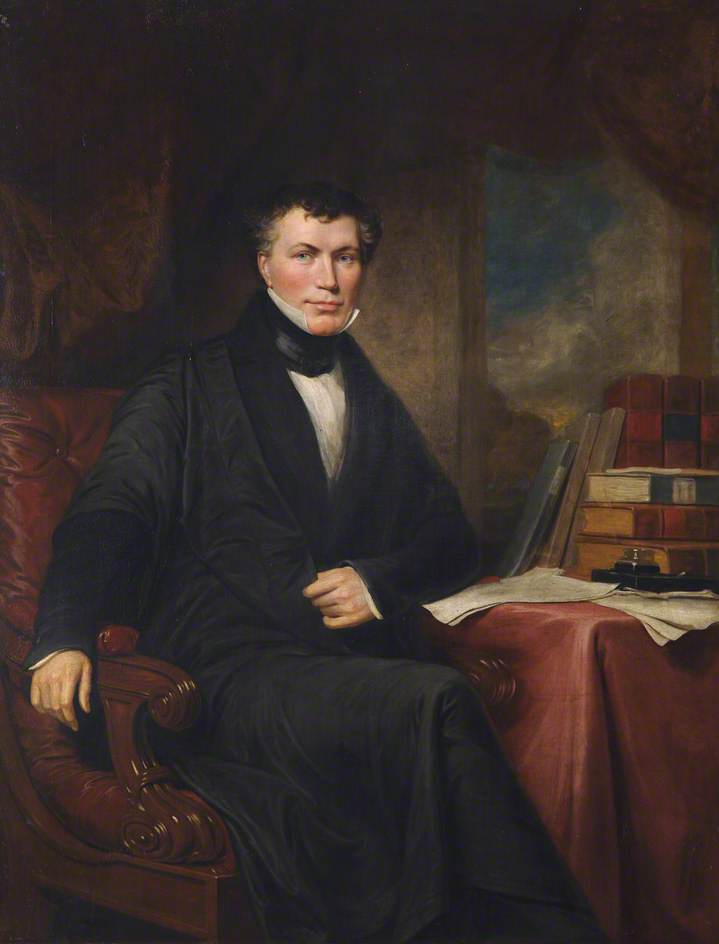
Portrait of William Whewell by Samuel Laurence

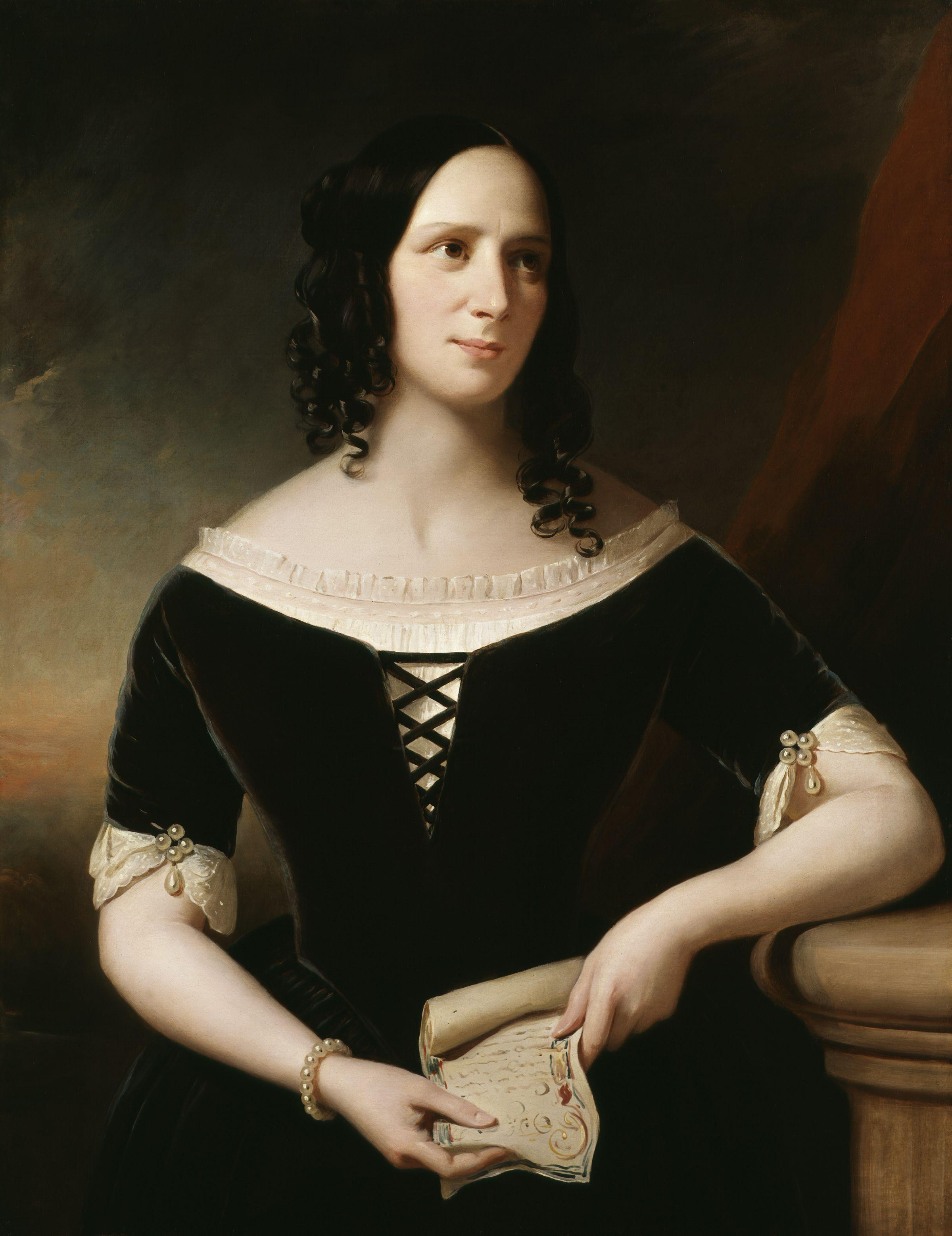
Portrait of Agnes Strickland by John Hayes

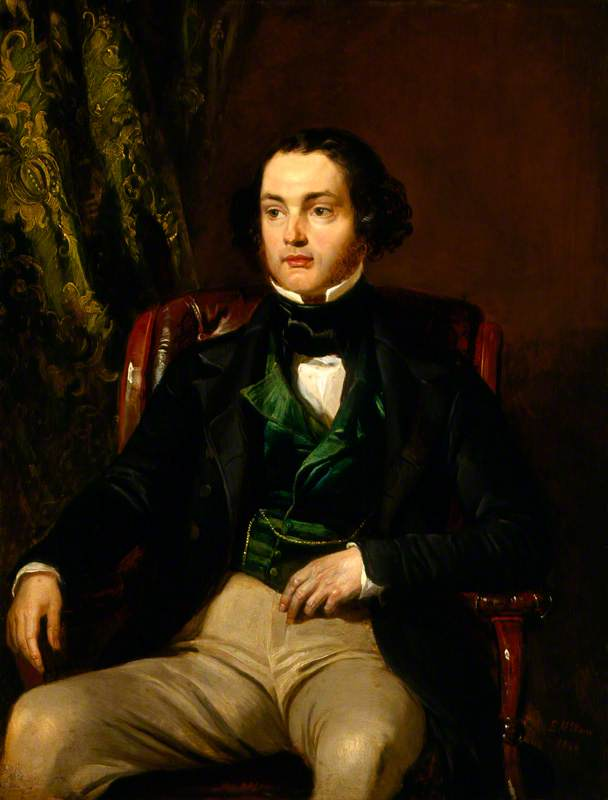
Portrait of Daniel Maclise by Edward Matthew Ward

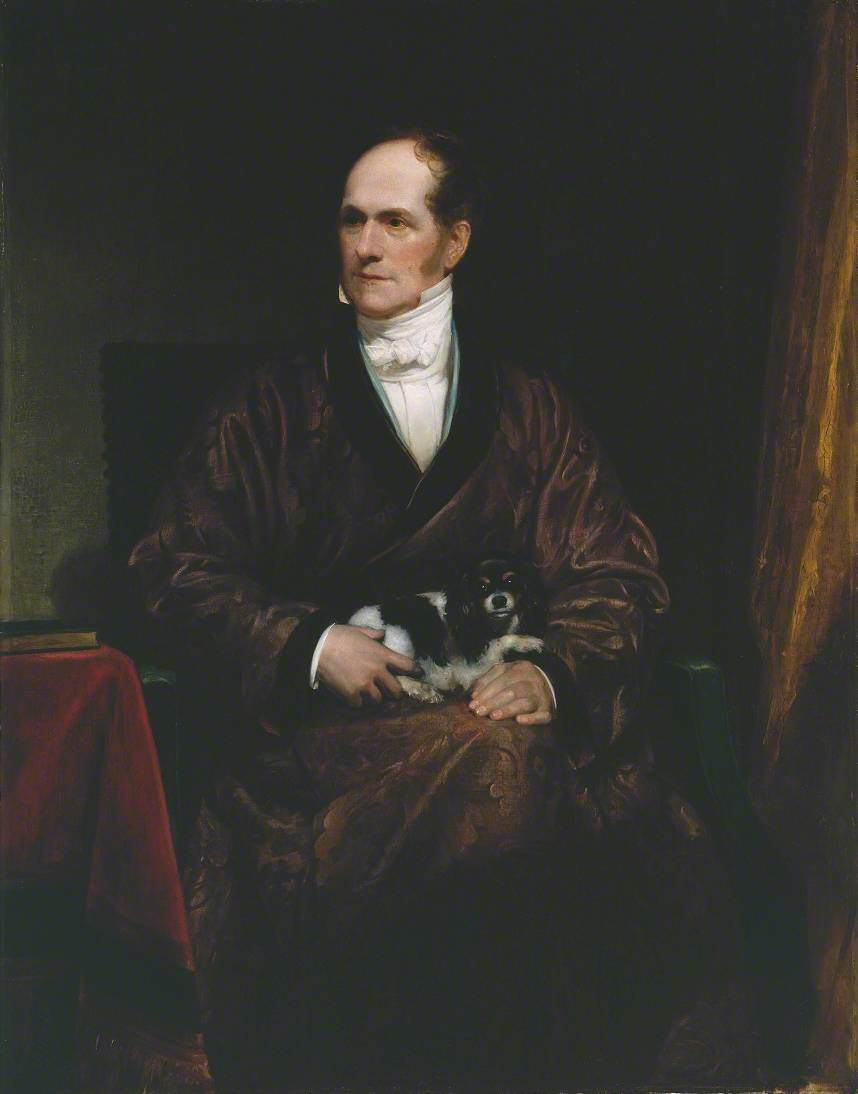
Portrait of Robert Vernon by Henry William Pickersgill

Portrait of Henry Dover by Francis Grant

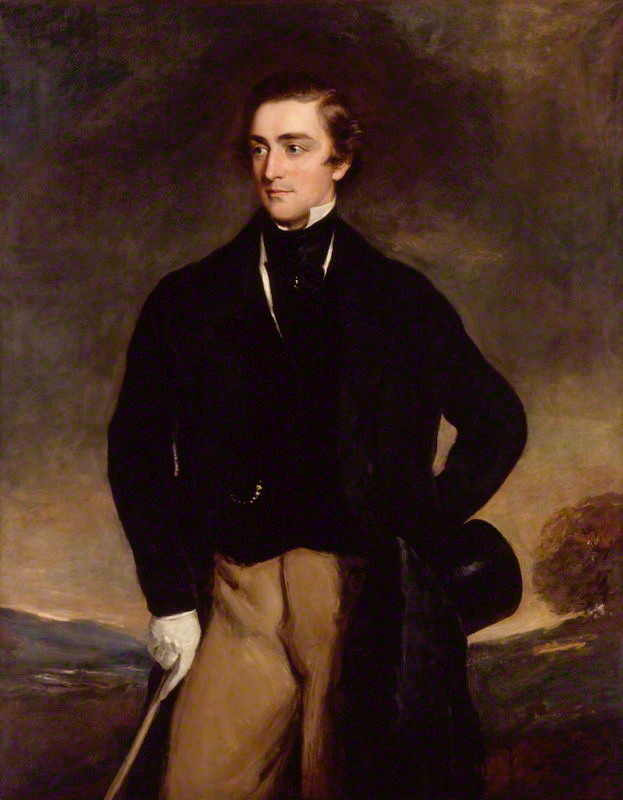
Portrait of Sidney Herbert by Francis Grant

== See also ==
- Salon of 1847, a contemporary art exhibition held in Paris

== Bibliography ==
- Bailey, Anthony. J.M.W. Turner: Standing in the Sun. Tate Enterprises Ltd, 2013.
- Donald, Diana. Picturing Animals in Britain, 1750–1850. Yale University Press, 2007.
- Fish, Arthur. John Everett Millais, 1829-1896. Funk & Wagnalls, 1923.
- Hamilton, James. Turner - A Life. Sceptre, 1998.
- Maas, Jeremy. Holman Hunt and the Light of the World. Scolar Press, 1984.
- Marsden, Jonathan. Victoria & Albert: Art & Love. Royal Collection, 2010.
- Wills, Catherine. High Society: The Life and Art of Sir Francis Grant, 1803–1878. National Galleries of Scotland, 2003.
