= The Deer Drive =

Painting by Edwin Landseer

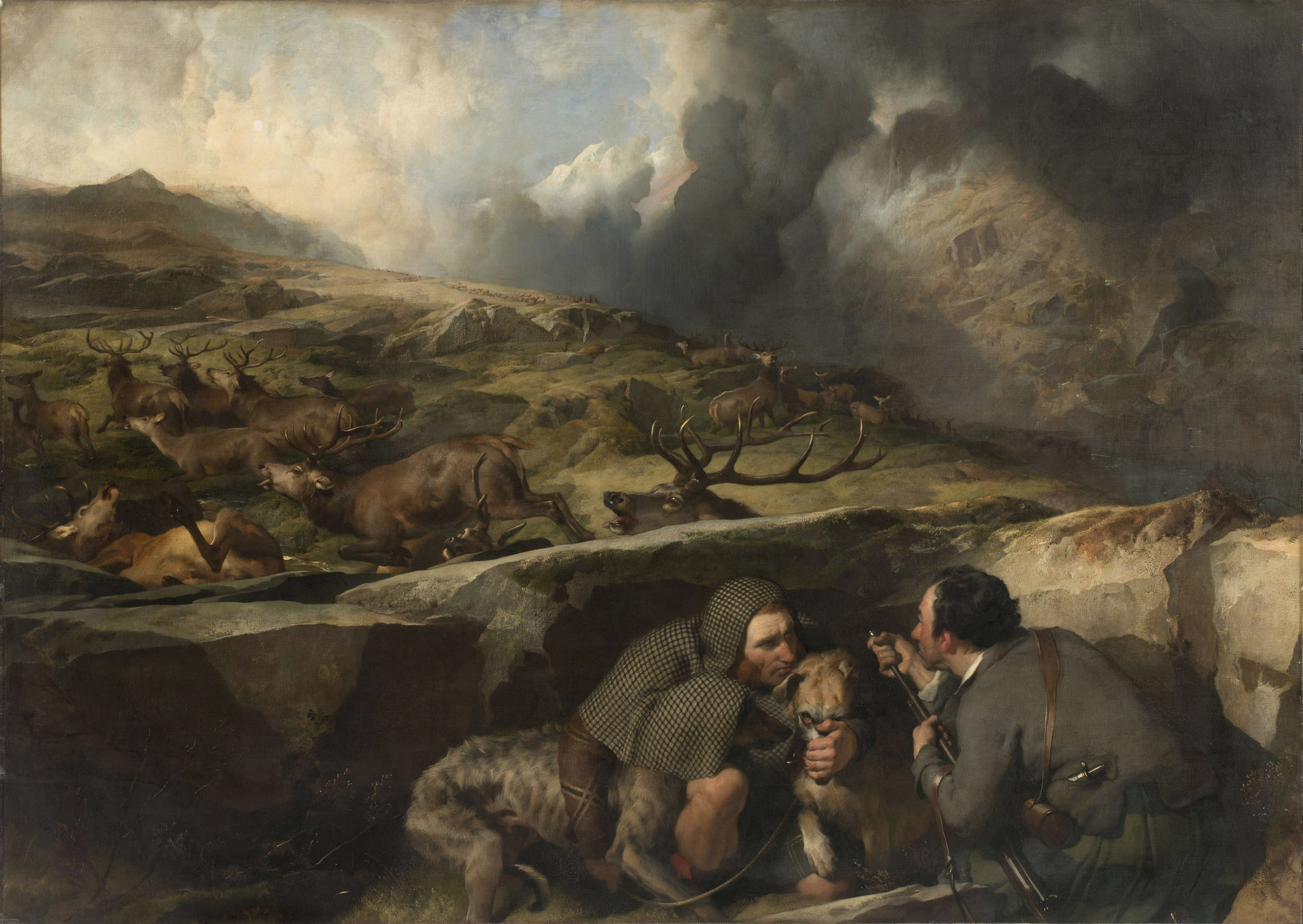
- Artist: Edwin Landseer
- Year: 1847
- Type: Oil on canvas, genre painting
- Dimensions: 243.8 cm × 353.1 cm (96.0 in × 139.0 in)
- Location: Royal Collection

The Deer Drive is an 1847 genre painting by the British artist Edwin Landseer. A hunting scene, it depicts a landscape in the Scottish Highlands. Deer are being driven through a pass where the concealed rifles of the hunters can bring them down. Rather than a celebration, it is likely Landseer regarded this as an unsporting ambush rather than the tradition of deer stalking. The work was displayed at the Royal Academy Exhibition of 1847 at the National Gallery in London. The painting was acquired by Prince Albert and remains in the Royal Collection today.

== Bibliography ==
- Donald, Diana. Picturing Animals in Britain, 1750–1850. Yale University Press, 2007.
- Marsden, Jonathan. Victoria & Albert: Art & Love. Royal Collection, 2010.
- Ormond, Richard. Sir Edwin Landseer. Philadelphia Museum of Art, 1981.
