= Venus Anadyomene (Chassériau) =

Painting by Théodore Chassériau

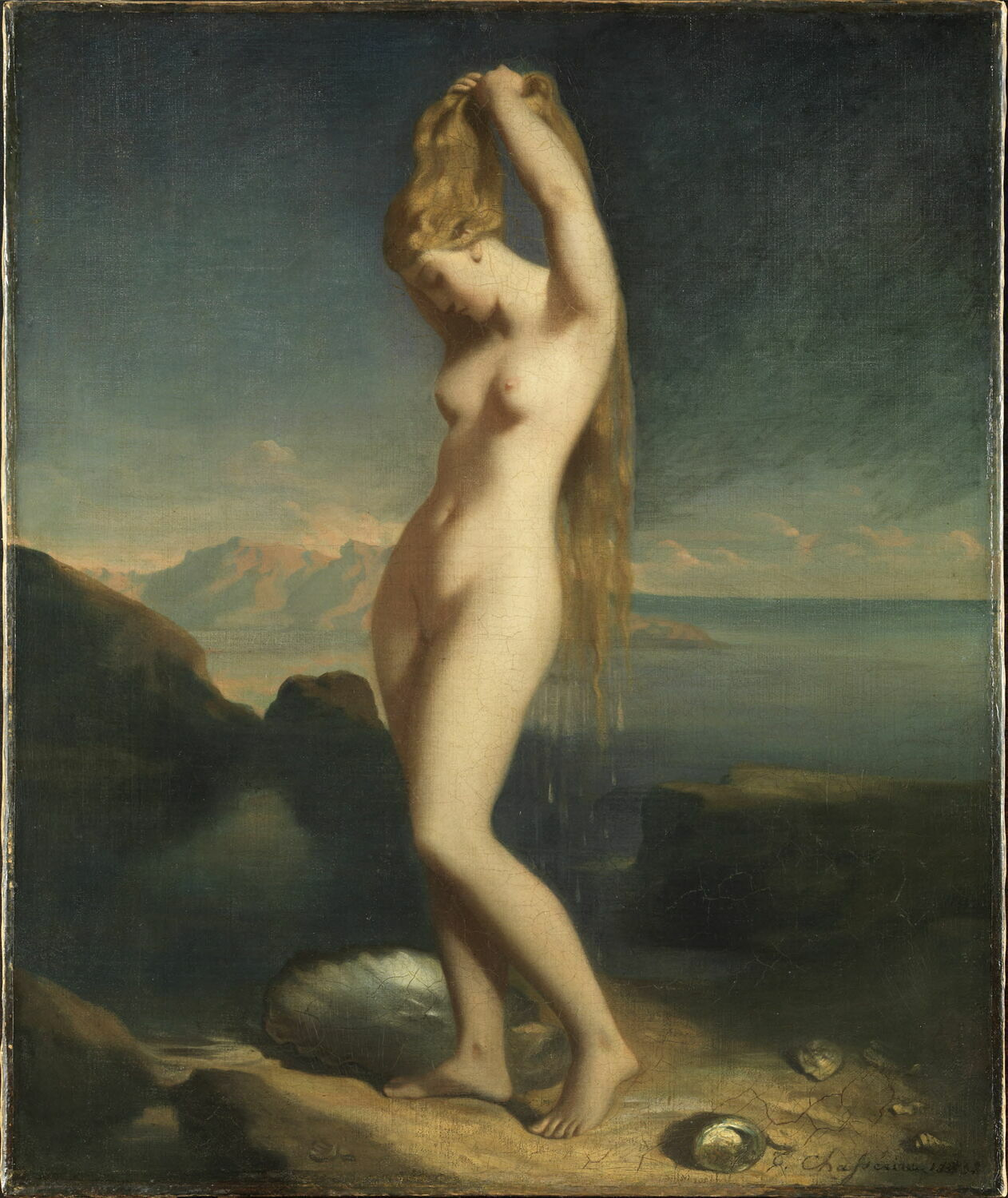
- Artist: Théodore Chassériau
- Year: 1838
- Type: Oil on canvas, history painting
- Dimensions: 65 cm × 55 cm (26 in × 22 in)
- Location: Louvre; Paris

Venus Anadyomene is an oil painting by the French artist Théodore Chassériau, from 1828. It depicts the classical scene of Venus Anadyomene, showing the Goddess Venus rising from the sea. It appeared at the Salon of 1839, where it was a popular success and along with Susanna at her Bath established the young artist's reputation. Today the painting is in the Louvre in Paris, having been acquired in 1920.

A smaller version of the composition, more freely executed and somewhat more realistic, is in a private collection. It is not known whether it is a study for the larger painting or an autograph replica.

== Bibliography ==
- Guégan, Stéphane; Pomarède, Vincent; Prat, Louis-Antoine (2002). Théodore Chassériau, 1819–1856: The Unknown Romantic. New Haven and London: Yale University Press. ISBN 1-58839-067-5.
- Murray, Christopher John. Encyclopedia of the Romantic Era, 1760–1850, Volume 2. Taylor & Francis, 2004.
- Muesham, Gerd. French Painters and Paintings from the Fourteenth Century to Post-impressionism. Ungar, 1970.
