= Salon of 1839 =

1839 art exhibition in Paris

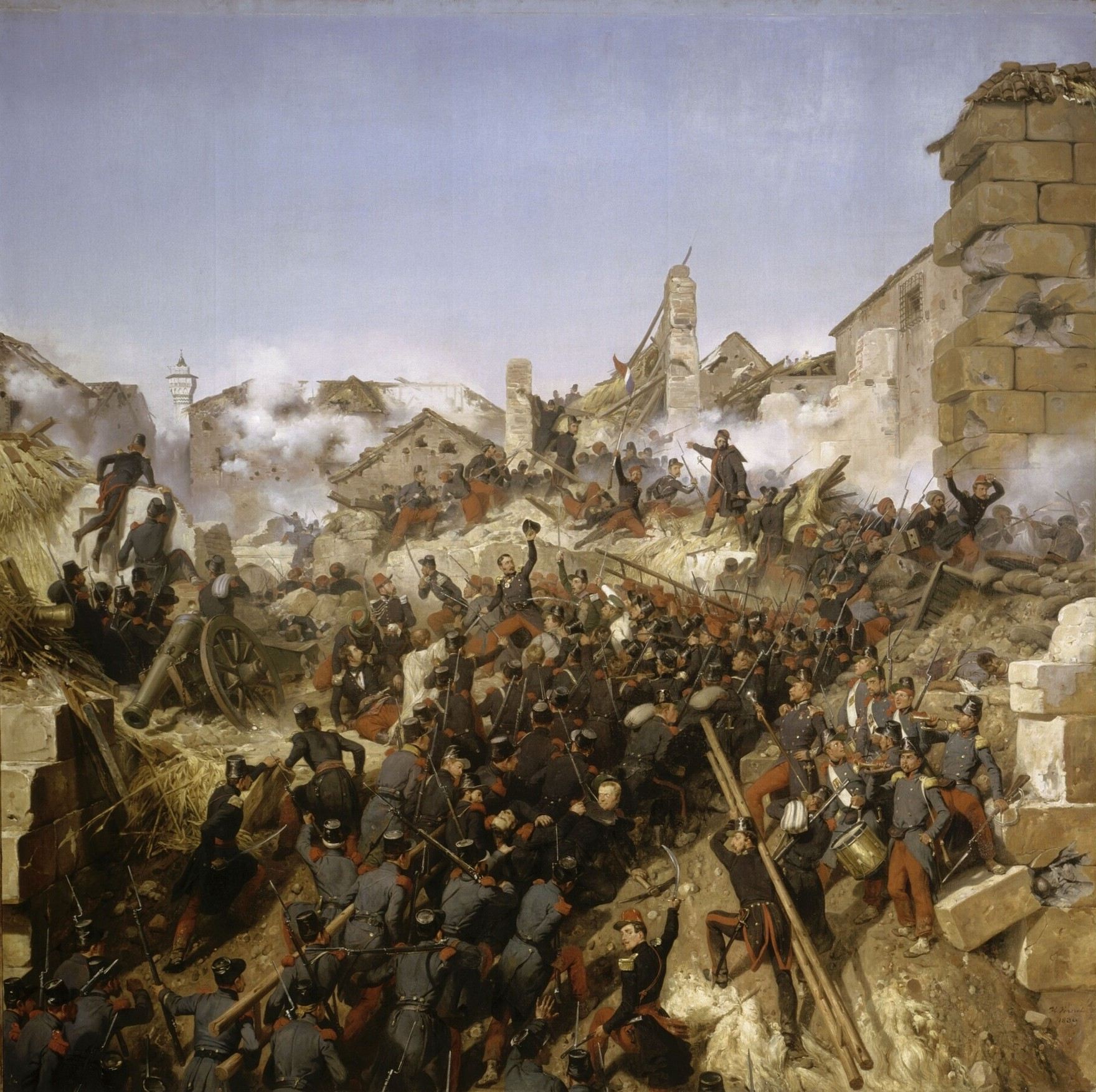
The Siege of Constantine by Horace Vernet

The Salon of 1839 was an art exhibition held at the Louvre in Paris between 1 March and 30 April 1839 and featured submissions of paintings and sculpture. Since 1833 the Salon had switched to being held annually, organised by the Academy of Fine Arts. As was common during the July Monarchy it featured a number of works commissioned by Louis Philippe I for the Museum of French History at the Palace of Versailles. As well as the usual depictions of historic French victories, the Salon displayed several paintings depiction the ongoing French conquest of Algeria, notably Horace Vernet's The Siege of Constantine.

Romanticism remained the stylistically dominant force. Eugène Delacroix displayed Cleopatra and the Peasant, possibly inspired by William Shakespeare's tragedy Anthony and Cleopatra. It marked the breakthrough for the young Théodore Chassériau whose Susanna at Her Bath and Venus Anadyomene was widely acclaimed.

It should not be confused with the Salon de Bruxelles held later the same year in Belgium. The exhibition was followed by the Salon of 1840.

== Gallery ==
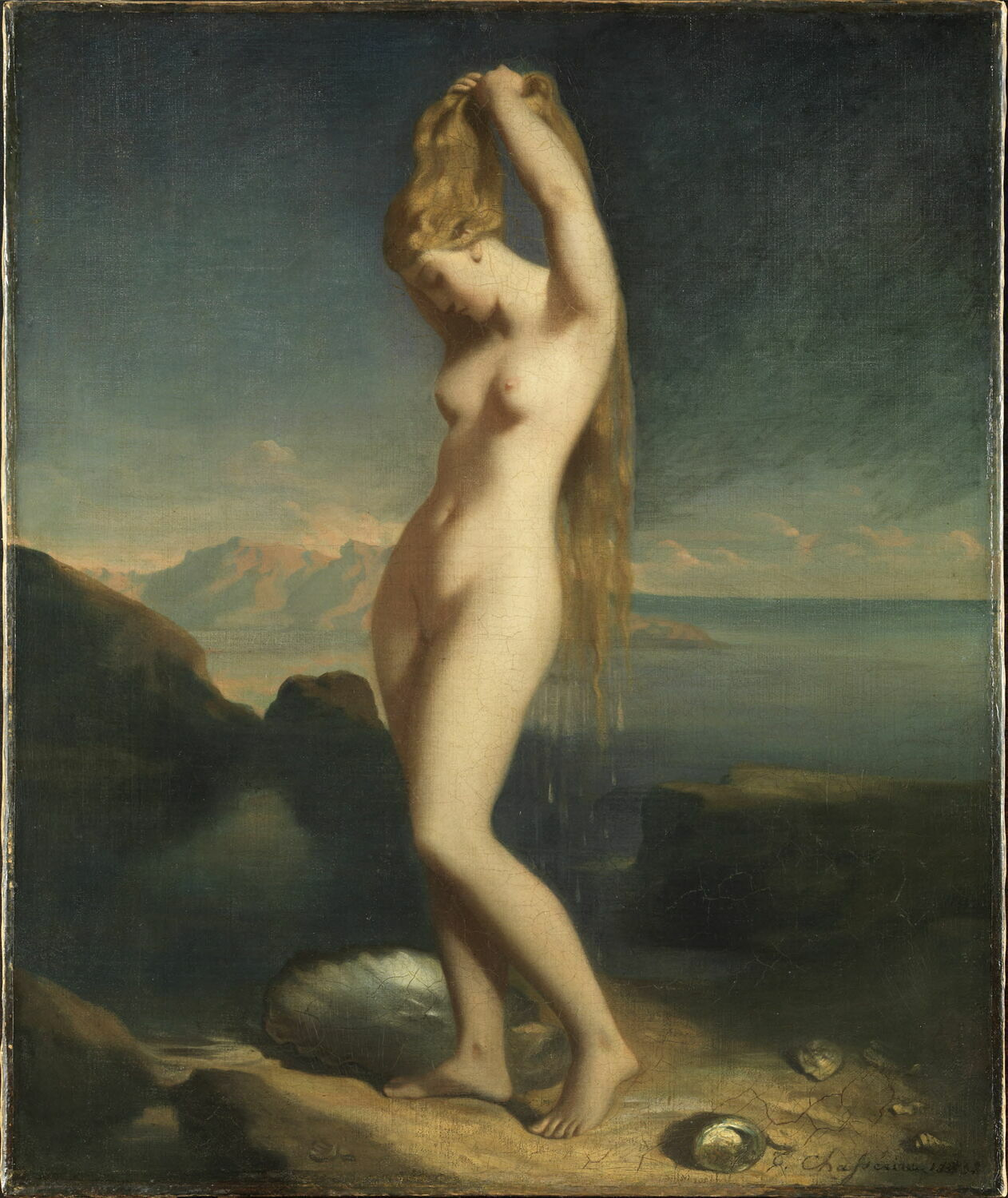
Venus Anadyomene by Théodore Chassériau

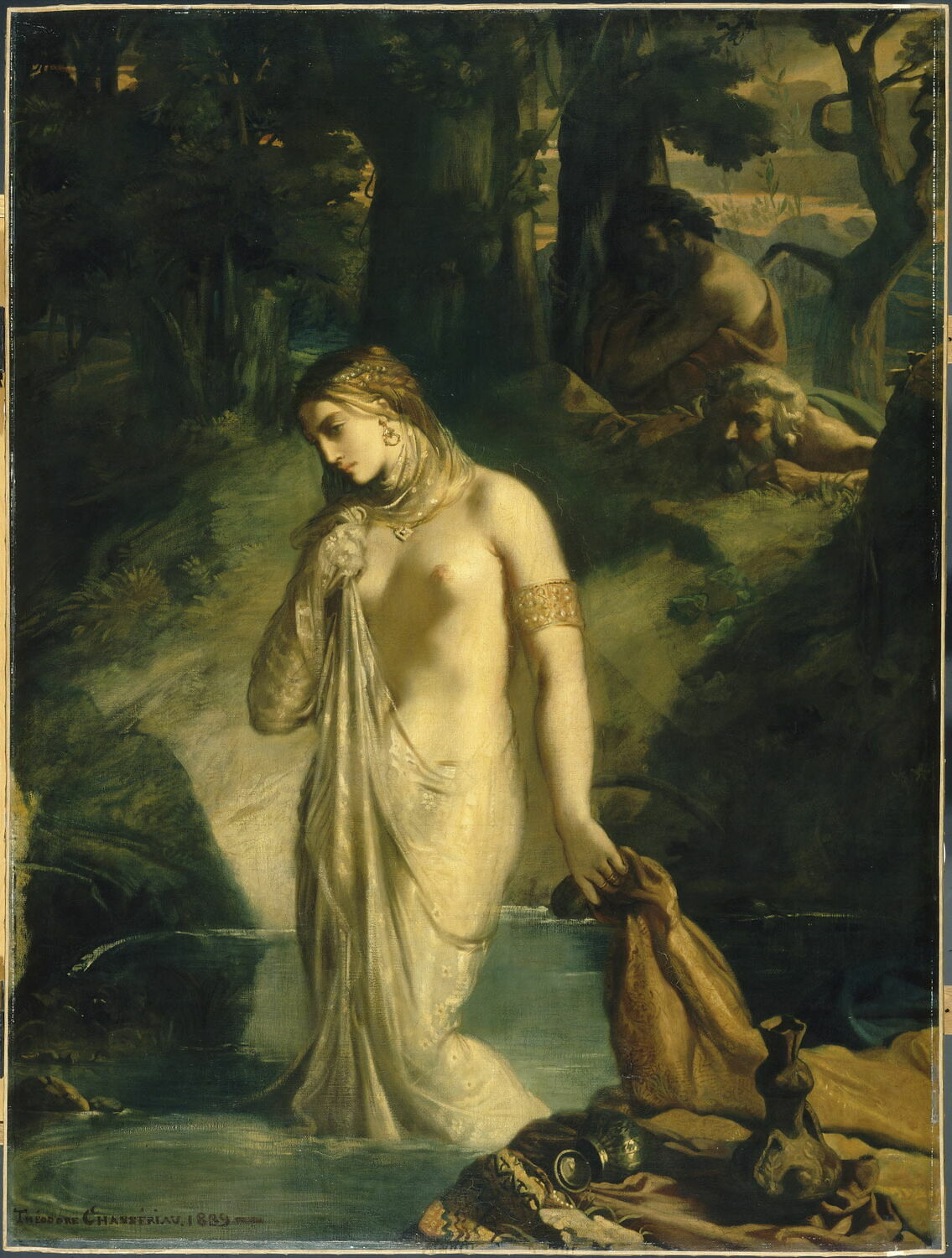
Susanna at Her Bath by Théodore Chassériau

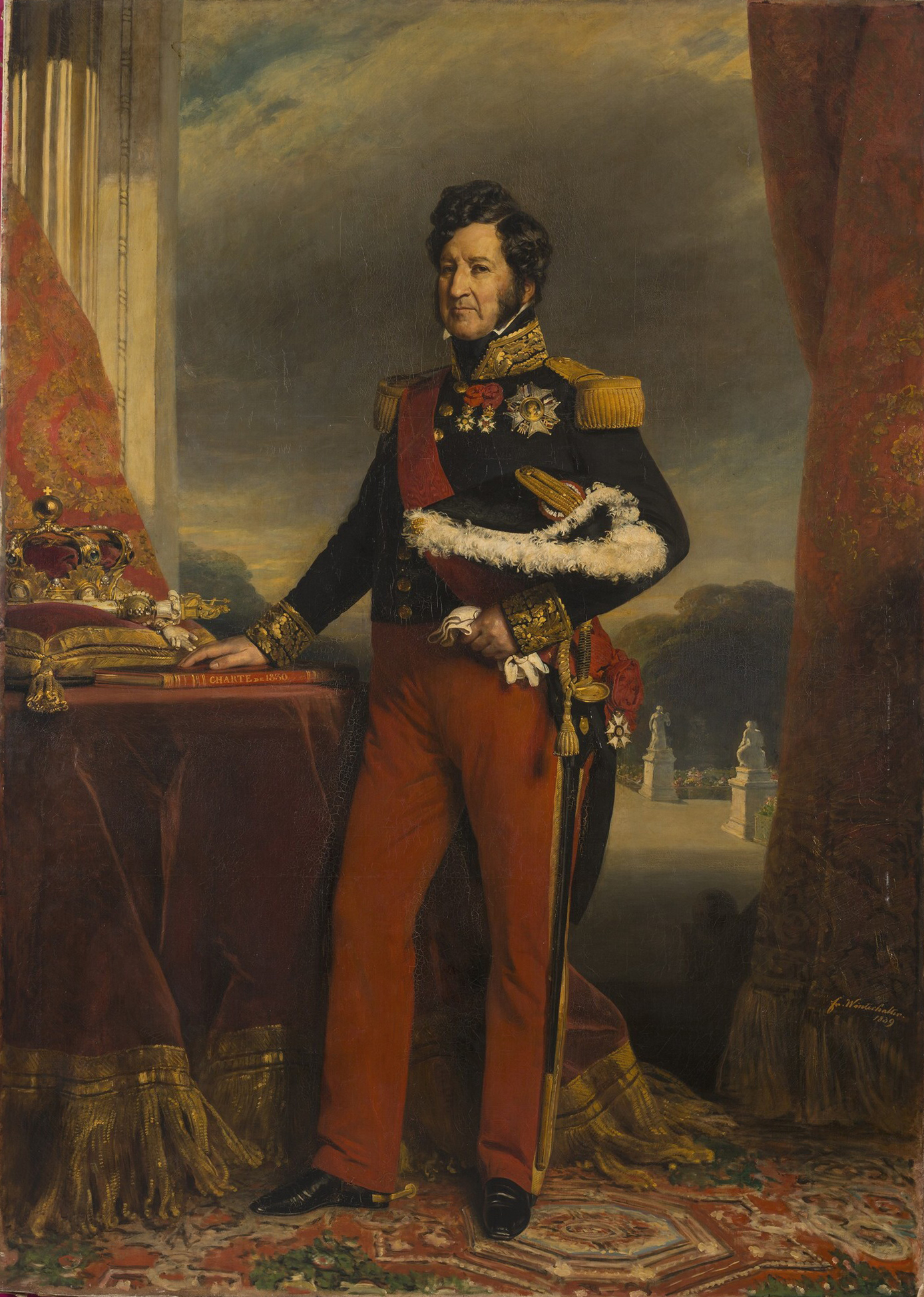
Portrait of Louis Philippe I by Franz Xaver Winterhalter

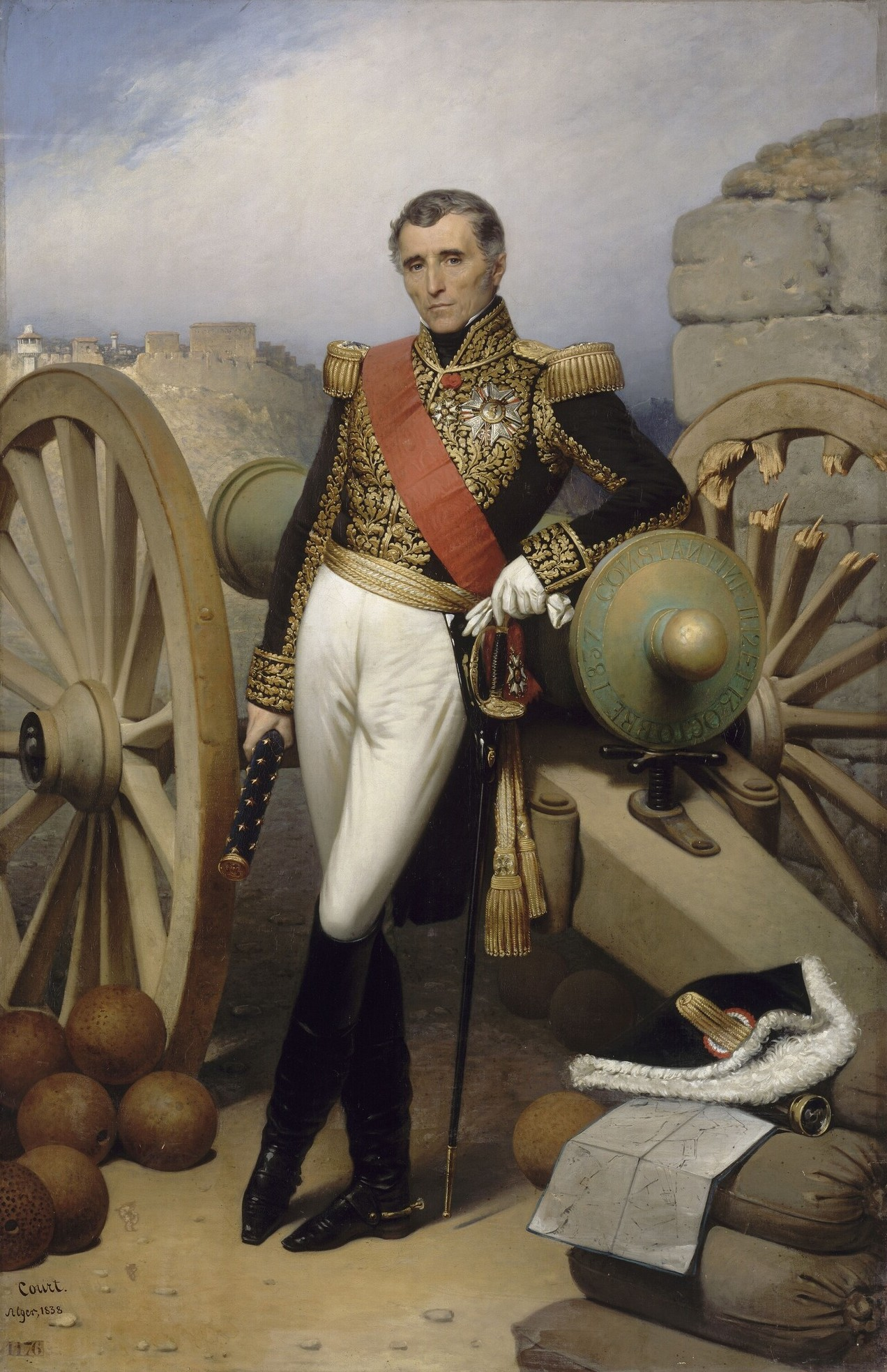
Portrait of Sylvain Charles Valée by Joseph-Désiré Court

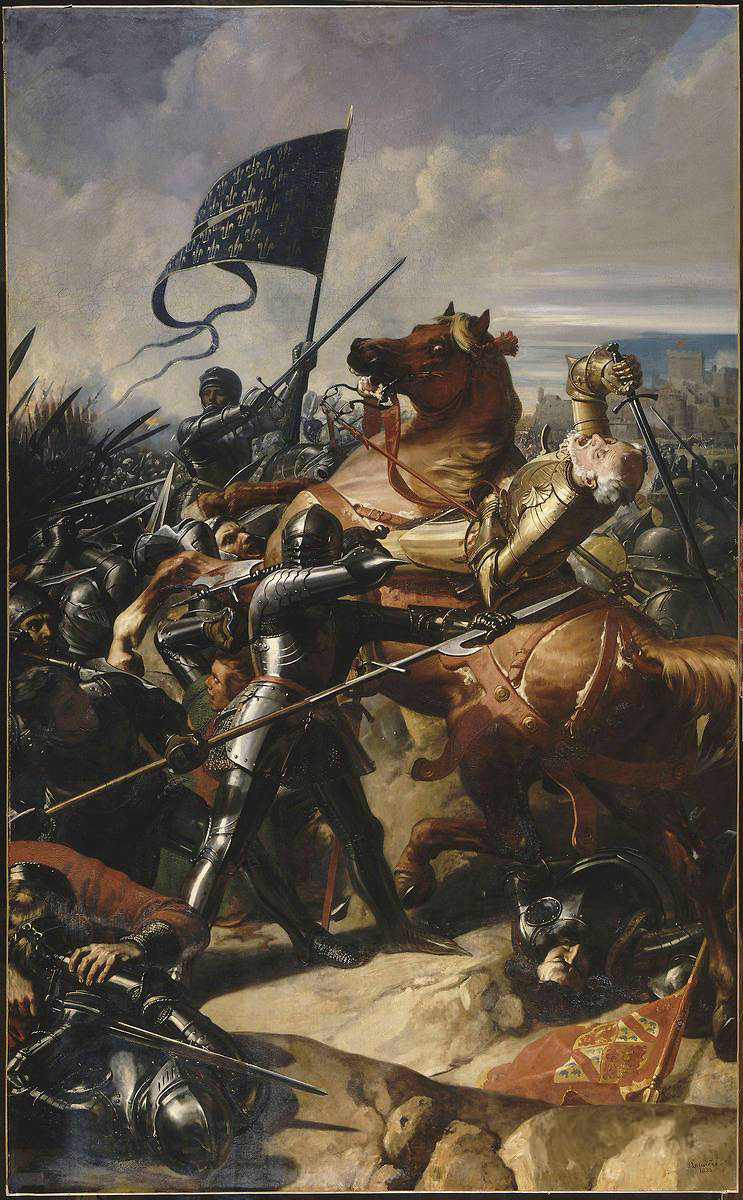
The Battle of Castillon by Charles-Philippe Larivière

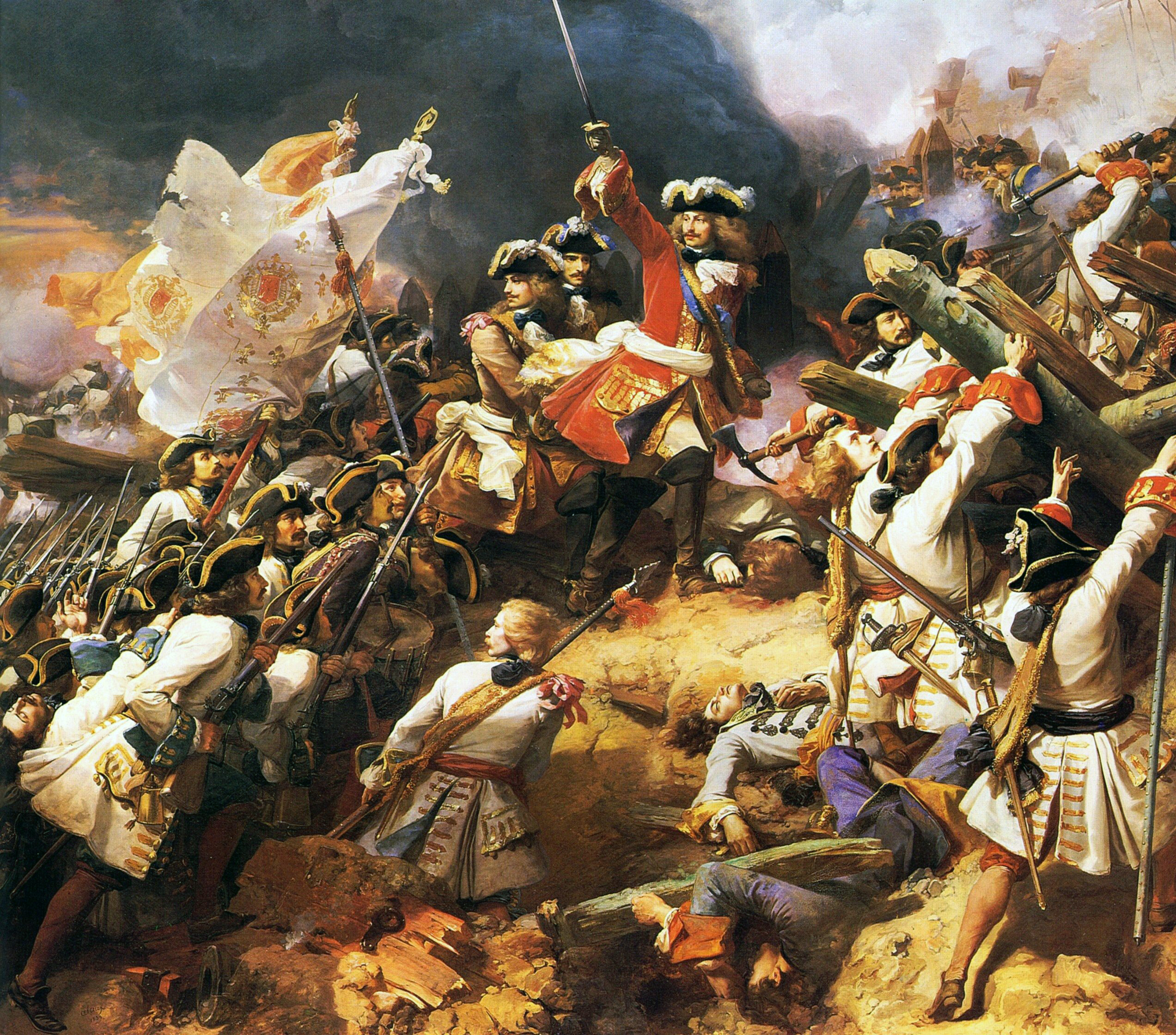
The Battle of Denain by Jean Alaux

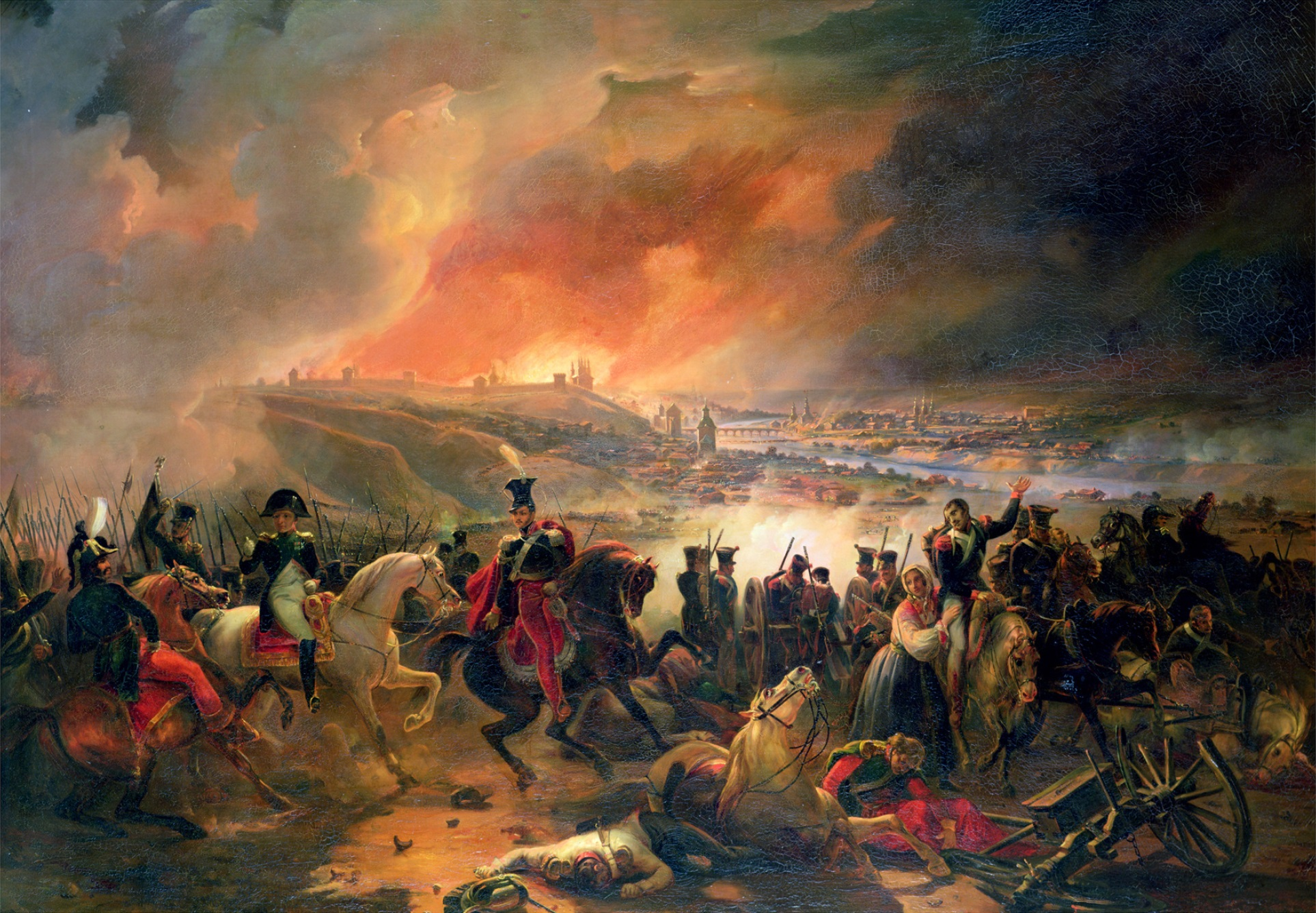
The Battle of Smolensk by Jean-Charles Langlois

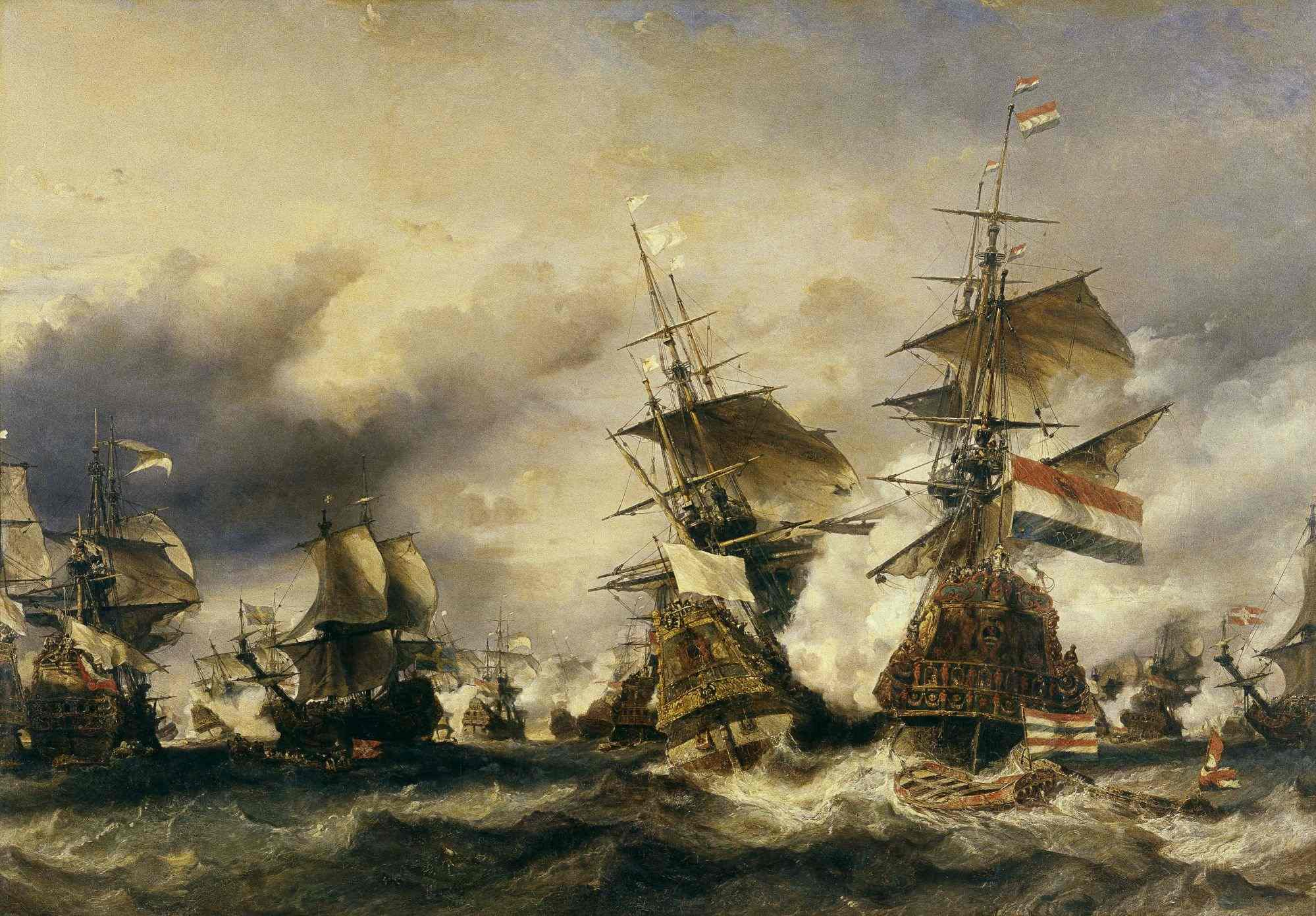
The Battle of Texel by Eugène Isabey

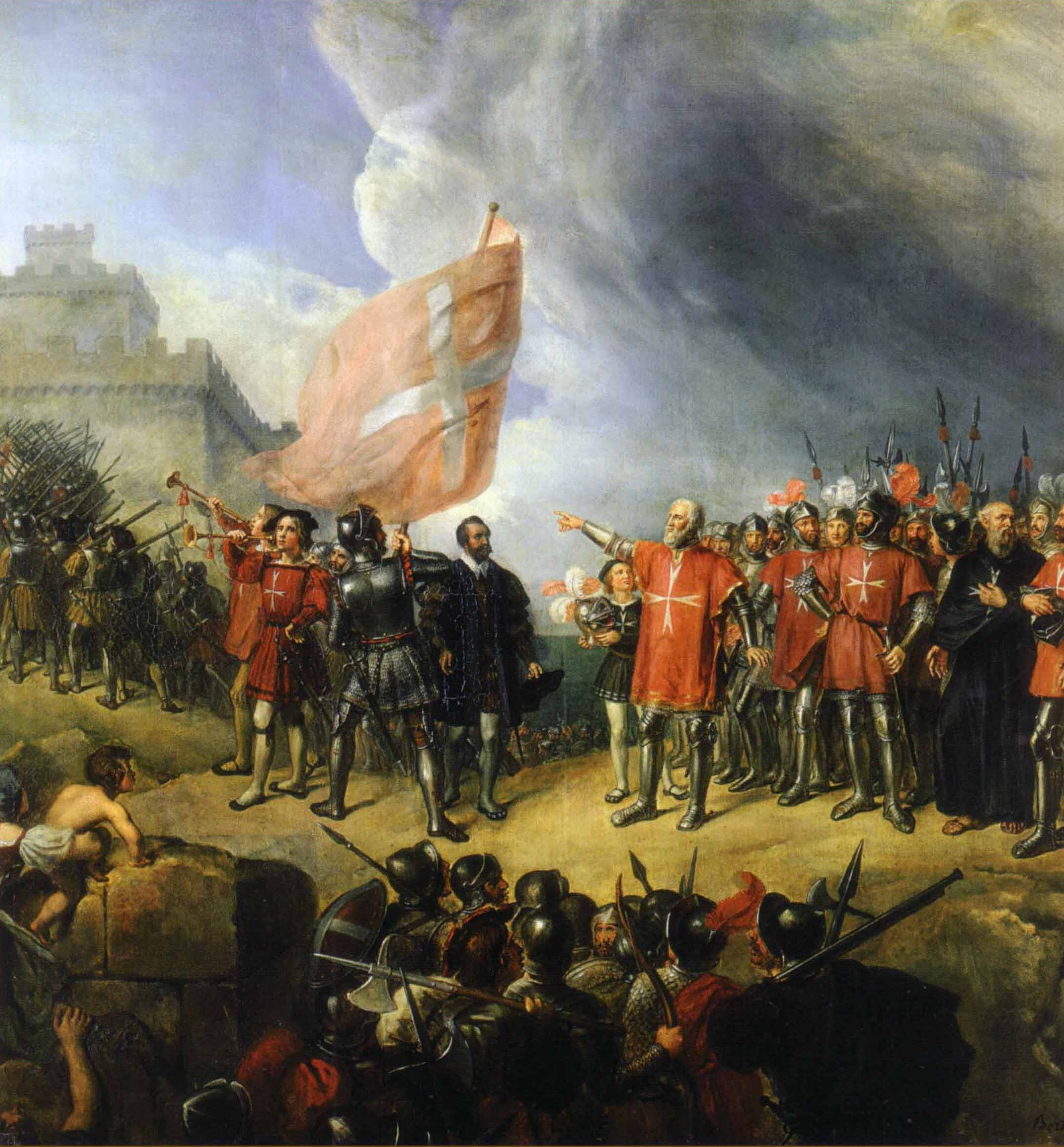
The Capture of Malta by René Théodore Berthon

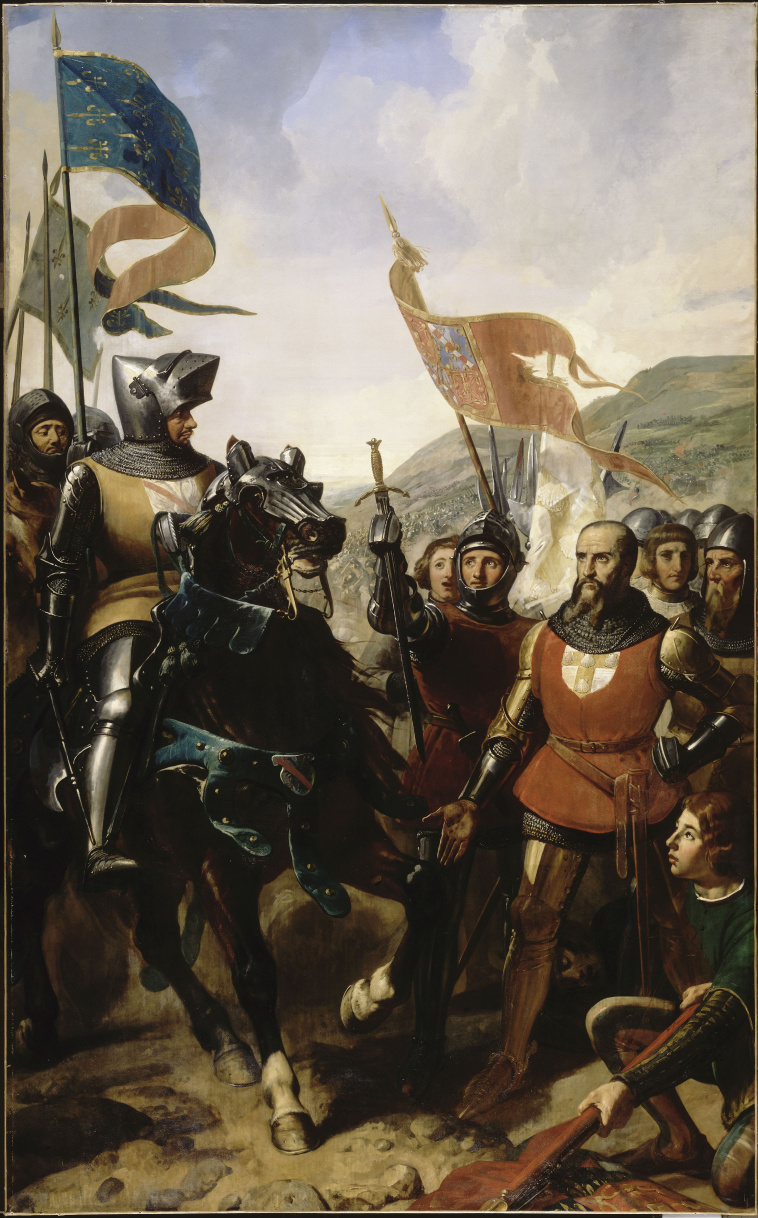
The Battle of Cocherel by Charles-Philippe Larivière

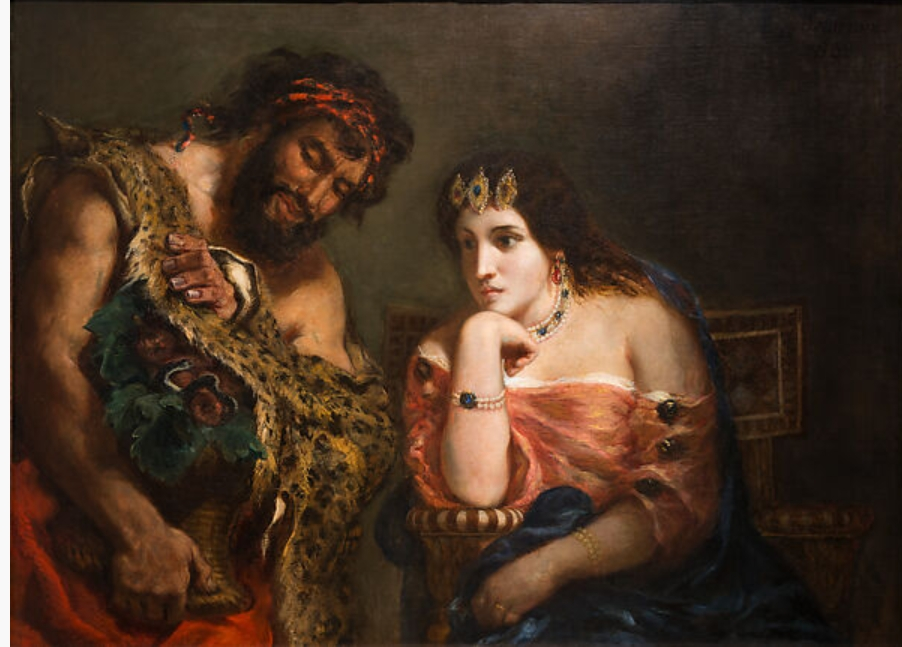
Cleopatra and the Peasant by Eugène Delacroix

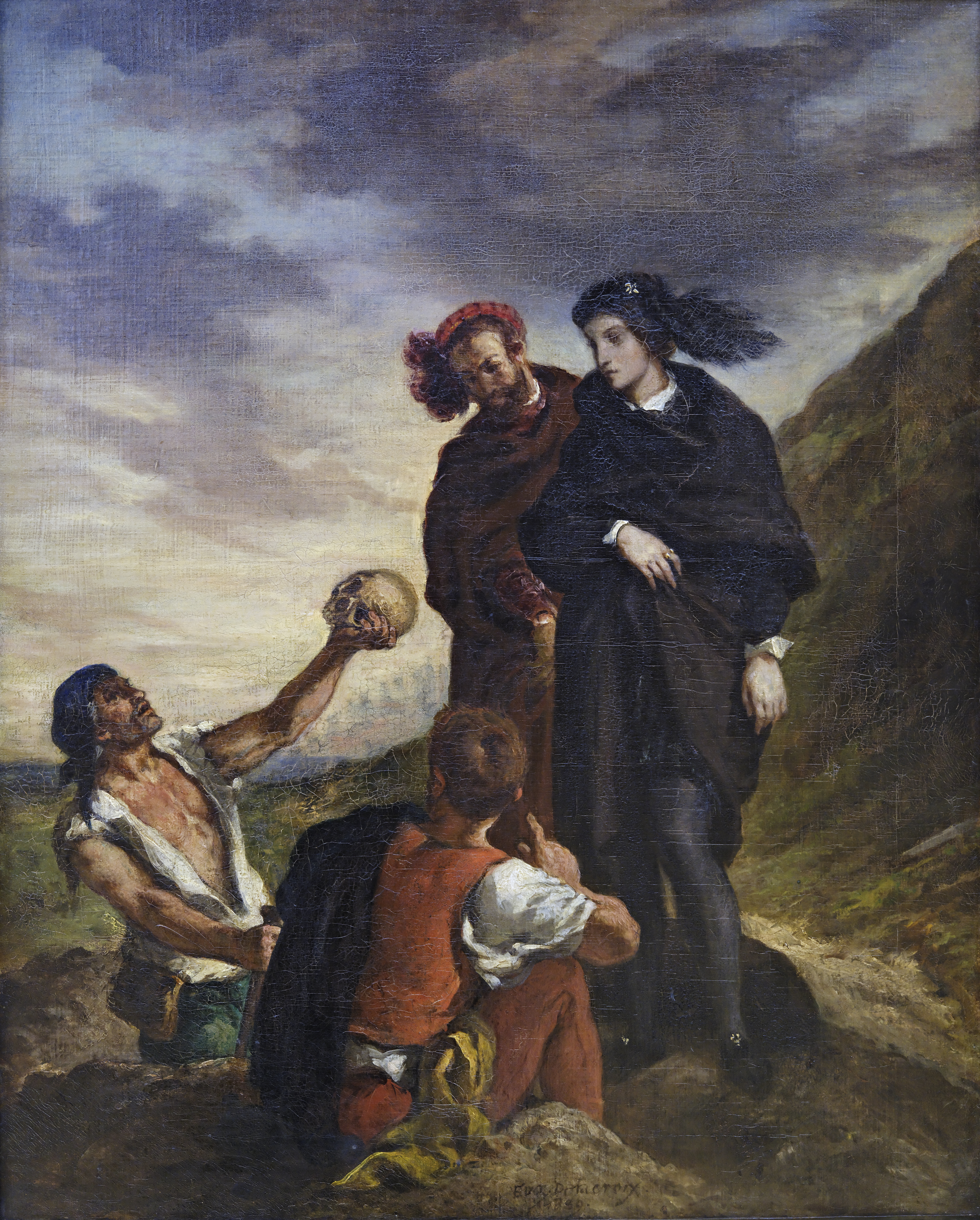
Hamlet and Horatio in the Graveyard by Eugène Delacroix

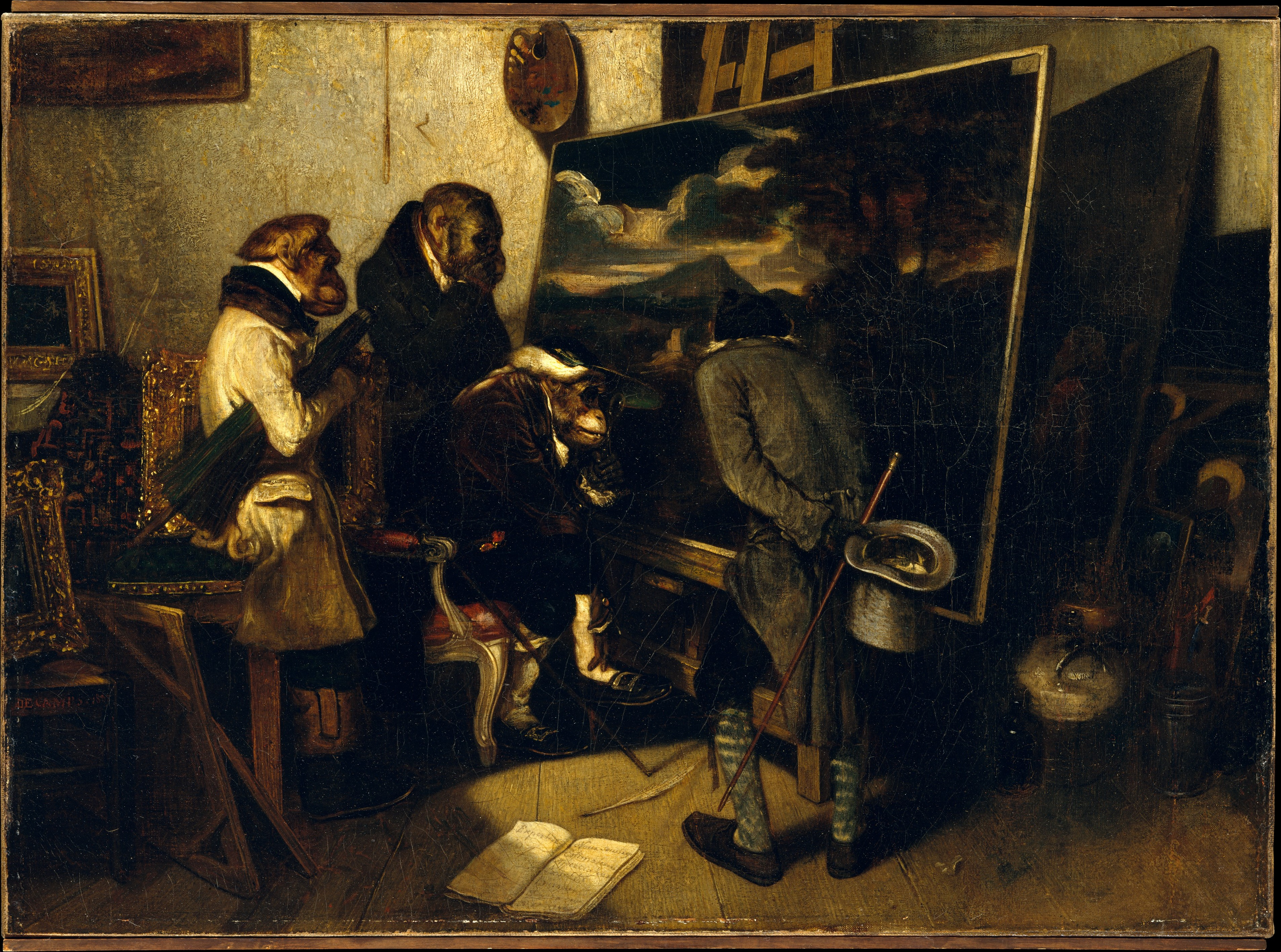
The Experts by Alexandre-Gabriel Decamps

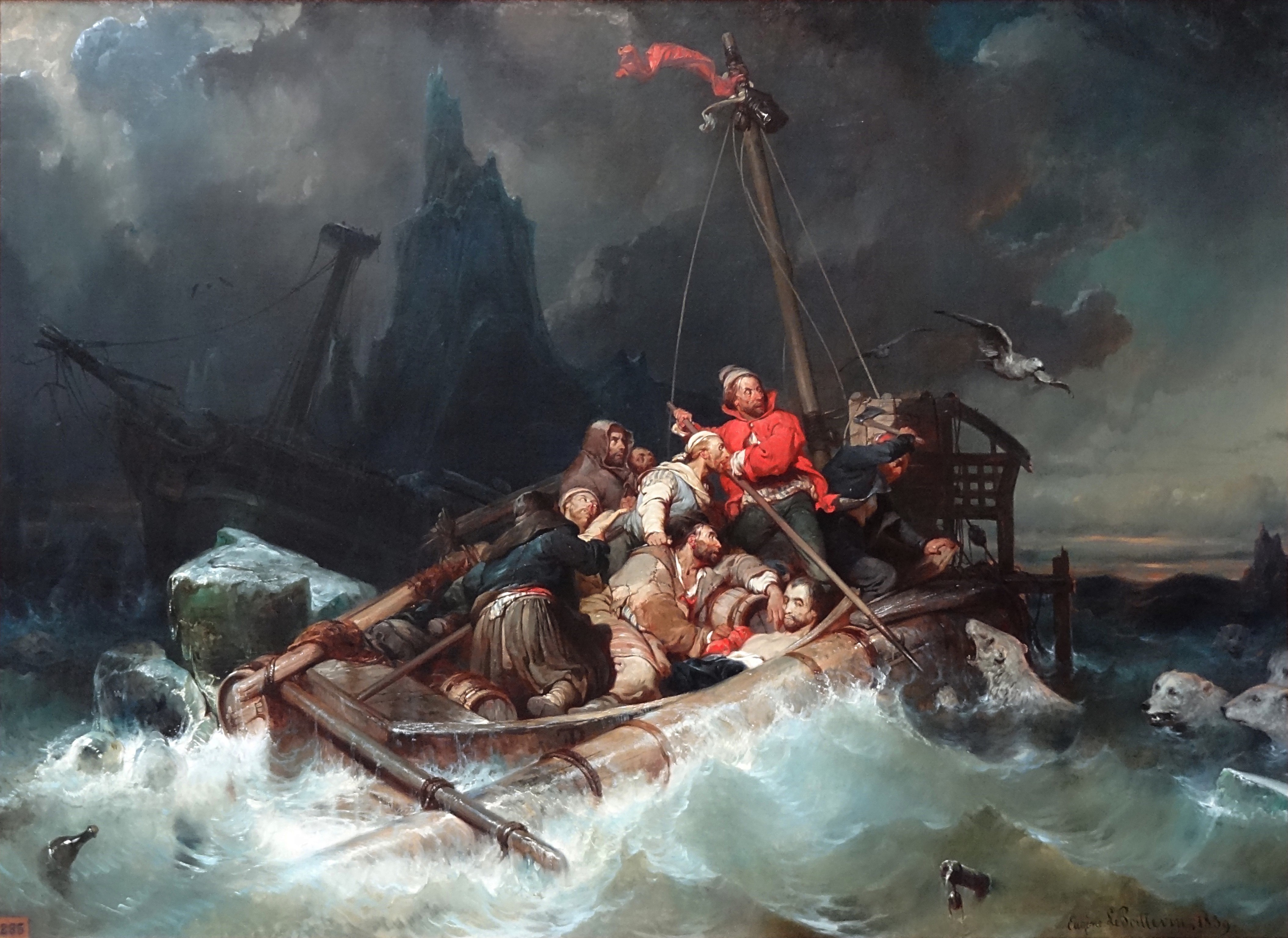
The Shipwrecked by Eugène Lepoittevin

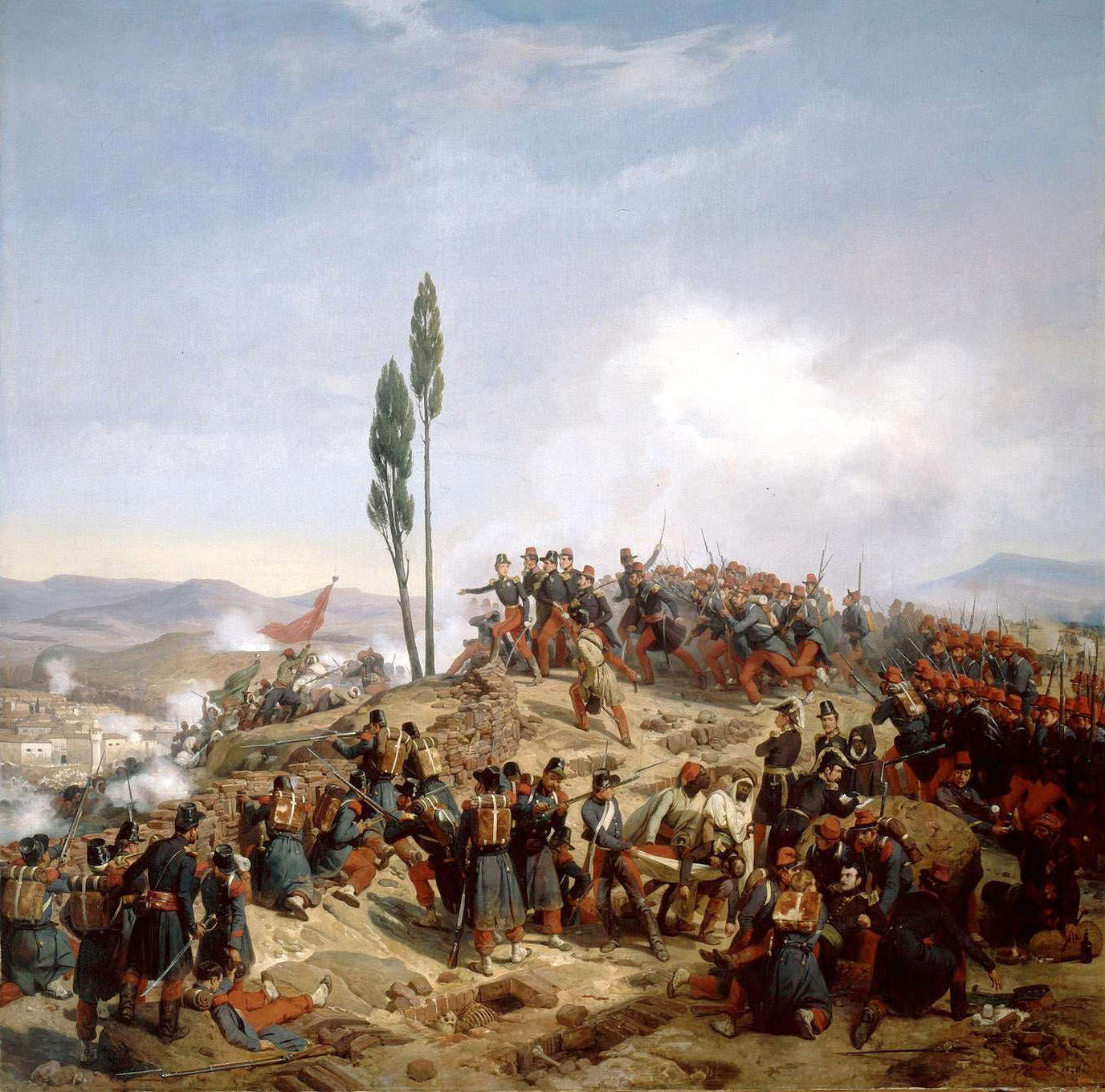
The Enemy Repelled from the Heights of Coudiat-Ati by Horace Vernet

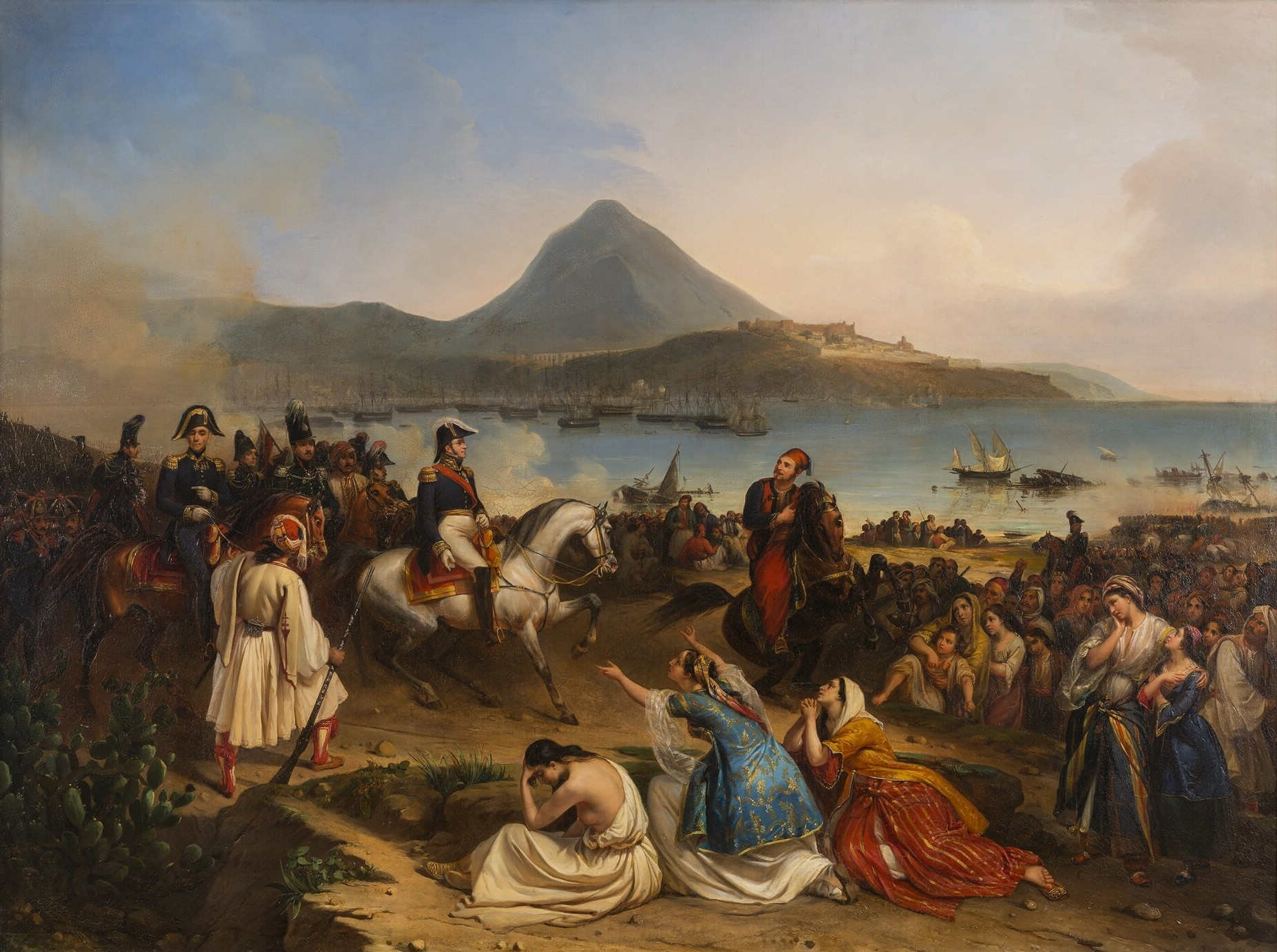
The Meeting Between General Maison and Ibrahim Pasha in Navarino by Jean-Charles Langlois

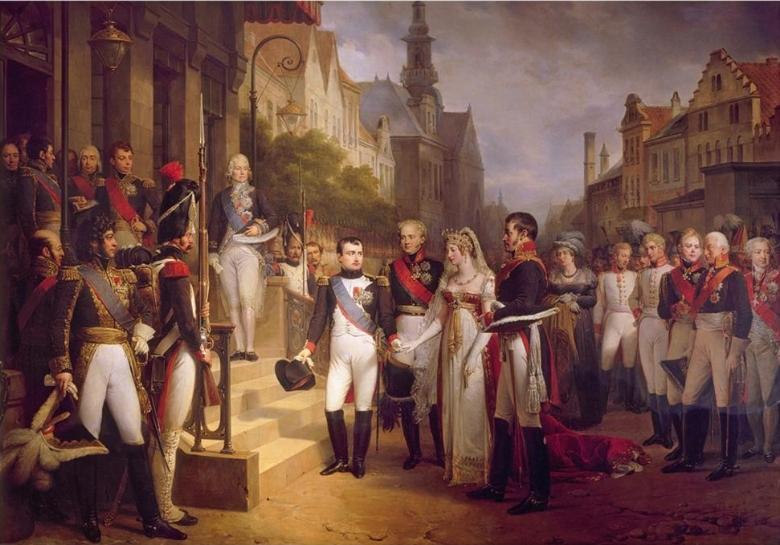
Napoleon Receiving the Queen of Prussia at Tilsit by Nicolas Gosse

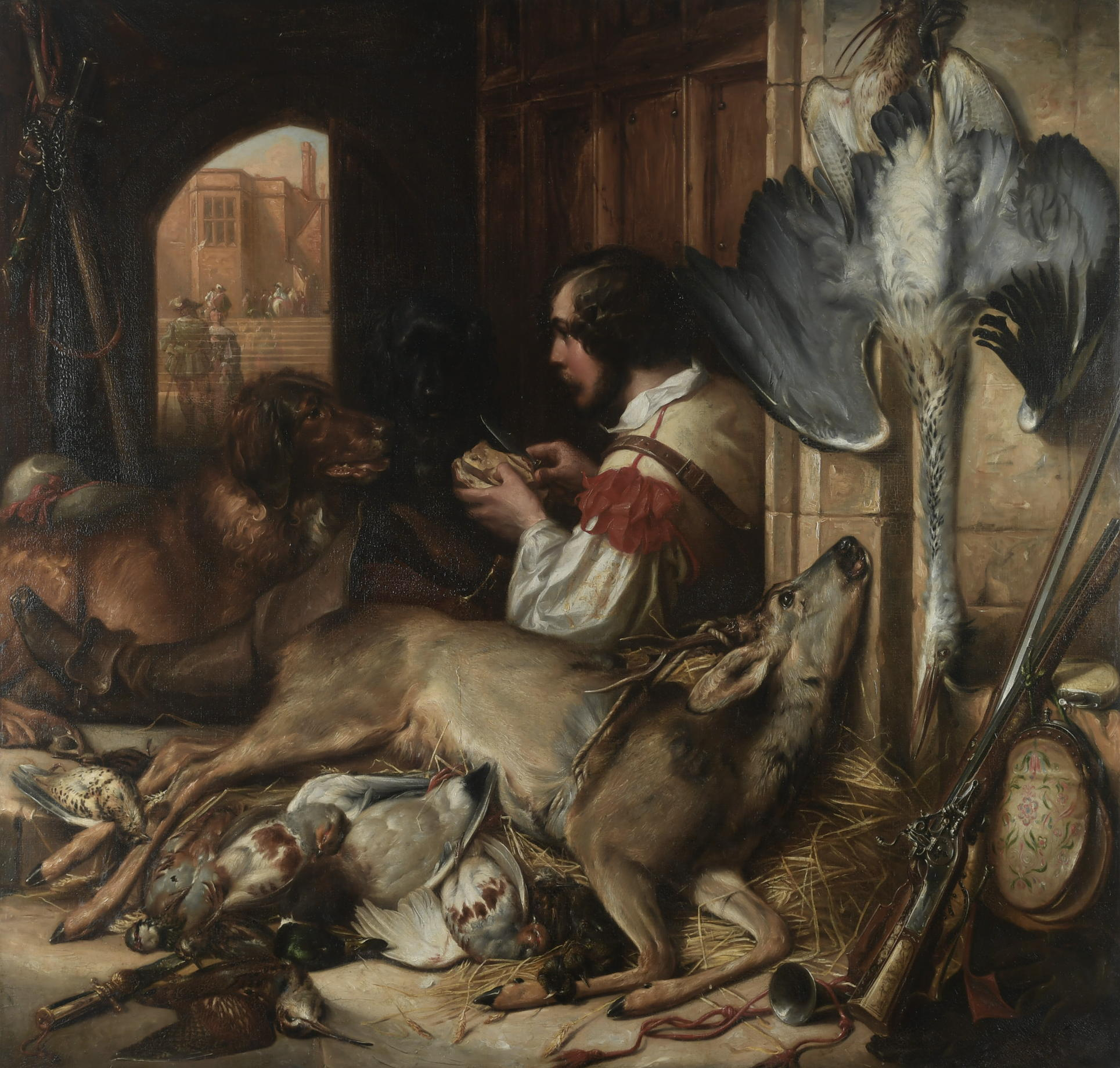
Return from Hunting by Thomas Jones Barker

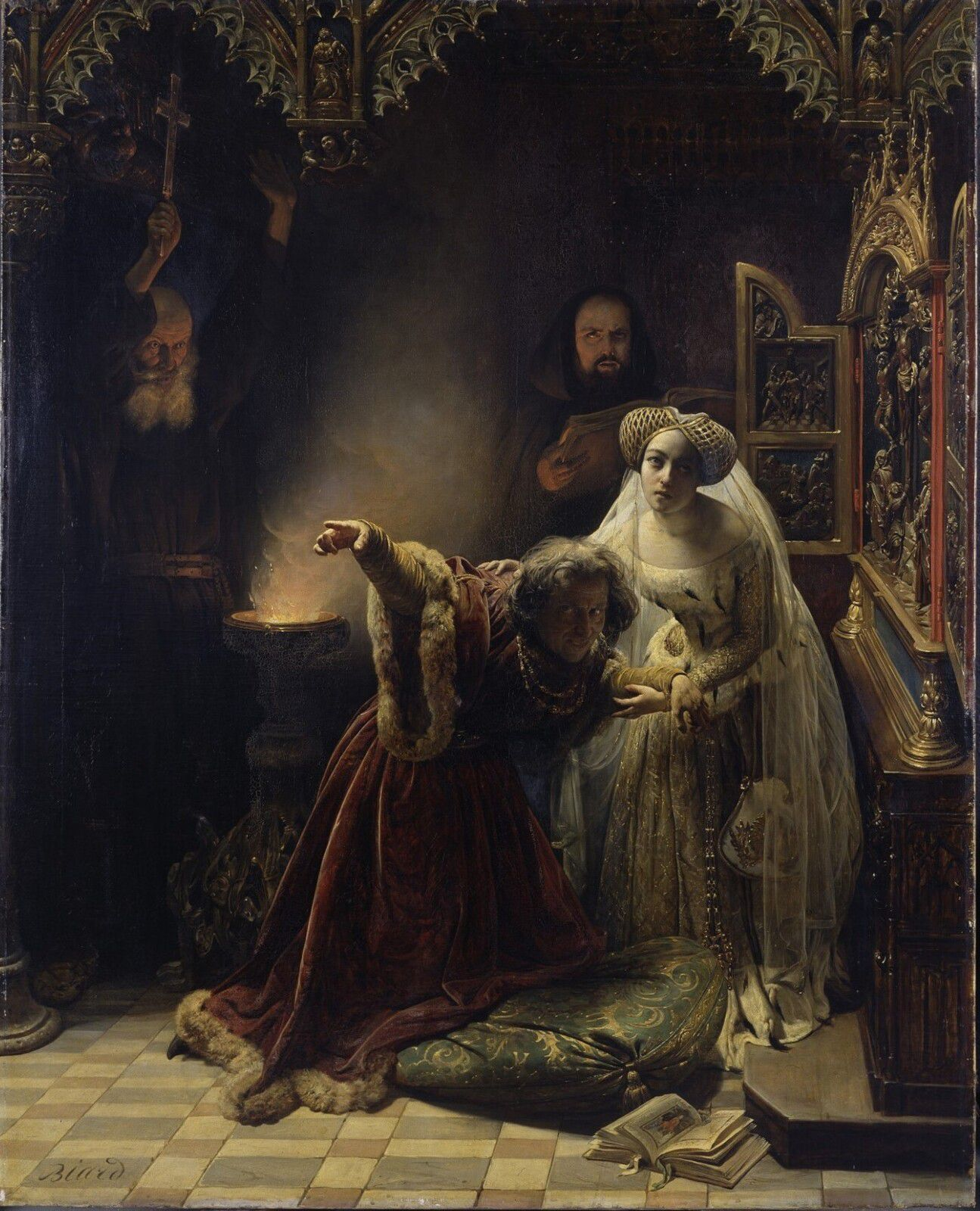
The Exorcisim of the Madness of Charles VI by François-Auguste Biard

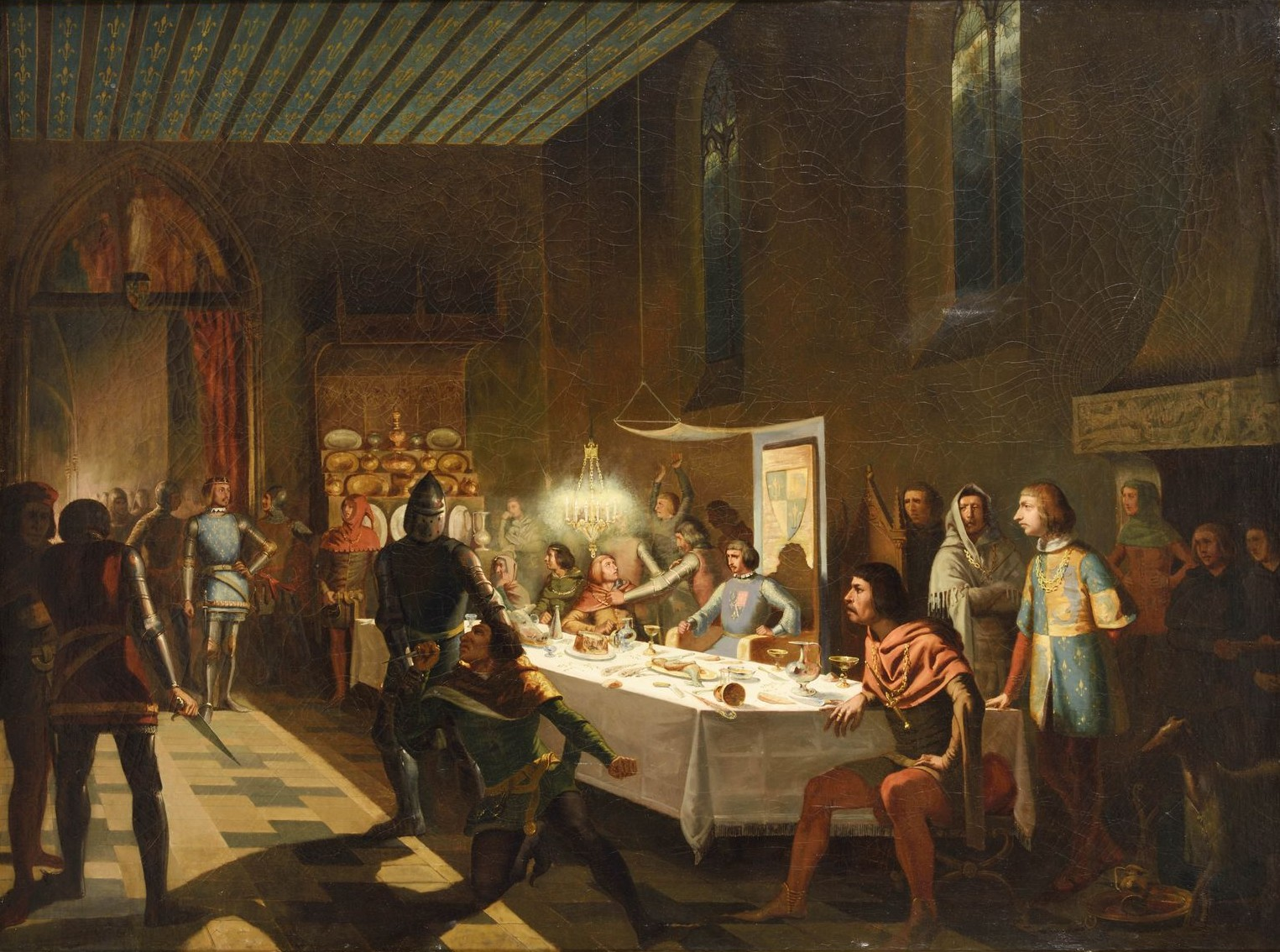
The Arrest of Charles II, King of Navarre by Antoine Rivoulon

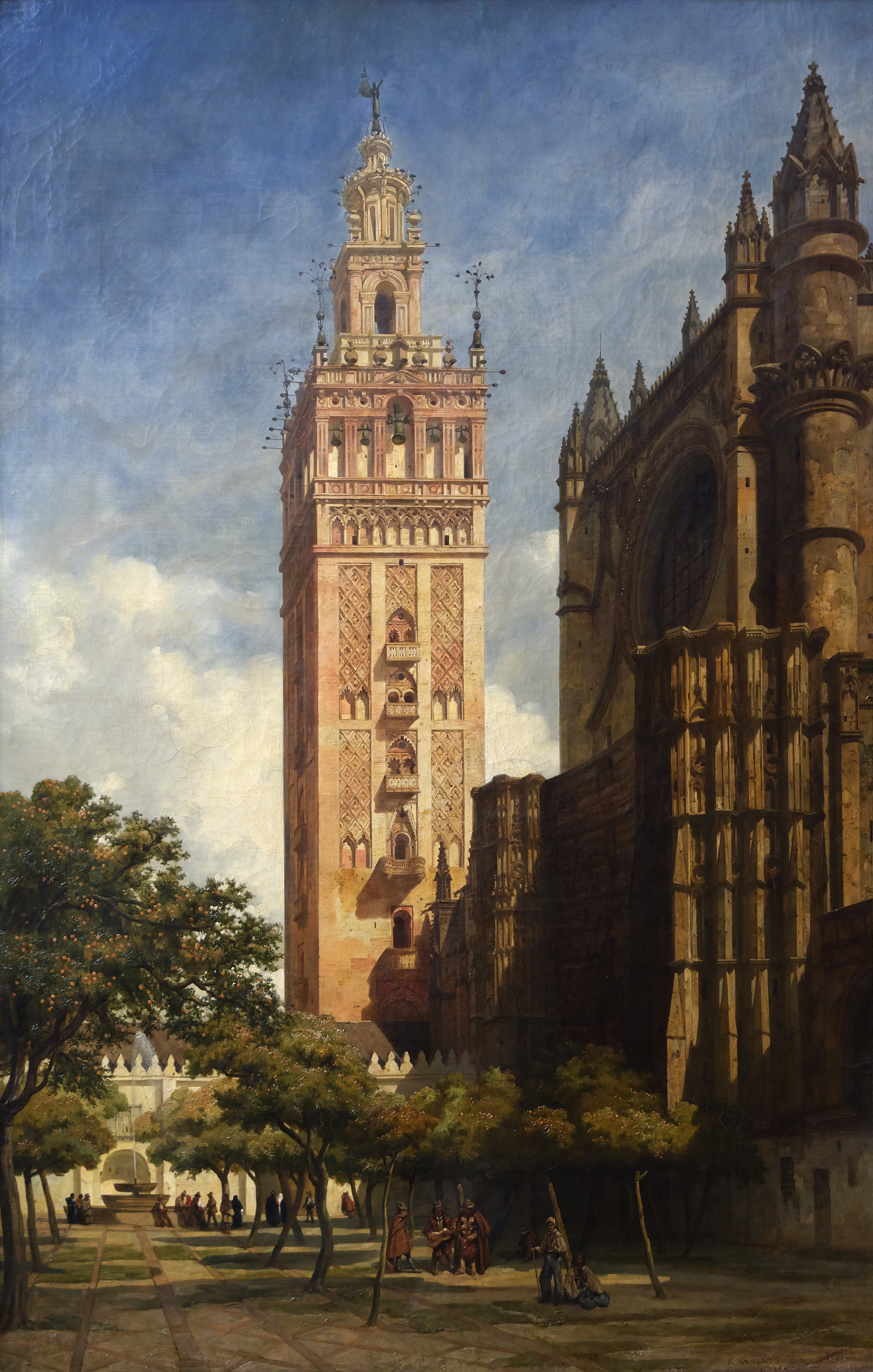
The Giralda of Seville by Adrien Dauzats

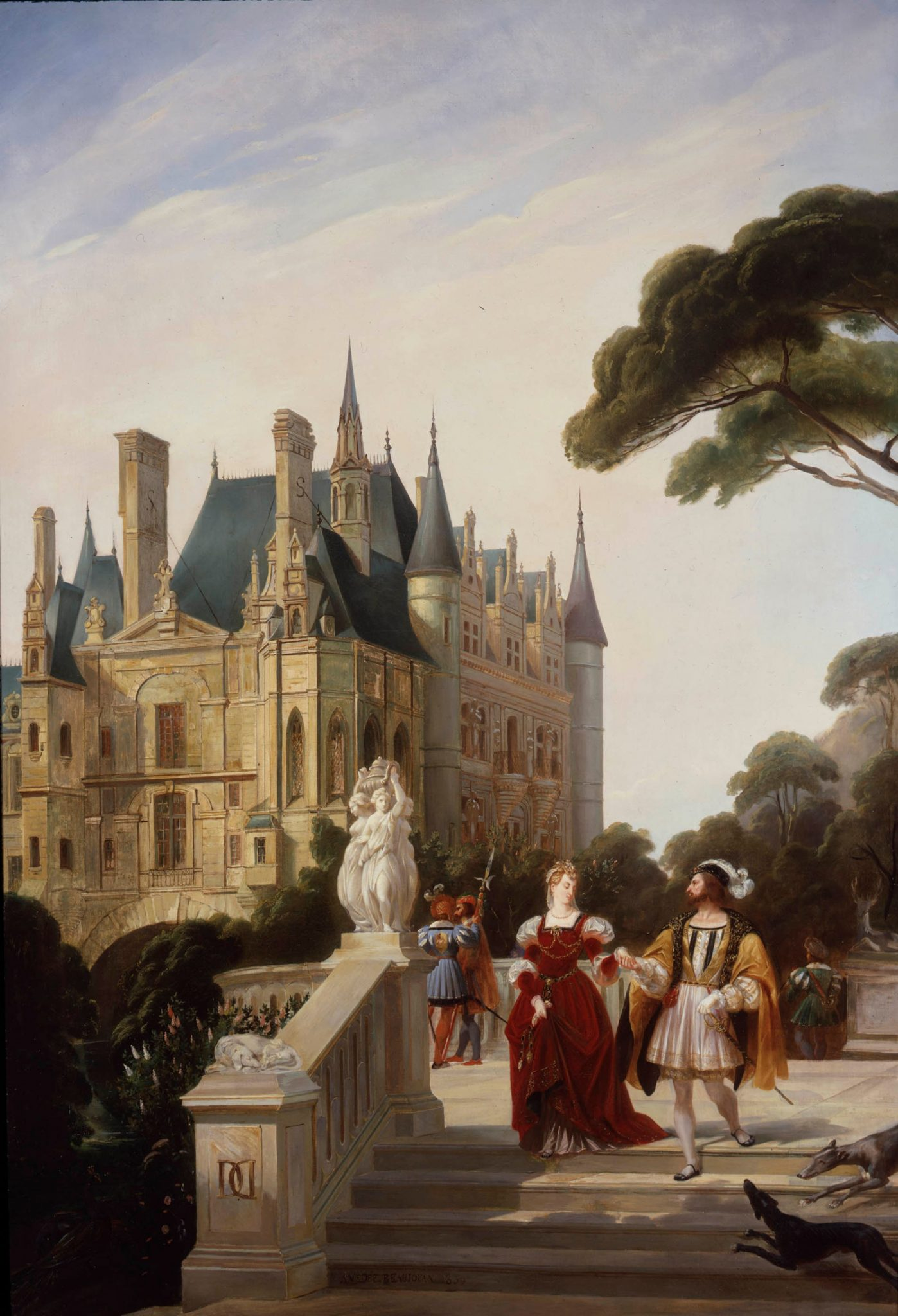
Promenade at Chenonceaux by Jean Louis Amédée Beaujouan

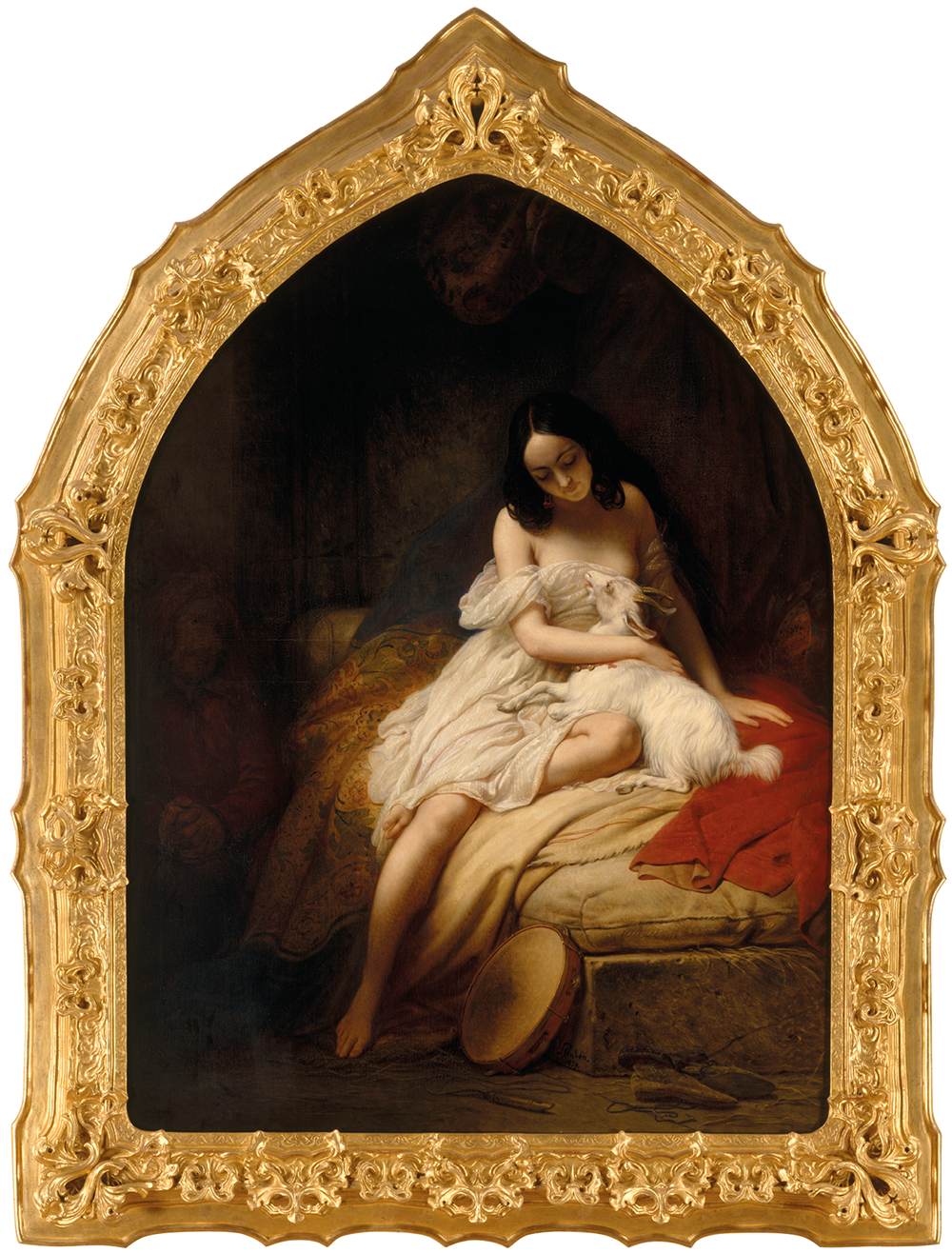
Esmerelda by Charles de Steuben

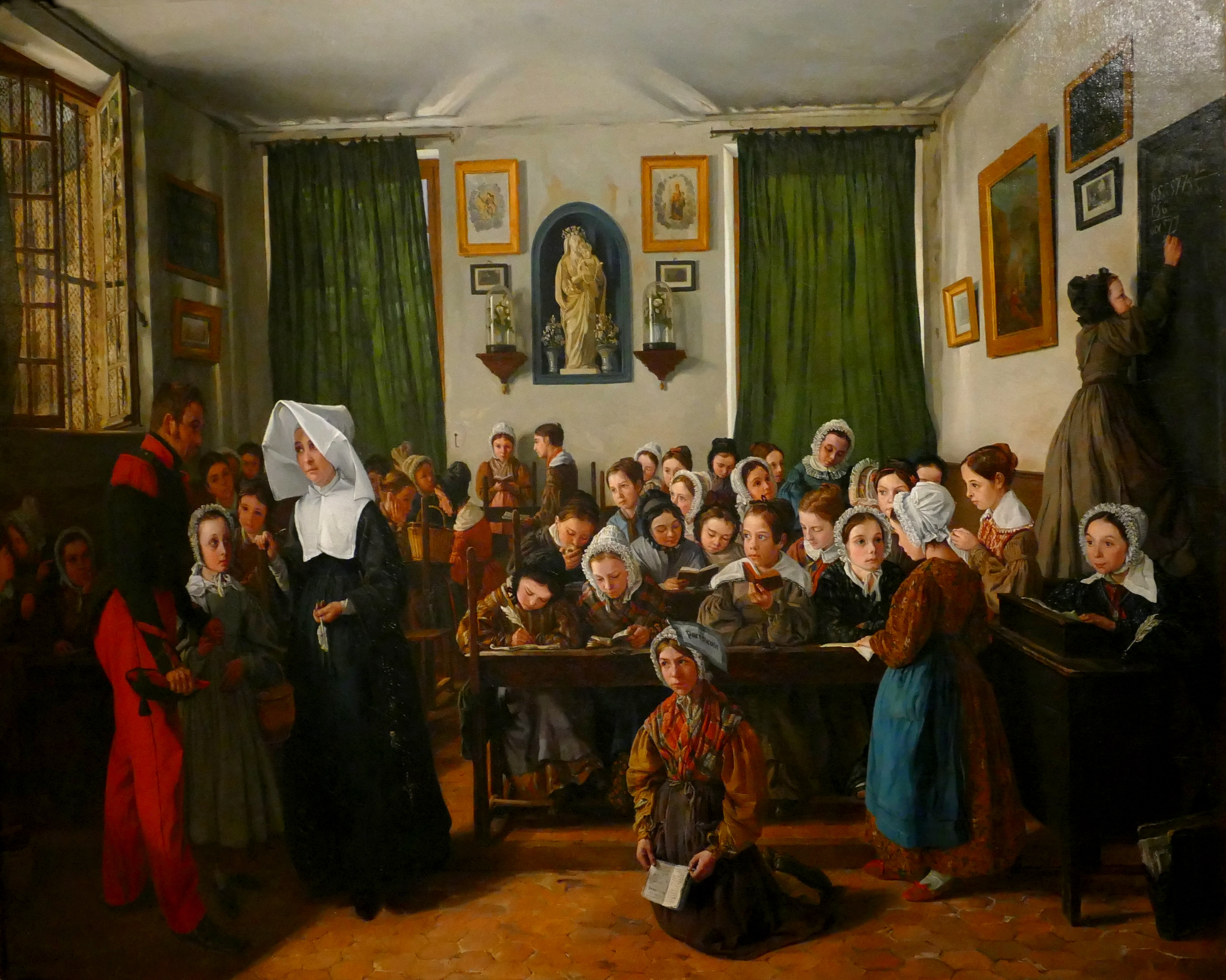
A School in Versailles by Antoinette Asselineau

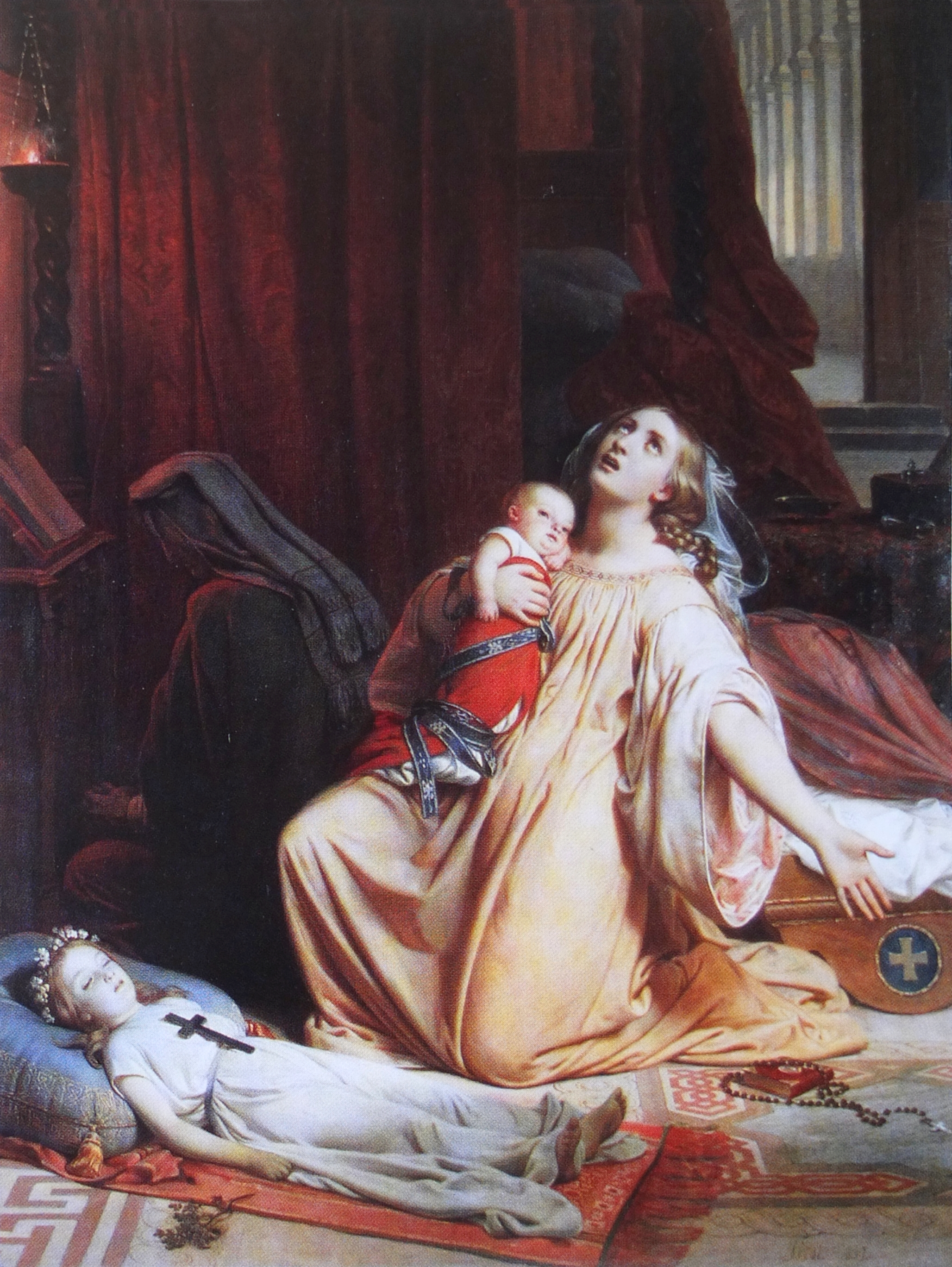
The Plague in Florence by François-Édouard Picot

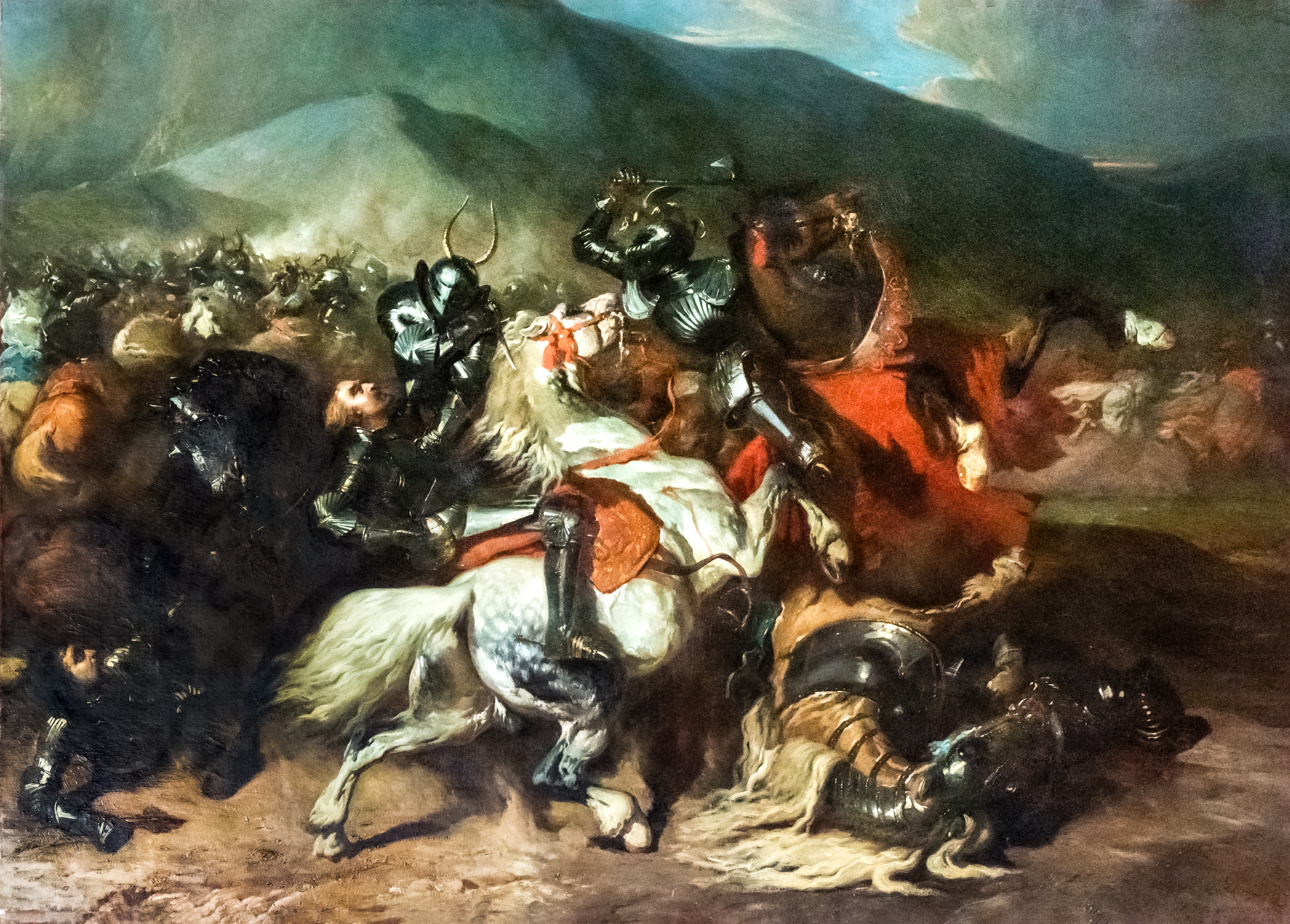
The Battle of Baugé by Alfred de Dreux

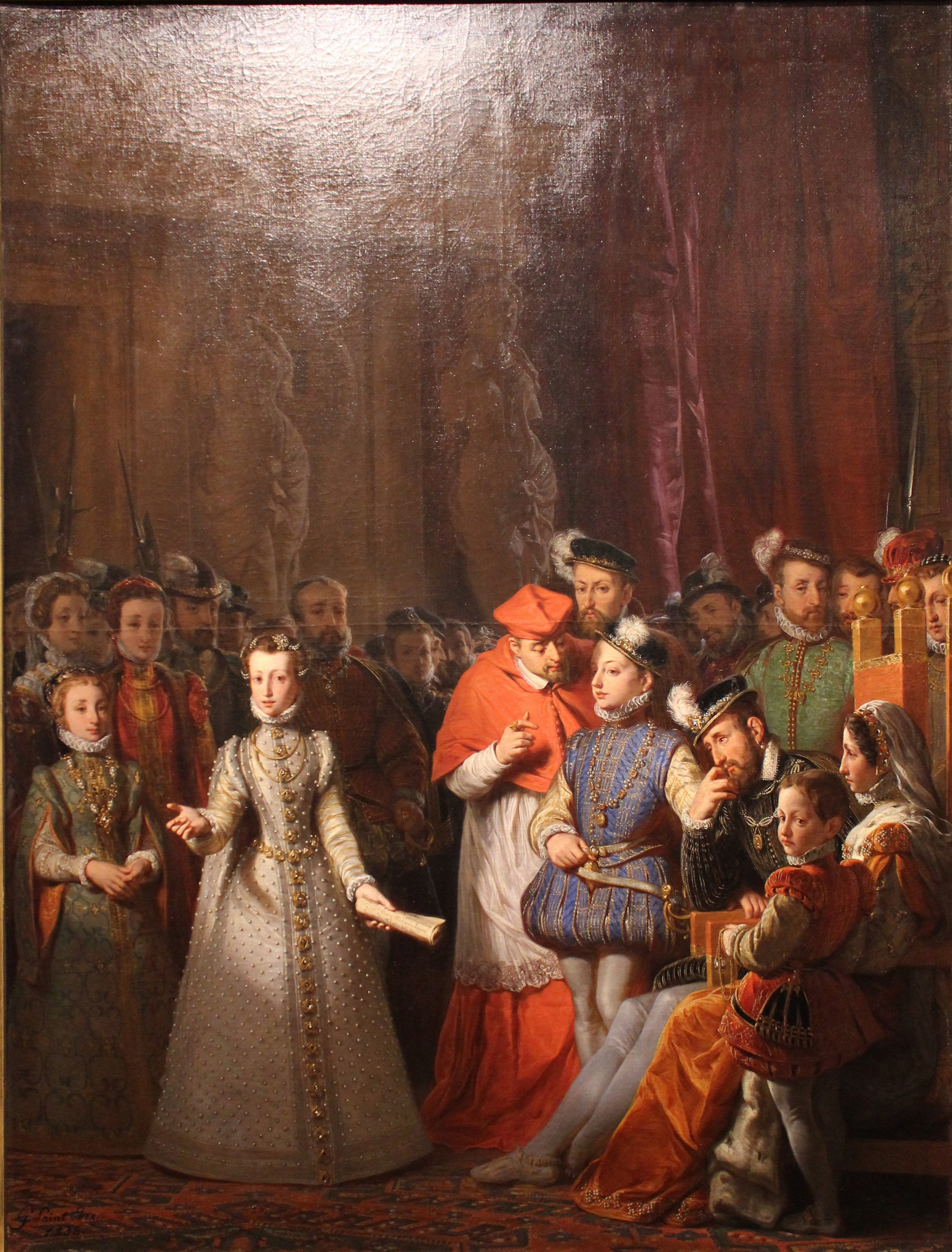
The Education of Mary Stuart at the Court of Francis II by Gillot Saint-Evre

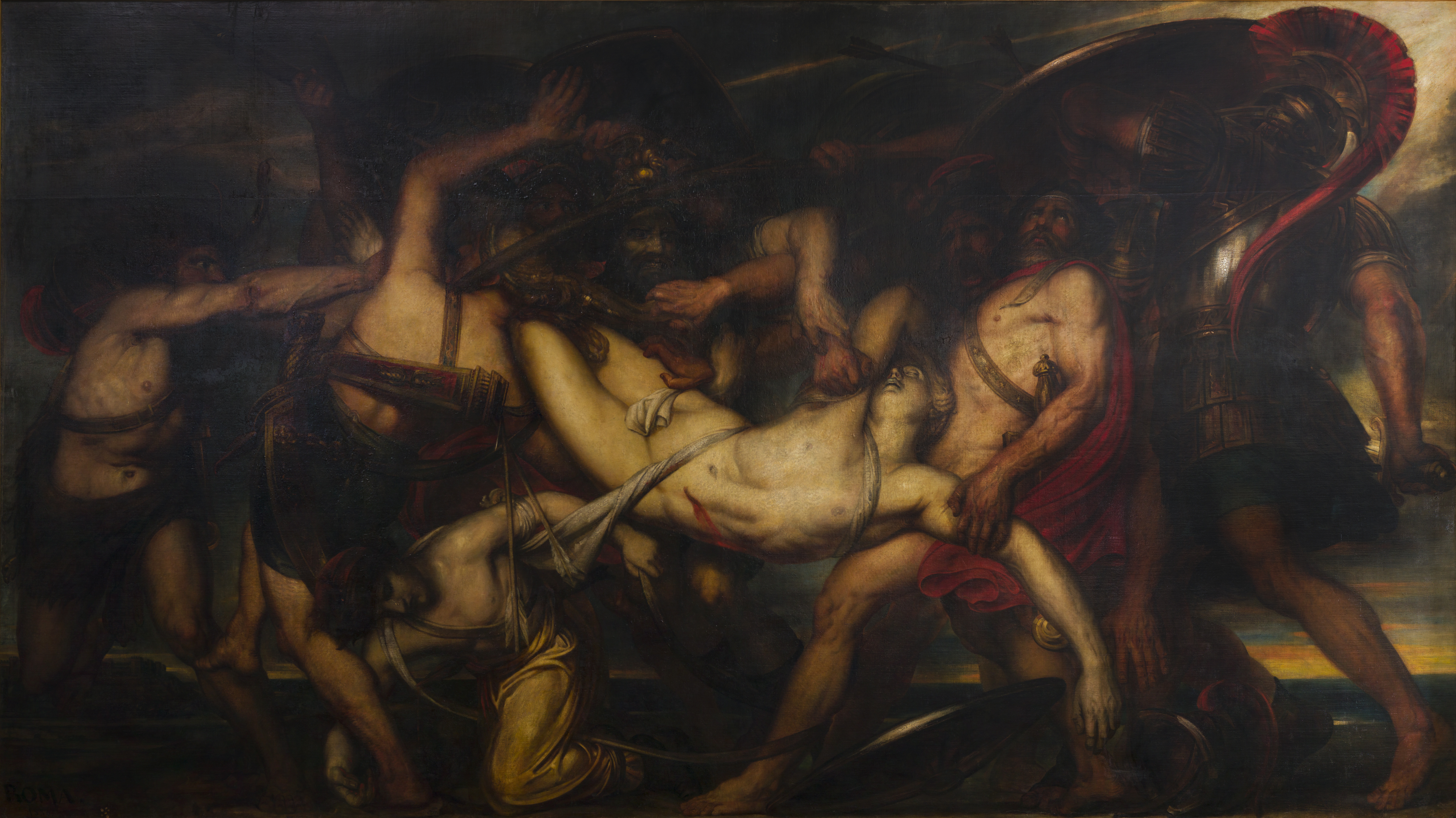
The Greeks and the Trojans Fighting over the Body of Patroclus by Antoine Wiertz

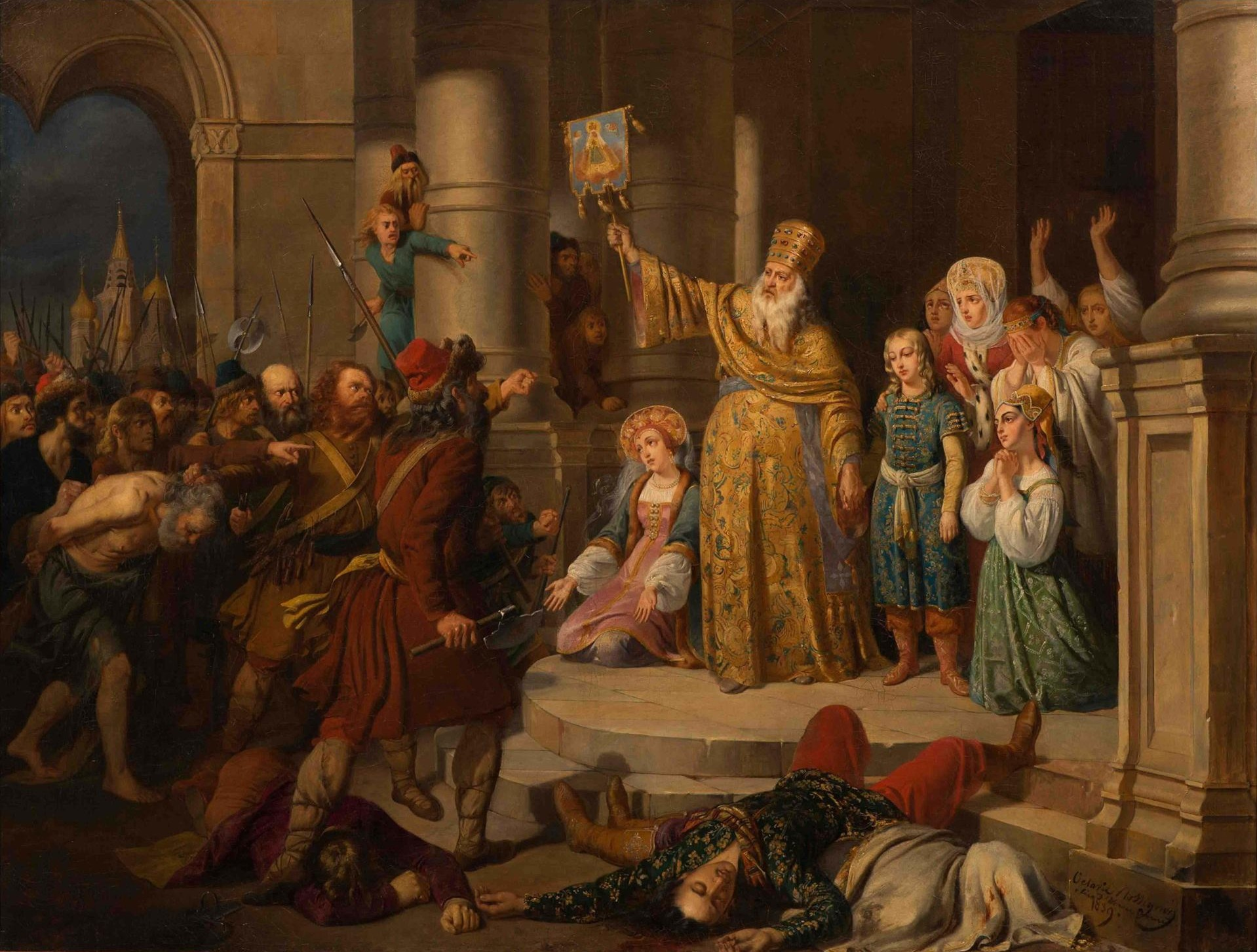
The Streltsy Uprising by Octavie Rossignon

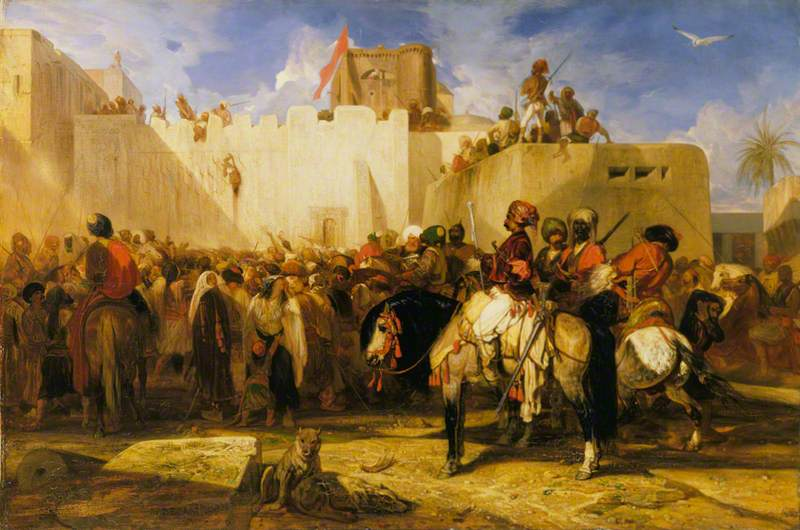
The Punishment of the Hooks by Alexandre-Gabriel Decamps

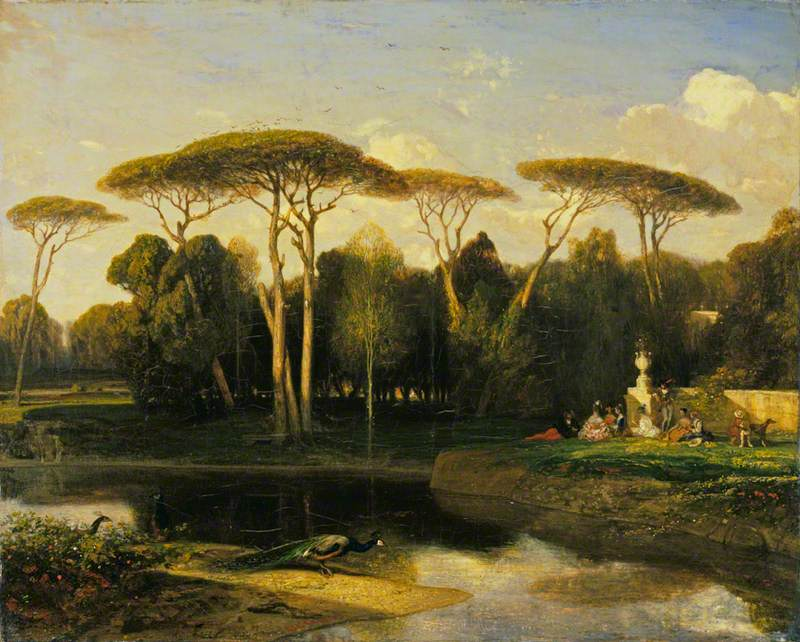
The Villa Doria Pamphilj, Rome by Alexandre-Gabriel Decamps

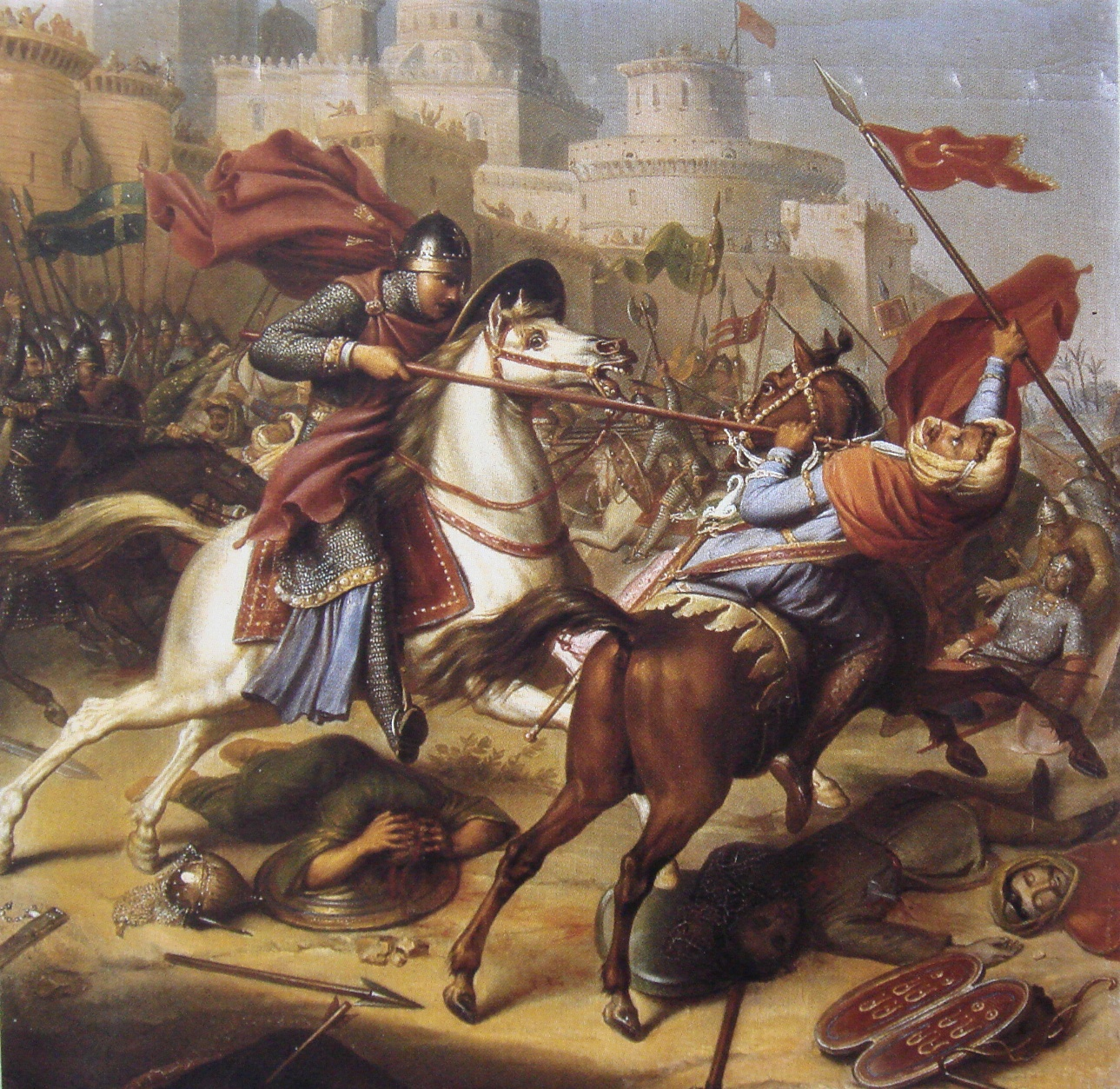
Robert of Normandy at the Siege of Antioch by Jean-Joseph Dassy

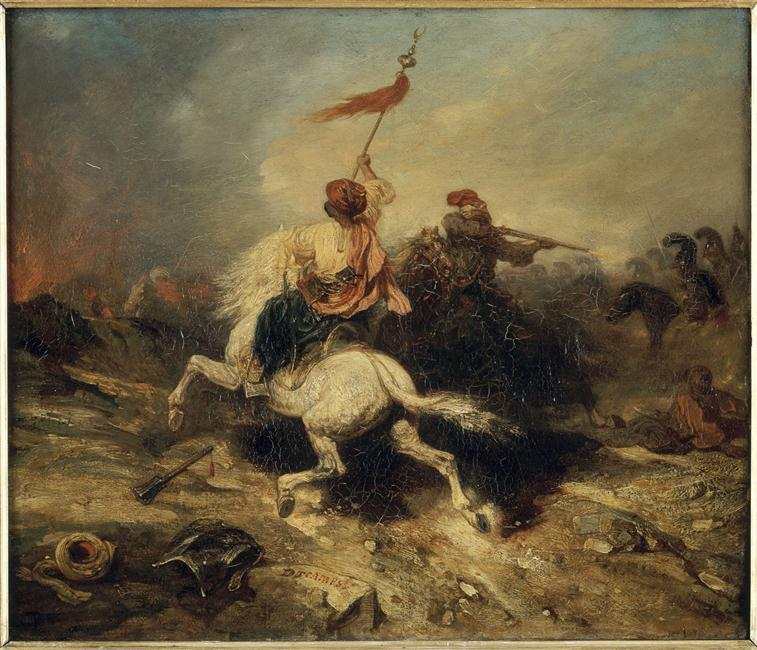
Turkish Horseman by Alexandre-Gabriel Decamps

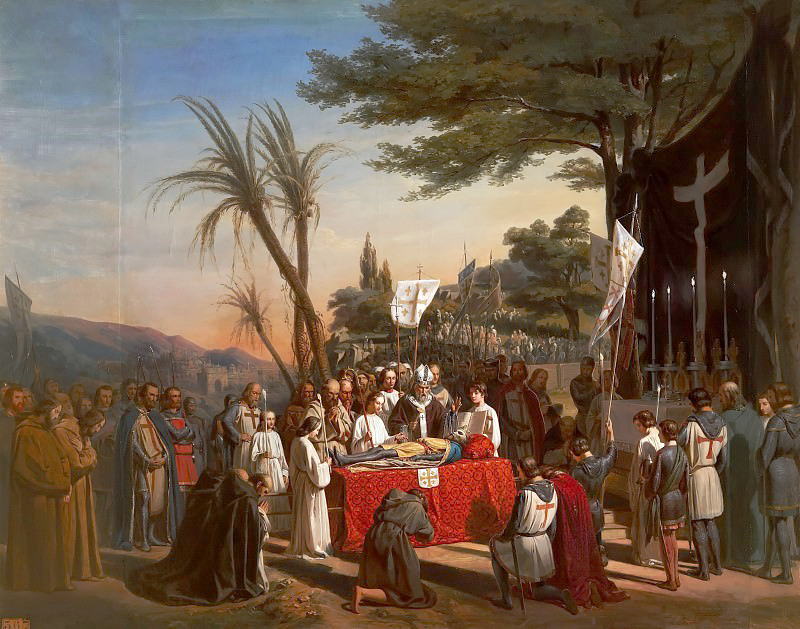
Funeral of Godfrey of Bouillon on the Mount of Calvary by Édouard Cibot

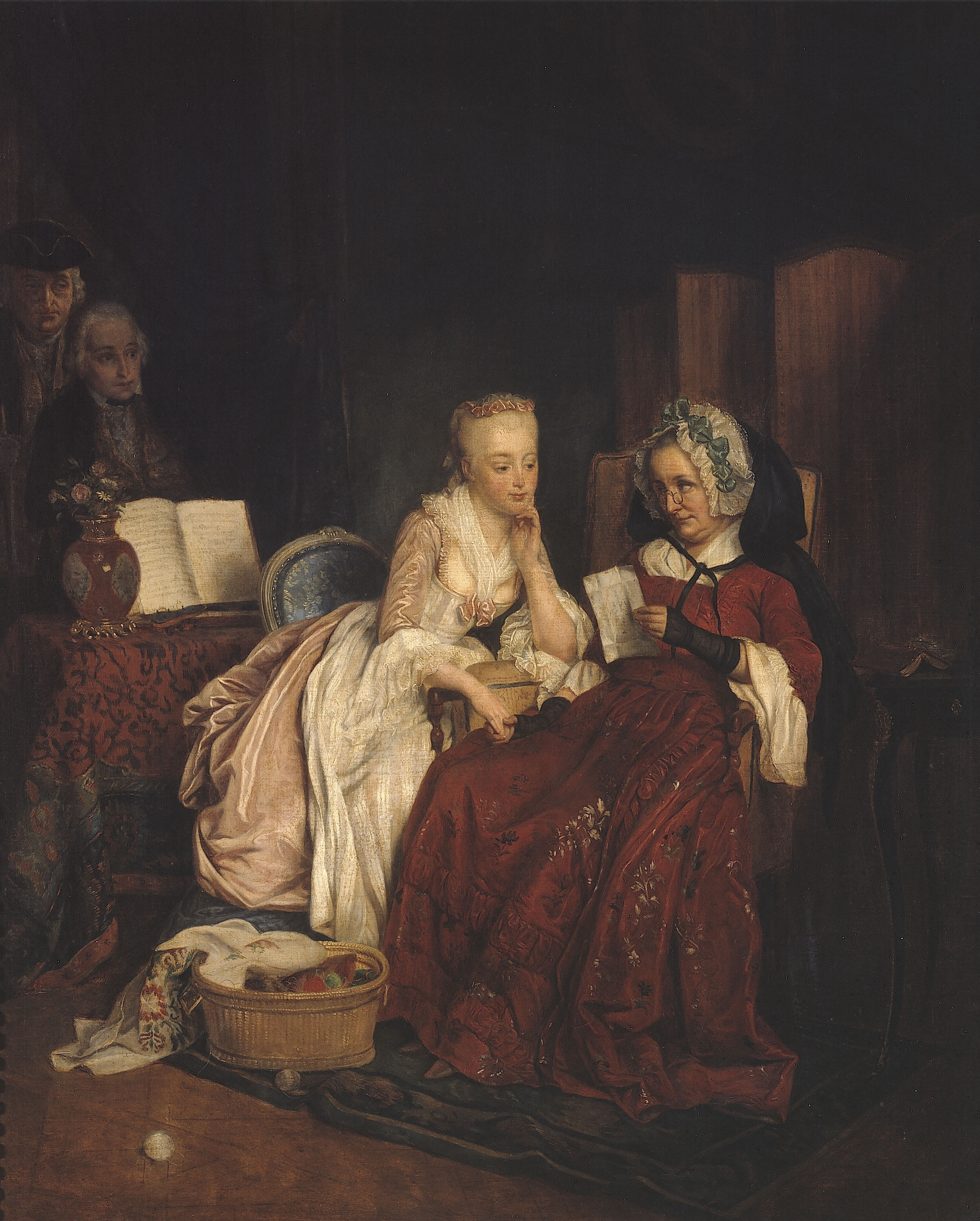
A Proposal of Marriage by Jean Alphonse Roehn

Young Swiss Woman from Brientz by Joseph-Désiré Court

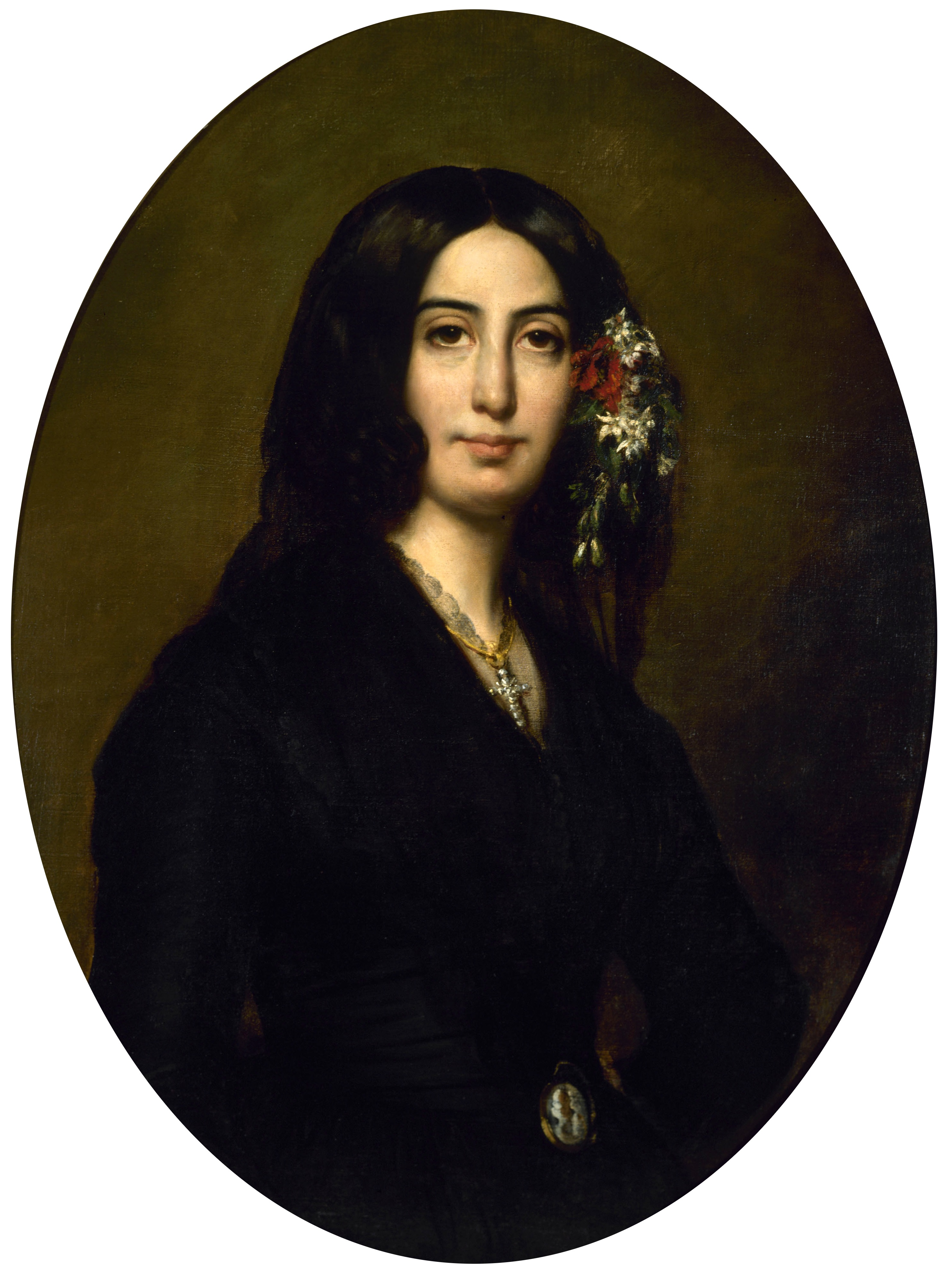
Portrait of George Sand by Auguste Charpentier

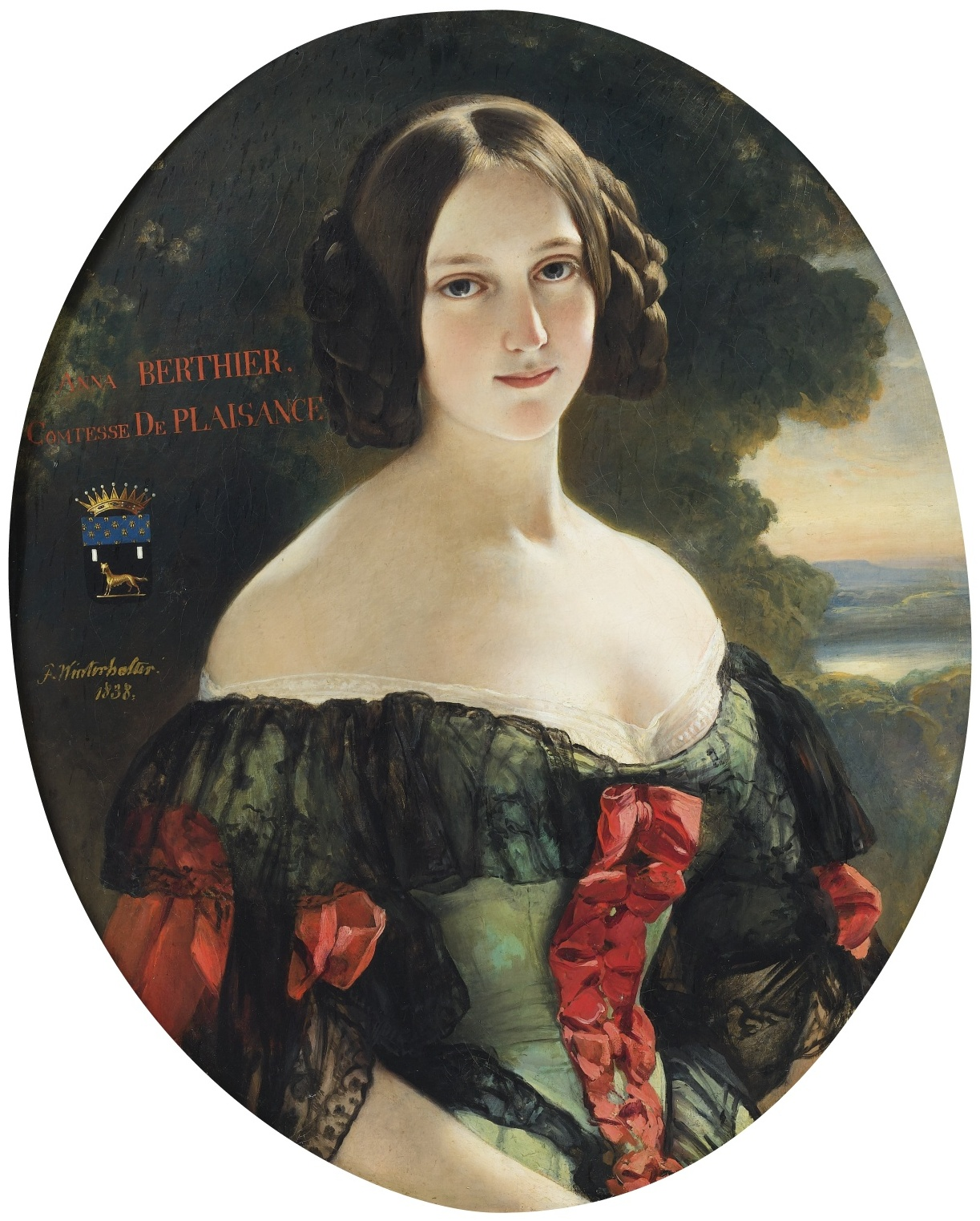
Portrait of Anne Berthier de Wagram by Franz Xaver Winterhalter

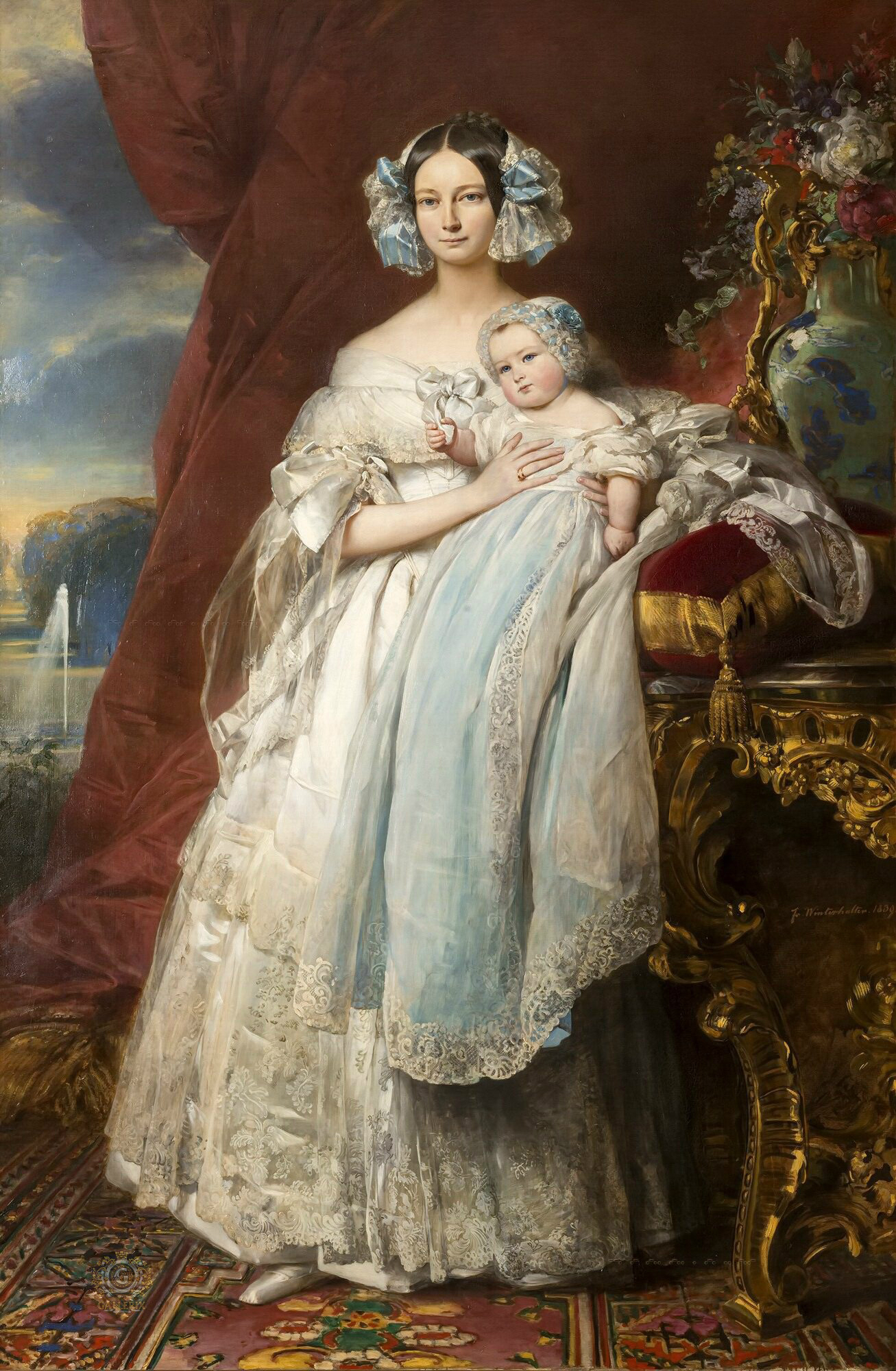
Portrait of the Duchess of Orleans by Franz Xaver Winterhalter

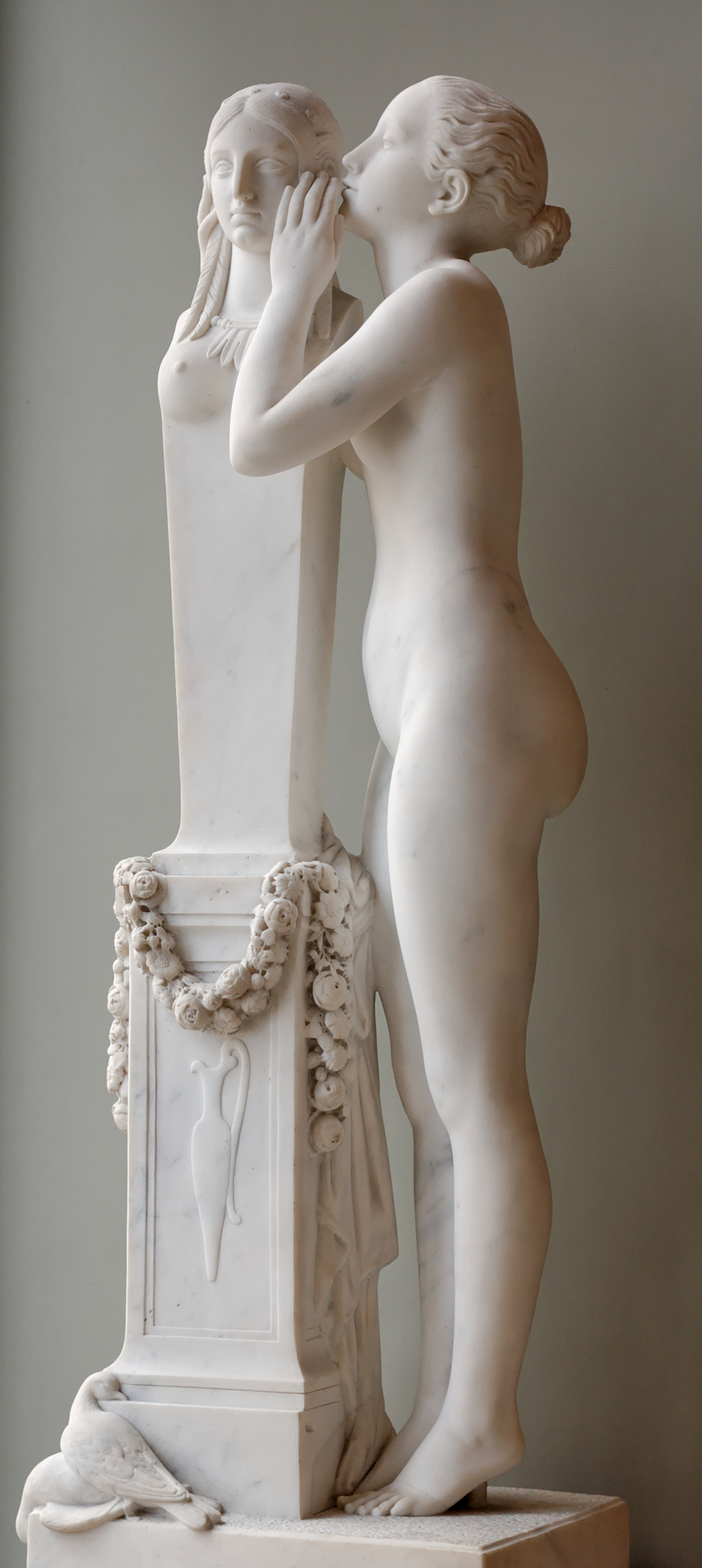
First Confidence to Venus by François Jouffroy

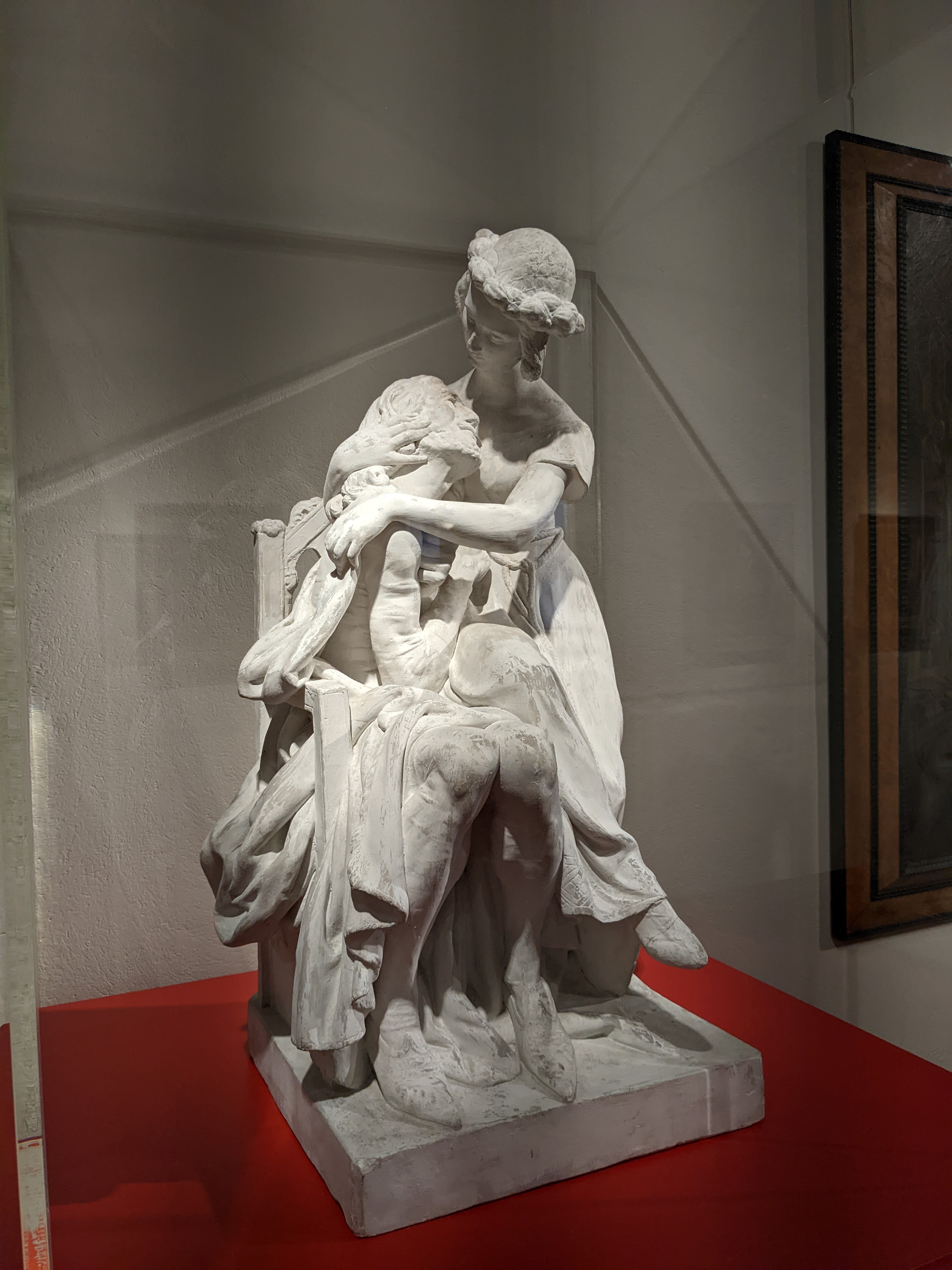
Charles VI and Odette de Champdivers by Victor Huguenin

== See also ==
- Royal Academy Exhibition of 1839, which took place at the National Gallery in London

== Bibliography ==
- Allard, Sébastien & Fabre, Côme. Delacroix. Metropolitan Museum of Art, 2018.
- Boime, Albert. Art in an Age of Counterrevolution, 1815-1848. University of Chicago Press, 2004.
- Hornstein, Katie. Picturing War in France, 1792–1856. Yale University Press, 2018.
- Murray, Christopher John. Encyclopedia of the Romantic Era, 1760–1850, Volume 2. Taylor & Francis, 2004.
