= Cleopatra and the Peasant =

Painting by Eugène Delacroix

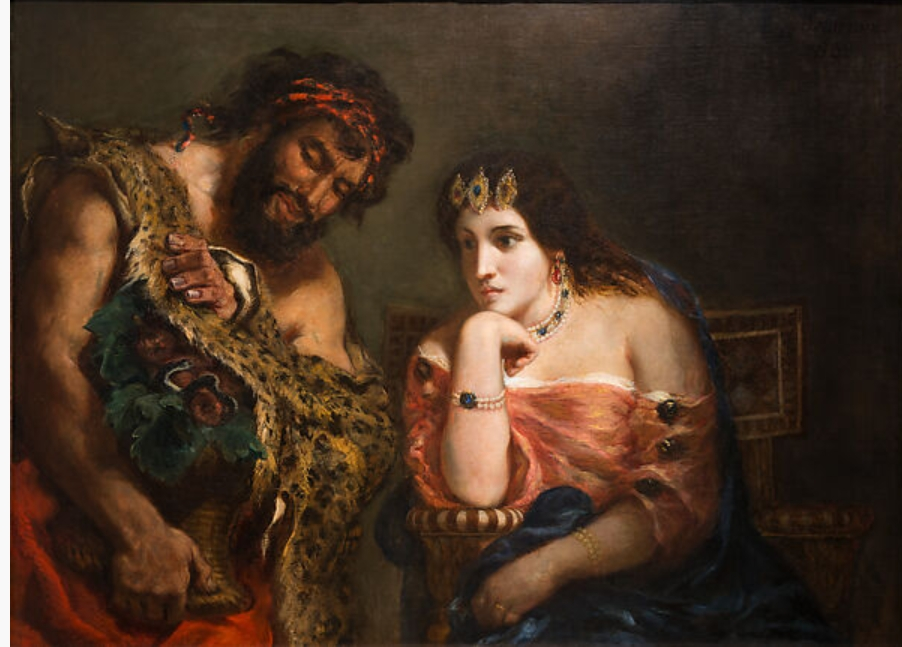
- Artist: Eugène Delacroix
- Year: 1838
- Type: Oil on canvas, history painting
- Dimensions: 97.8 cm × 127 cm (38.5 in × 50 in)
- Location: Ackland Art Museum; North Carolina

Cleopatra and the Peasant is an 1838 history painting by the French artist Eugène Delacroix. Romantic in style, it depicts the moments before the Death of Cleopatra. Planning to commit suicide after the defeat of her forces at the hands of Augustus during the War of Actium, the Queen of Egypt prepares to commit suicide with an asp brought to her by the peasant on the left. Delacroix based Cleopatra on the artist Elisa Boulanger who he had a brief relationship with.

It reveals a new influence on the artist of the Caravaggesque painters of the seventeenth century. Delacroix exhibited the painting at the Salon of 1839 at the Louvre in Paris. Today it is in the collection of the Ackland Art Museum at the University of North Carolina at Chapel Hill.

== Bibliography ==
- Allard, Sébastien & Fabre, Côme. Delacroix. Metropolitan Museum of Art, 2018.
- Alston, Isabella. Delacroix. TAJ Books International, 2014.
- Levitt, Theresa. The Shadow of Enlightenment: Optical and Political Transparency in France 1789-1848. Oxford University Press, 2009.
- Tinterow, Gary & Conisbee, Philip (ed.) Portraits by Ingres: Image of an Epoch. Metropolitan Museum of Art, 1999.
