= 1867 in art =

Events from the year 1867 in art.

== Events ==
- 15 April – The Salon of 1867 opens at the Palace of Industry in Paris
- Exposition Universelle in Paris helps popularize Japanese woodblock prints in the West.
- Engravings of William Holman Hunt's The Finding of the Saviour in the Temple by Auguste III Blanchard are published by dealer Ernest Gambart in London, in editions totalling 13,000.

== Works ==
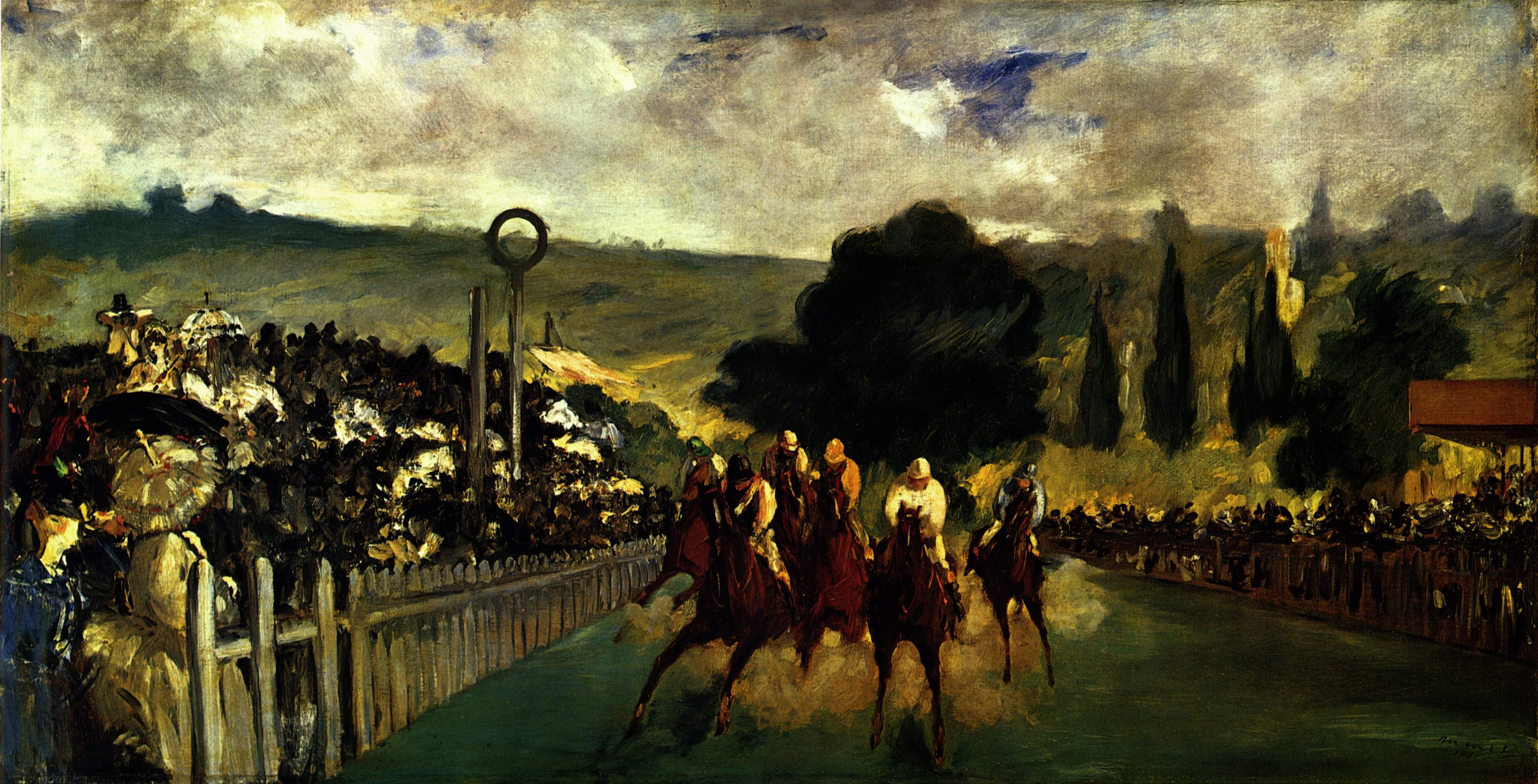
Manet – The Races at Longchamp

- Frédéric Bazille – approximate date
  - Family Reunion
  - The Little Gardener
  - Portrait of Renoir
- Jean-Adolphe Beaucé – General Bazaine Attacks Fort San Xavier During the Siege of Puebla
- George Henry Boughton – Pilgrims Going To Church
- Richard Burchett – Sanctuary
- William Burges – Narcissus washstand
- Giuseppe Calì – Death of Dragut (Museum of Fine Arts, Valletta)
- Julia Margaret Cameron – photographs
  - Carlyle Like a Rough Block of Michael Angelo's Sculpture
  - Profiles of Julie Jackson (her niece)
- Frederic Edwin Church – Niagara Falls, from the American Side
- Edward William Cooke – Canal of the Giudecca, Venice
- Gustave Courbet – The kill of deer
- Edgar Degas – The Bellelli Family completed (Musée d'Orsay, Paris)
- Gustave Doré – engraved illustrations to Dante's Il Purgatorio ed il Paradiso
- Jean-Léon Gérôme
  - Arnaut with two whippets
  - The Death of Caesar
  - Jerusalem, also known as Golgotha, Consumatum Est or The Crucifixion
  - Napoleon in Egypt
  - The runners of the Pasha
  - Western Wall
- Artur Grottger
  - Phryne
- Gustave Achille Guillaumet – The Sahara
- Solomon Hart – The Submission of the Emperor Barbarossa to Pope Alexander III
- Francesco Hayez
  - The Destruction of the Temple of Jerusalem
  - Odalisque
  - Odalisque in Her Sleep
- Frank Holl
  - Convalescent
  - Faces in the Fire
- Ivan Kramskoi – Self-portrait
- Edwin Landseer
  - Bronze lions for Nelson's Column
  - The Wild Cattle of Chillingham
- Charles-Auguste Lebourg – Games of Love (terracotta)
- Alphonse Legros – Cupid and Psyche
- Frederic Leighton – Venus Disrobing for the Bath
- Édouard Manet
  - View of the 1867 Exposition Universelle (Nationalgalleriet, Oslo)
  - ‘’Boy Blowing Bubbles’’
  - The Races at Longchamp
- John Everett Millais – Sleeping
- Claude Monet
  - Femme au jardin (Jeanne-Marguerite Lecadre in the Garden at Sainte-Adresse) (Hermitage Museum, Saint Petersburg)
  - Garden at Sainte-Adresse (Metropolitan Museum of Art, New York)
- Johannes Adam Simon Oertel – Rock of Ages
- Vasily Perov – The Drowned
- Henri Félix Emmanuel Philippoteaux – The Arrival of La Dorade at Courbevoie
- Edward Poynter – Israel in Egypt
- Val Prinsep
  - Lisa (from Boccaccio's 'Decameron')
  - Miriam Watching the Infant Moses
- Pierre-Auguste Renoir – Lise (with a Parasol)
- Alfred Sisley – Avenue of Chestnut Trees near La Celle-Saint-Cloud
- Simeon Solomon – Carrying the Scrolls of the Law
- Frederick Walker – Bathers
- James McNeill Whistler – Symphony in White, No. 3

== Births ==
- January 17 – Louise Upton Brumback, American landscape painter (died 1929)
- February 19 – Emília dos Santos Braga, Portuguese painter (died 1949)
- March 8 – William de Leftwich Dodge, American muralist (died 1935)
- March 10 – Leonard Raven-Hill, English illustrator (died 1942)
- March 25 – Gutzon Borglum, American artist and sculptor (died 1941)
- April 8 – Allen Butler Talcott, American painter (died 1908)
- April 10 – George William Russell, Irish critic, poet and painter (died 1935)
- May 12 - Frank Brangwyn, Welsh painter (died 1956)
- June 8
  - Dagny Juel, Norwegian muse (murdered 1901)
  - O'Galop (Marius Rossillon), French cartoonist (died 1946)
- July 5 – Max Jakob Friedländer, German-born curator and art historian (died 1958)
- July 8 – Käthe Kollwitz, German graphic artist and sculptor (died 1945)
- August 26 – Viktor Foerster, Czech painter and mosaic artist (died 1915)
- September 9 – Ernst Oppler, German painter (died 1929)
- September 14 – Charles Dana Gibson, American graphic artist (died 1944)
- September 16 – Eva Watson-Schütze, American portrait photographer (died 1935)
- September 19 – Arthur Rackham, English illustrator (died 1939)
- October 3 – Pierre Bonnard, French painter (died 1947)
- October 15 - Fujishima Takeji, Japanese painter (died 1943)
- November 4 - Henry Charles Fehr, British sculptor (died 1940)
- Undated
  - Florence Fuller, South African-born Australian painter (died 1946)
  - Pinckney Marcius-Simons, American painter (died 1909)

== Deaths ==
- January 4 – Marianne Ehrenström, Swedish writer, singer, painter, pianist, culture personality and memorialist (born 1773)
- January 14 – Jean-Auguste-Dominique Ingres, French Neoclassical painter (born 1780)
- February 10 – Carl Wagner, German Romantic landscape painter (born 1796)
- February 28 – Jacques Raymond Brascassat, French painter (born 1804)
- March – Kazimierz Jelski, Polish architect and sculptor (born 1782)
- March 3 – J. L. Lund, Danish painter especially of historical subjects (born 1777)
- March 6 – Peter von Cornelius, German painter (born 1784)
- April 15 – Adelaide Ironside, Australian painter (born 1831)
- May 18 – Clarkson Frederick Stanfield, English marine painter (born 1793)
- September 15 – Alexis Joseph Depaulis, French sculptor and medallist (born 1792)
- December 4 – Sophie Fremiet, French painter (born 1797)
- December 22 – Théodore Rousseau, French landscape painter (born 1812)
- December 27 – Antoine Claudet, French photographer and artist (born 1797)
- December 29 – Carlo Marochetti, Italian-born sculptor (born 1805)
- date unknown
  - Luo Bingzhang, Han Chinese official, military general, calligrapher and devout Confucian scholar (born 1793)
  - James Pollard, English painter and aquatint engraver especially of coach, fox hunting and equine scenes (born 1792)
