= Charles-Rémy-Jules François =

French engraver

Charles-Rémy-Jules François (24 December 1809, Paris - 1861) was a French engraver. His early productions were engravings of pictures by Anthony van Dyck and Raphael in the manner of his master Louis-Pierre Henriquel-Dupont. Later he was exclusively employed in reproducing the paintings of Paul Delaroche. He resided in Brussels from the beginning of 1858. His brother Alphonse François was also a distinguished engraver.
