= John Milton Visiting Galileo When a Prisoner of the Inquisition =

Painting by Solomon Hart

John Milton Visiting Galileo when a Prisoner of the Inquisition
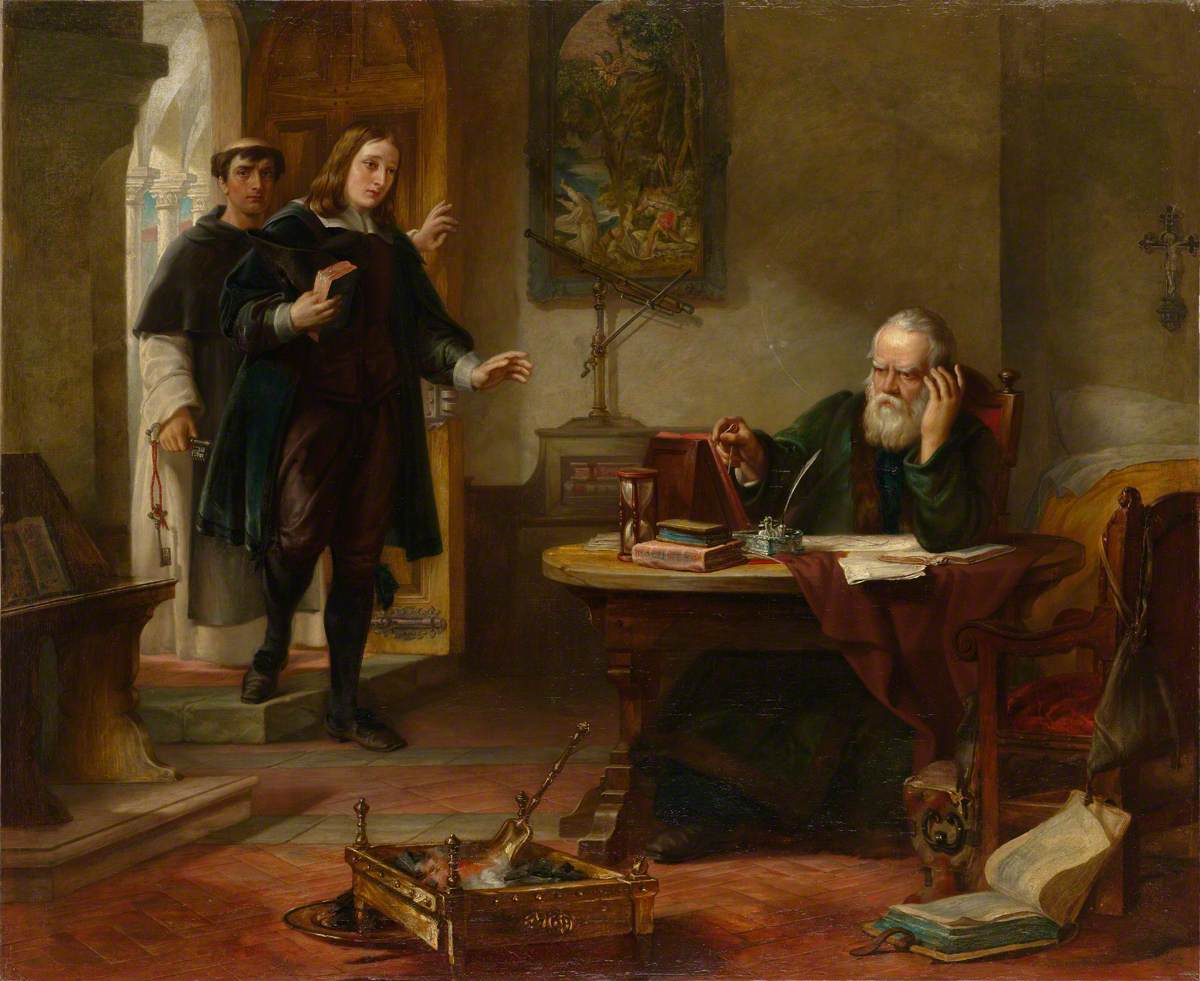
- Artist: Solomon Hart
- Year: 1847
- Type: Oil on canvas, history painting
- Dimensions: 118 cm × 146 cm (46 in × 57 in)
- Location: Wellcome Collection, London

John Milton Visiting Galileo when a Prisoner of the Inquisition is an oil on canvas history painting by the British artist Solomon Hart, frm 1847.

== History and description ==
It is inspired by the real-life meeting between the English writer John Milton and the Italian scientist Galileo Galilei. It took place in 1638 when the young Milton visited him while he was placed under house arrest in Arcetri by the Roman Inquisition. This followed the Galileo affair in which he had argued that the Earth orbited the Sun. On the wall behind him is a version of Titian's The Assassination of Saint Peter Martyr, a work filled with symbolism given Galileo's current situation.

Hart produced several paintings focusing on great figures from history around this time. The painting was displayed at the Royal Academy Exhibition of 1847 held at the National Gallery in London. On varnishing day the veteran J.M.W. Turner passed the painting and instinctively added the Solar System on the wall behind Galileo with chalk and was about to remove it, but Clarkson Stanfield persuaded Hart to retain it and make it permanent with paint which Hart later said "all thought that Turner's suggestion had much improved my picture". Today the picture is in the Wellcome Collection which acquired it in 1929.

An engraving was produced based on the painting by William James Linton which appeared in the London Illustrated News and elsewhere.

== Bibliography ==
- Bailey, Anthony. J.M.W. Turner: Standing in the Sun. Tate Enterprises Ltd, 2013.
- Morris, Michael Thomas. Cowled Creatures: The Image of the Monk in Georgian and Victorian England. University of California Press, 1986.
- Shires, Linda M. (ed.) Rewriting the Victorians: Theory, History, and the Politics of Gender. Routledge, 2012.
