= Auguste III Blanchard =

French engraver

Auguste Blanchard
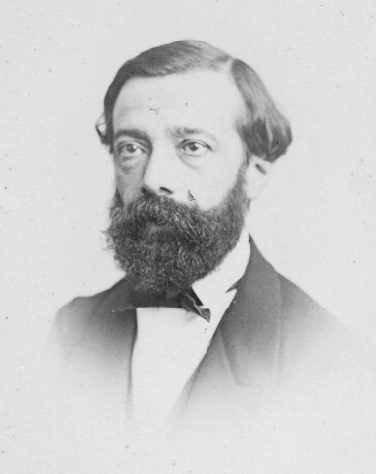
- Auguste Blanchard; by Charles Reutlinger (1860s)
- Born: Auguste III Thomas Marie Blanchard; May 18, 1819; Paris, France
- Died: May 23, 1898 (aged 79); Paris, France
- Education: École des Beaux-Arts
- Known for: "The Chess Players" (1873) "The Parting Kiss" (1884)
- Movement: Intaglio

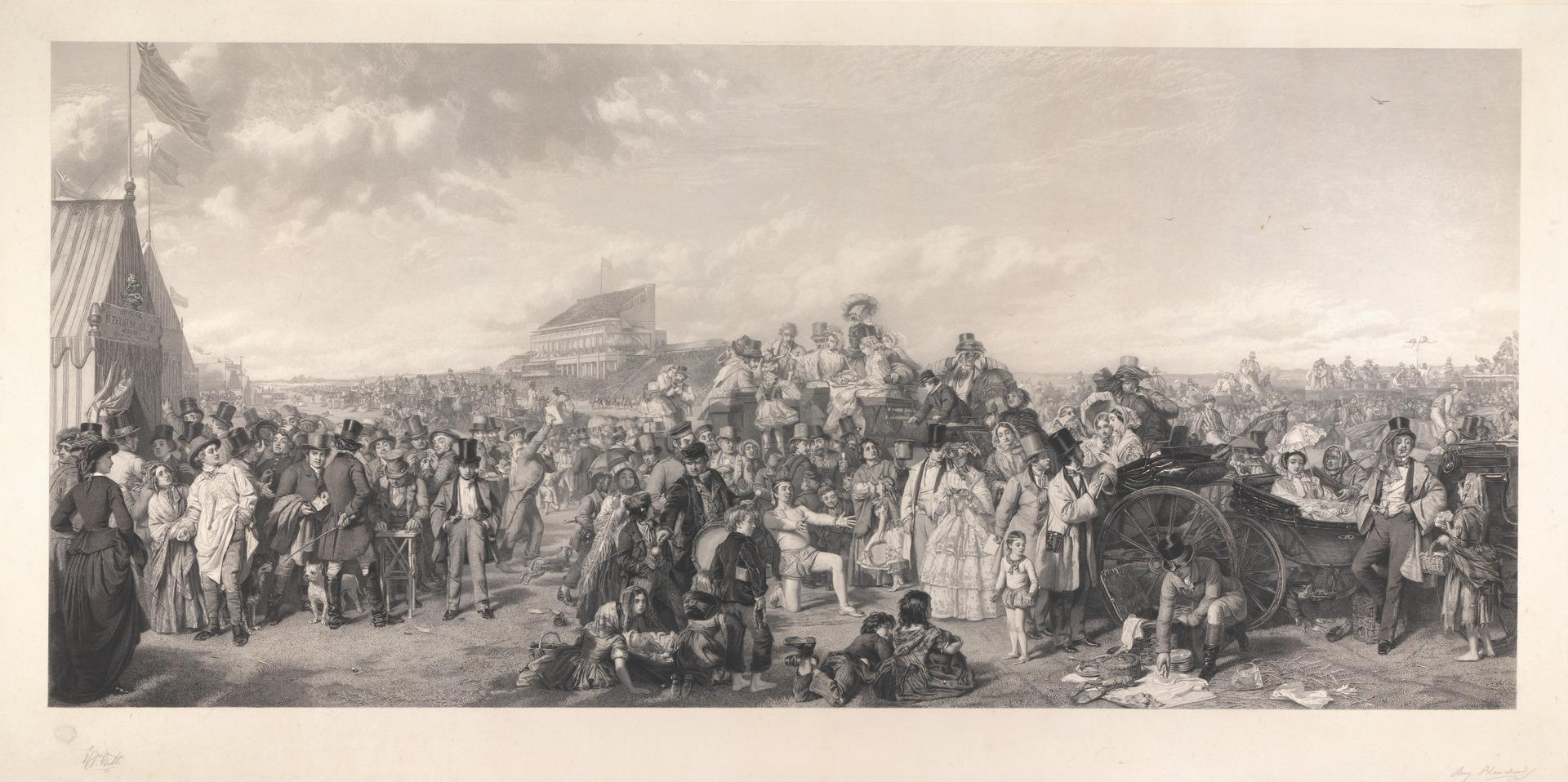
Derby Day, after William Powell Frith (1858, De Young Museum)

Auguste III Thomas Marie Blanchard (18 May 1819 in Paris – 23 May 1898 in Paris) was a French engraver.

== Life and work ==
His maternal grandfather, Nicolas-Guy-Antoine Brenet, was a medallist, and his paternal grandfather, Auguste I Blanchard, was an engraver; as was his father, Auguste II Blanchard, who gave him his first lessons.

He entered the École des Beaux-Arts in 1836. Two years later, he came in second at the Prix de Rome, and went to study in Italy. He made his début at the Paris in 1840, with an engraving of Spartacus, after a painting by Domenichino.

His first major work was a portrait of Jean-Nicolas Huyot, after the one by Michel Martin Drolling. It was sponsored by two major publishers; Adolphe Goupil in Paris and Ernest Gambart in London.

Overall, his specialty was Intaglio. His best known works include "The Chess Players" (1873), after Ernest Meissonier, and "The Parting Kiss" (1884), after Lawrence Alma-Tadema. He also illustrated a song collection by Frédéric Bérat (L. Curmer, 1854).

In 1888, he was elected to the Académie des Beaux-Arts, where he took Seat #1 for engraving, succeeding Alphonse François (deceased). Outside of Europe, his original works may be seen at the De Young Museum in San Francisco.

His eldest son, Édouard-Théophile, was a painter. His youngest son, Ernest-Pascal, was a painter and stained glass artist.

== Sources ==
- Benezit Dictionary of Artists, 2006 ISBN 978-0-19-977378-7
- Athena S. E. Leoussi, Grove Art Online, 1996 ISBN 978-1-884446-05-4
- Rodney Engen, Dictionary of Victorian Engravers, Print Publishers and Their Works, Somerset House ISBN 978-0-914146-86-5
