= The Duel After the Masquerade =

Painting by Jean-Léon Gérôme

The Duel After the Masquerade (Suite d'un bal masqué)
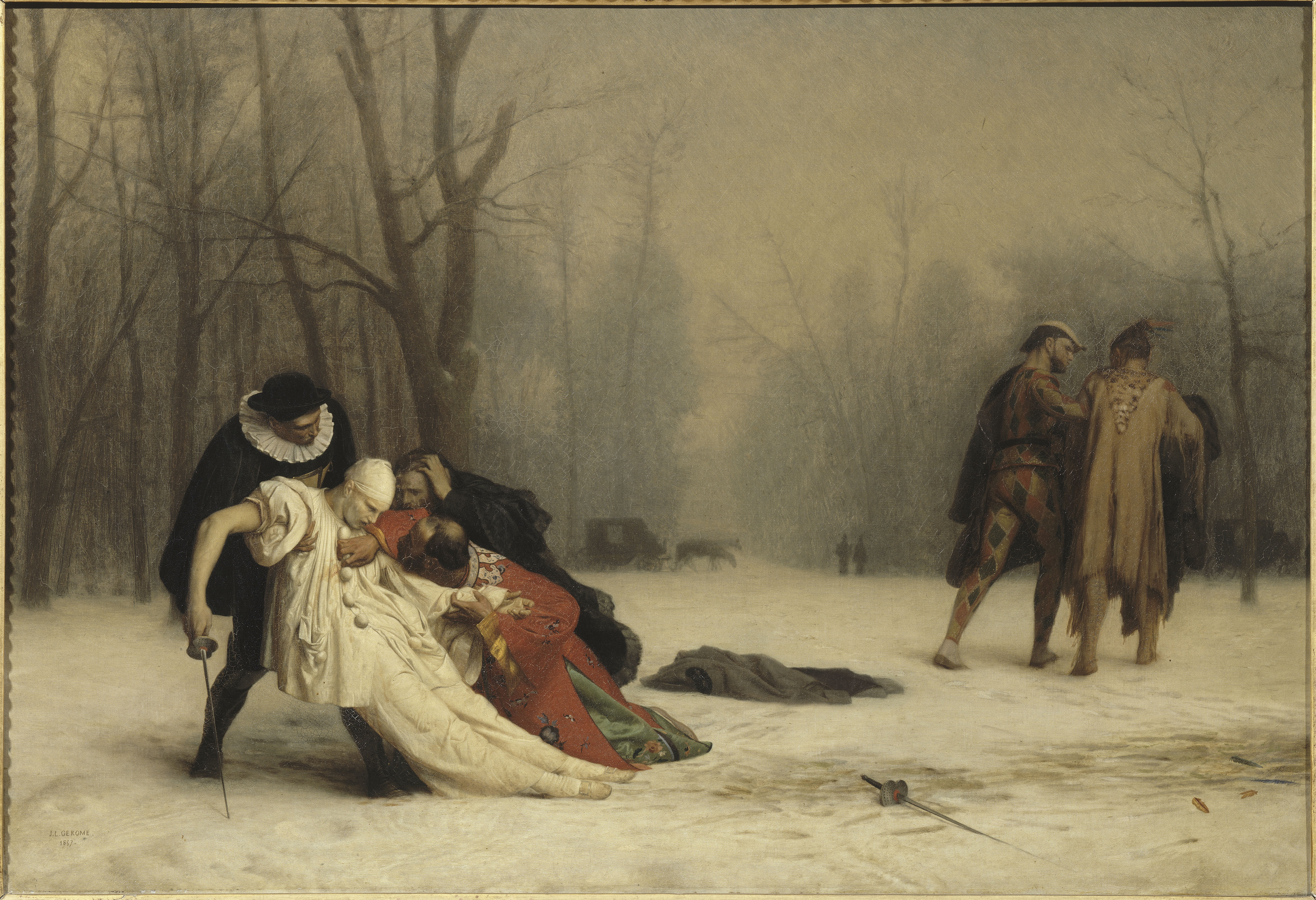
- Artist: Jean-Léon Gérôme
- Year: 1857
- Medium: Oil on canvas
- Dimensions: 39.1 cm × 56.3 cm (15.4 in × 22.2 in)
- Location: Musée Condé; Chantilly

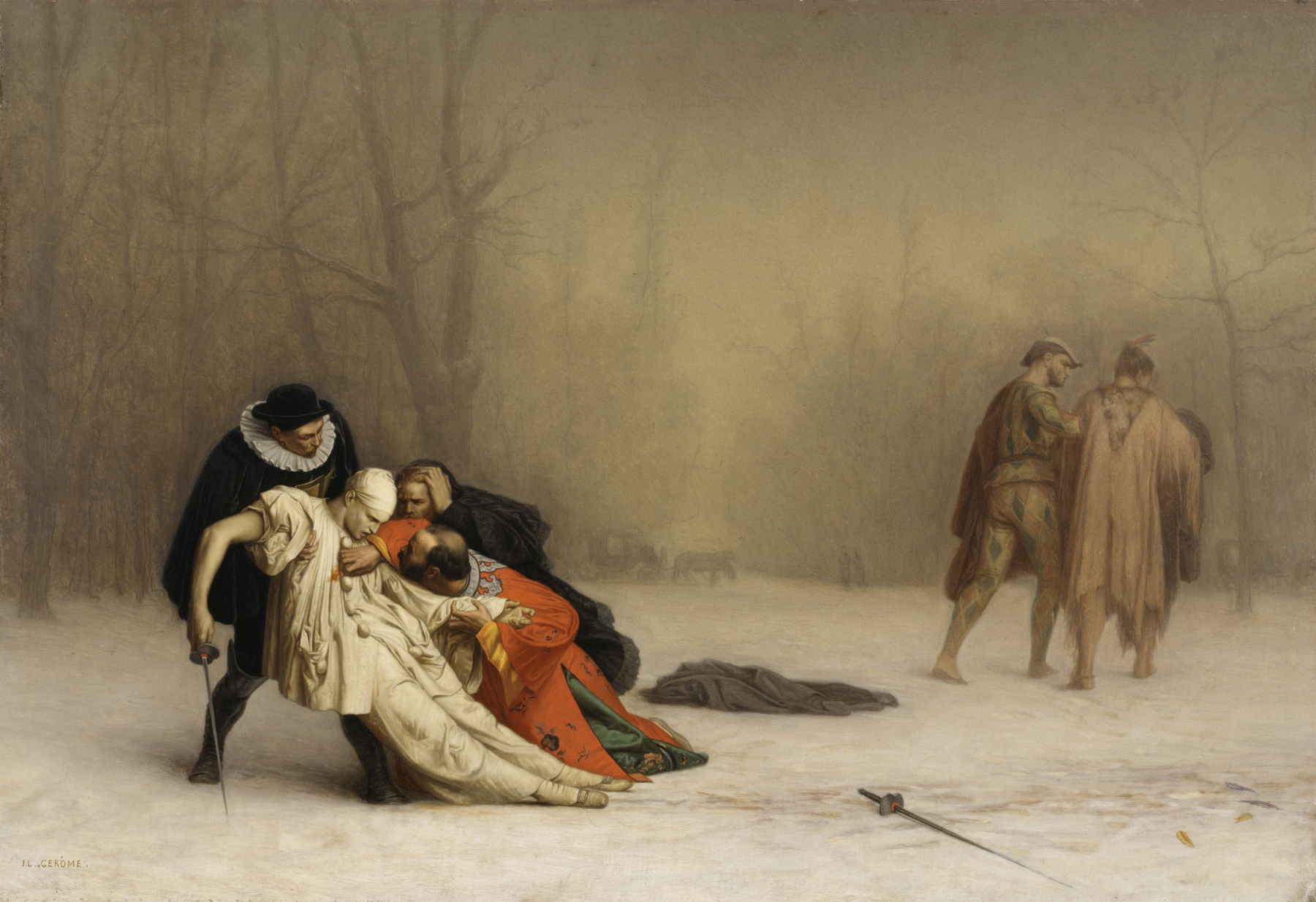
Replica in the Walters Art Museum

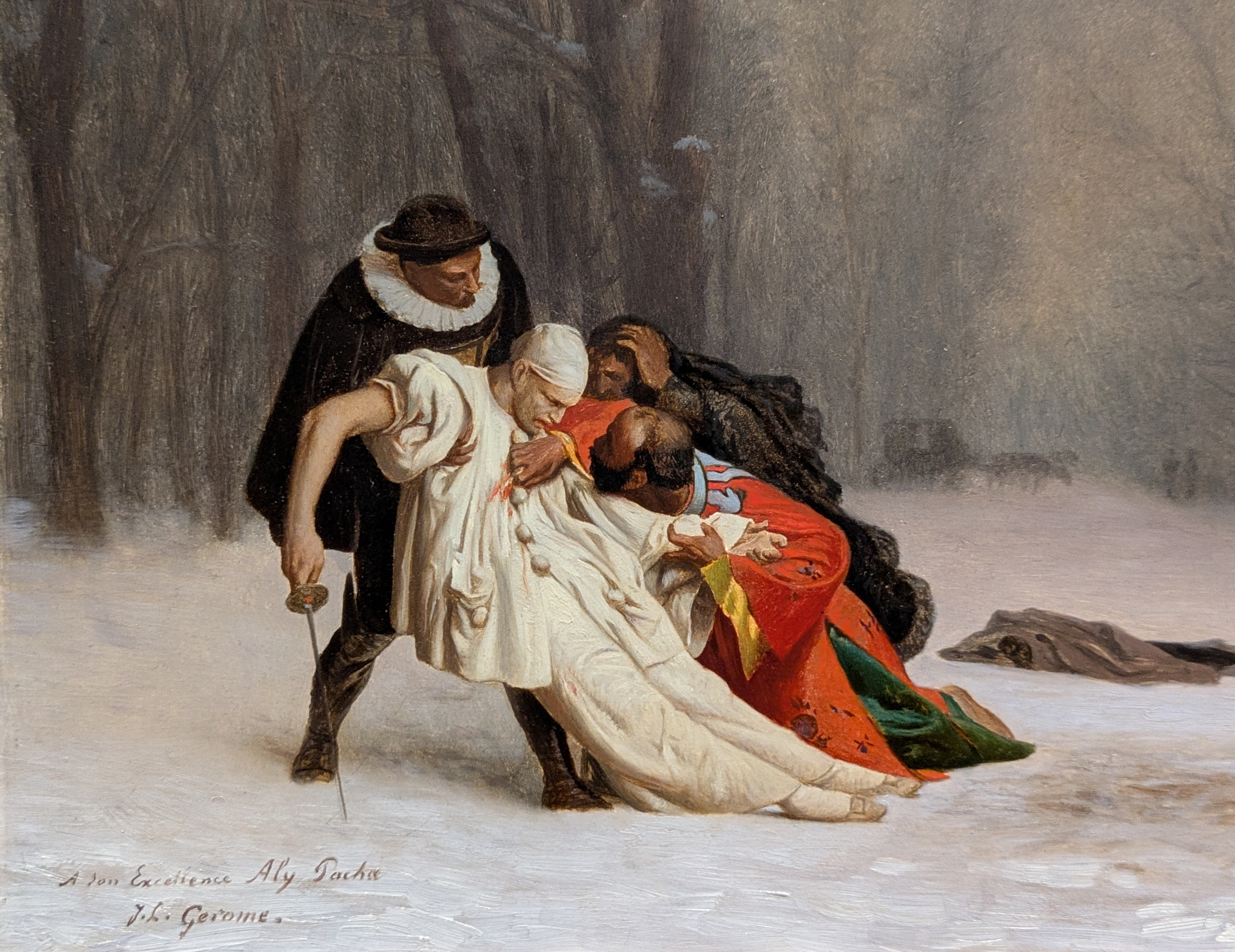
Detail of the replica painted for Ali Pasha (private collection, Chicago), inscribed "A son Excellence Aly Pacha"

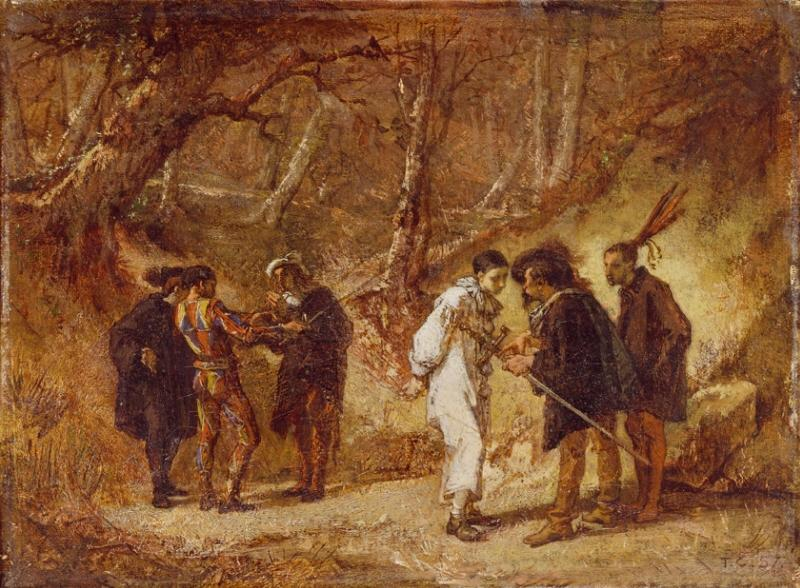
Le Duel après le bal masqué by Thomas Couture, 1857, Wallace Collection

The Duel After the Masquerade is a painting by the French artist Jean-Léon Gérôme, of which multiple copies exist. The original, Suite d'un bal masqué, first shown in 1857, is in the Musée Condé in Chantilly, France.

== History ==
Gérôme exhibited Suite d'un bal masqué at the Paris Salon of 1857, then in London the same year with the English merchant Gambart. The painting became famous almost overnight with critics of the Salon speculating about Gerome's sources for the incident depicted in the painting. (The theme seems to have been in fashion; Thomas Couture dealt with the same subject in 1857 with Le Duel après le bal masqué, now in the Wallace Collection). The painting was acquired in 1858 by the duc d'Aumale. Gérôme borrowed the painting to present it at the Universal Exhibition of 1867, and received the Grand Prix de Peinture. The original is part of the collection of the Musée Condé in Chantilly, France.

In 1859, William Thompson Walters purchased The Duel After the Masquerade at the National Academy of Design in New York for $2,500. The painting is a replica by Gérôme of his 1857 work Suite d'un bal masqué. It was not unusual for artists to replicate their own paintings; Gérôme also painted versions for Prince Alexander of Russia (now in the Hermitage Museum) and for the Ali Pacha. Walters asked the manager of the exhibition at the National Academy of Design for a letter of authentication from Gérôme and a comparison of his copy to the original.

In a poll taken in the winter of 1909–1910, Baltimoreans were asked to identify their fifty-five favorite works of art, and The Duel After the Masquerade topped the list.

== Composition ==
The scene is set on a gray winter morning in the Bois de Boulogne, trees bare and snow covering the ground. A man dressed as a Pierrot has been mortally wounded in a duel and has collapsed into the arms of a Duc de Guise. A surgeon, dressed as a doge of Venice, tries to stop the flow of blood, while a Domino clutches his own head.

The survivor of the duel, dressed as an American Indian, walks away with his second, Harlequin, leaving behind his weapon and some feathers of his headdress, towards his carriage, shown waiting in the background.

It was characteristic of Gérôme to depict not a violent event itself, but the aftermath of such violence; see The Death of Caesar, The Execution of Marshal Ney, and Jerusalem. The bizarreness of the scene in regard to the brightly colored costumes turns to pathos at the sight of blood on the Pierrot.

== Exhibition history ==
The Walters indicates that the work has been included in the following exhibitions:

- From Ingres to Gauguin: French Nineteenth Century Paintings Owned in Maryland. Baltimore Museum of Art, Baltimore. 1951.
- The Taste of Maryland: Art Collecting in Maryland 1800–1934. The Walters Art Gallery, Baltimore. 1984.
- Highlights from the Collection. The Walters Art Gallery, Baltimore. 1998–2001.
- Triumph of French Painting: Masterpieces from Ingres to Matisse. Baltimore Museum of Art, Baltimore; Philbrook Museum of Art, Tulsa; Norton Museum of Art, West Palm Beach; Royal Academy of Arts, London; Albright-Knox Art Gallery, Buffalo; Dayton Art Institute, Dayton. 2000–2002.
- A Magnificent Age: Masterpieces from the Walters Art Museum, Baltimore. The Nelson-Atkins Museum of Art, Kansas City; Mint Museum of Art, Charlotte; The Walters Art Museum, Baltimore. 2002–2004.
- Déjà Vu? Revealing Repetition in French Masterpieces. The Walters Art Museum, Baltimore; Phoenix Art Museum, Phoenix. 2007–2008.
- The Spectacular Art of Jean-Léon Gérôme. J. Paul Getty Museum, Los Angeles; Musee D'Orsay, Paris; Museo Thyssen-Bornemisza, Madrid. 2010–2011.
- From Rye to Raphael: The Walters Story. The Walters Art Museum, Baltimore. 2014–2016.
