= The Execution of Marshal Ney =

1868 painting by Jean-Léon Gérôme

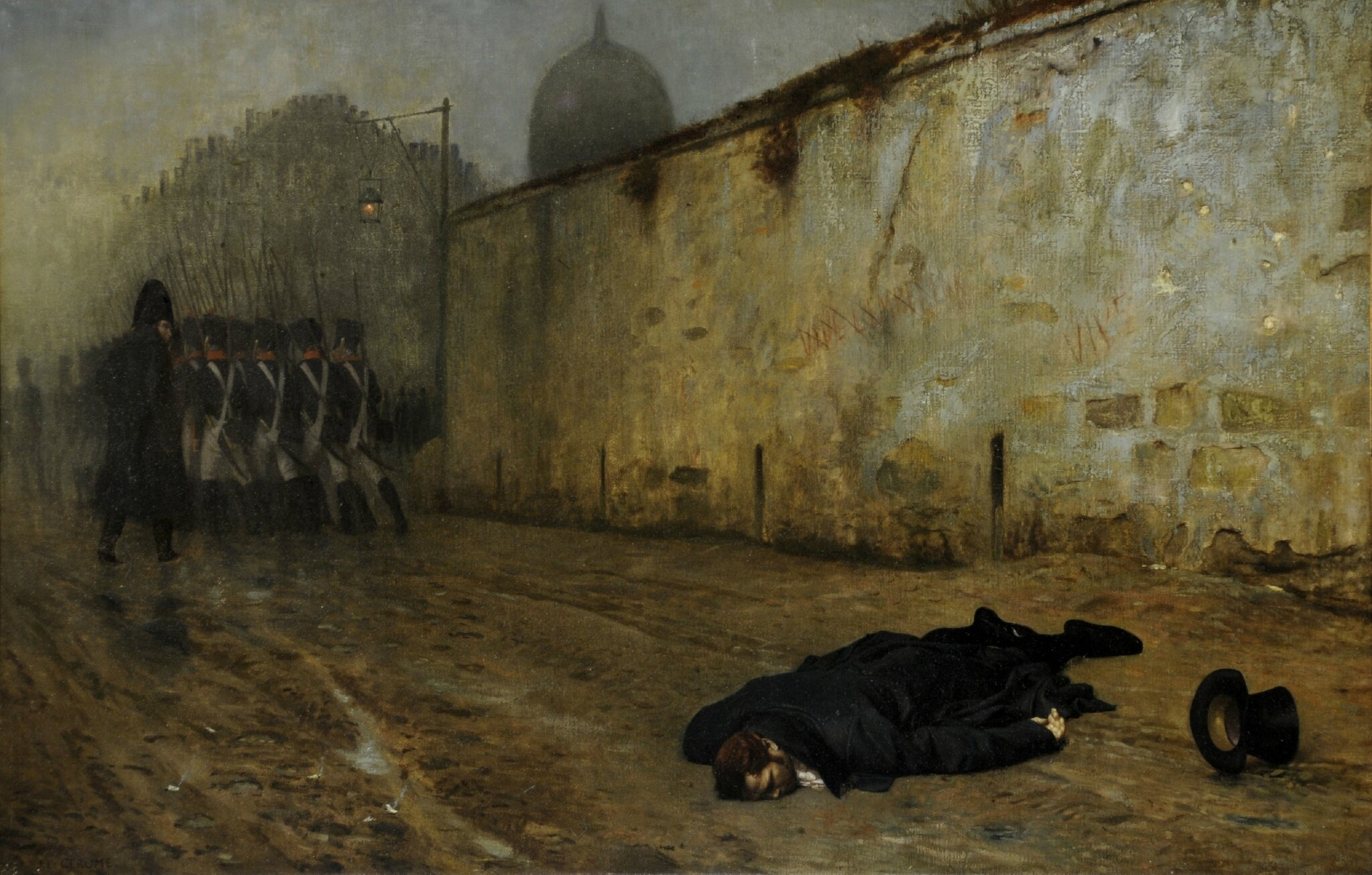
- Artist: Jean-Léon Gérôme
- Year: 1868
- Medium: Oil on canvas
- Dimensions: 65.2 cm × 104.2 cm (25.7 in × 41.0 in)
- Location: Graves Art Gallery, Sheffield

The Execution of Marshal Ney (French: L'exécution du maréchal Ney) is an 1868 painting by the French artist Jean-Léon Gérôme. It depicts the French Marshal Michel Ney immediately after his execution on 7 December 1815, with the firing squad seen marching away from the site. On the wall behind Ney's corpse are two inscriptions: one that says "vive l'empereur" ("long live the emperor") and is crossed out, and one that says "vive" right before the bullet holes from the execution. According to Gérôme this was a comment on Ney's multiple shifts of allegiance between Napoleon and the House of Bourbon.

The painting has been owned by the Sheffield Galleries and Museums Trust since 1931, and is now in the collection of the Graves Art Gallery in Sheffield, England.

== Historical background ==
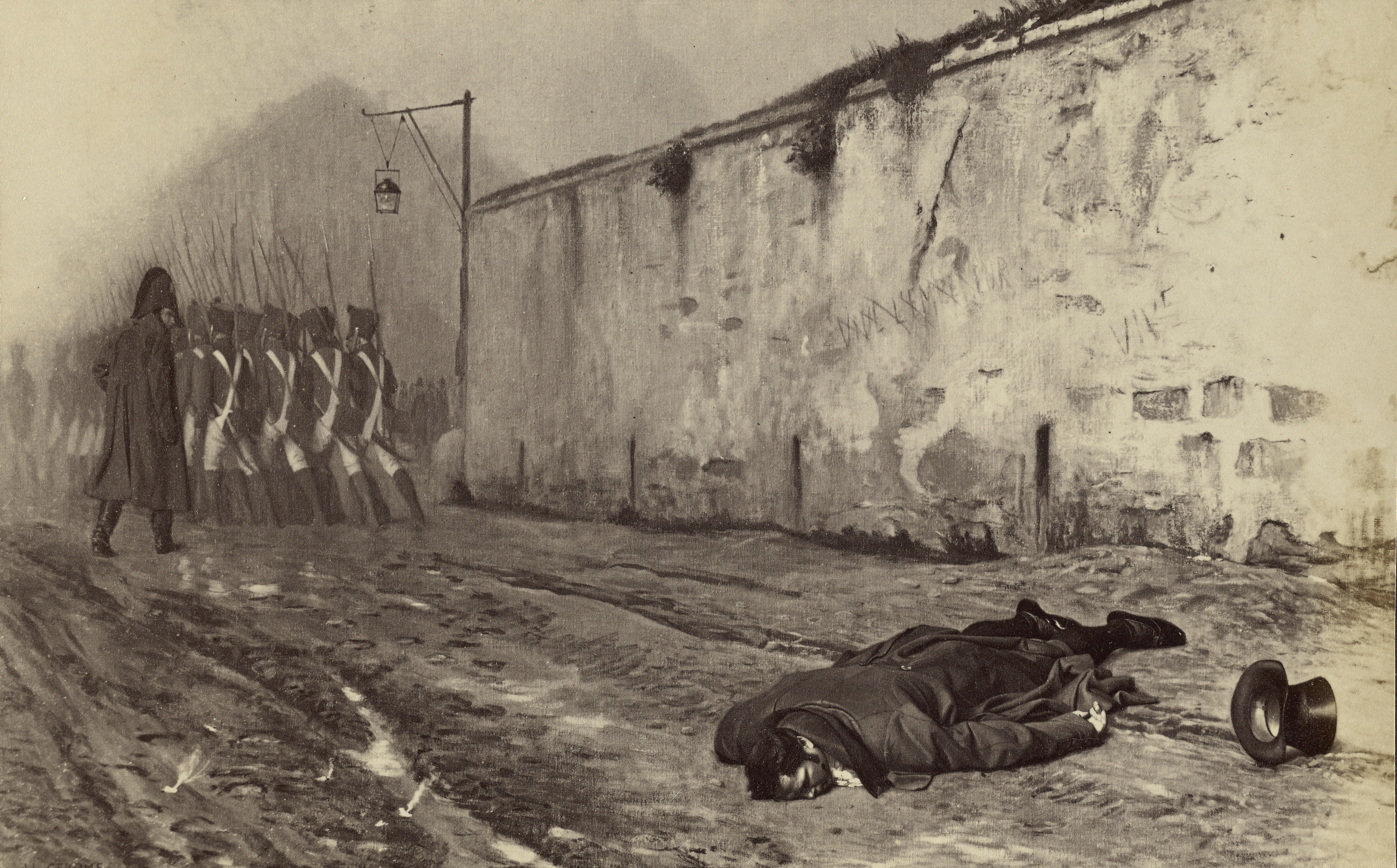
Some details of the work may be more legible in this albumen silver print.

Michel Ney was a marshal in Napoleon’s army, a heroic figure called "the bravest of the brave" by Napoleon. When Napoleon abdicated in 1814, Ney pledged his allegiance to the Bourbon monarchy, but when Napoleon returned to France, Ney rejoined his former leader. When the monarchy was restored in 1815, Marshal Ney was accused of plotting Napoleon’s return and charged with treason. At his execution he refused to wear a blindfold and was allowed to give the order to fire.

== Reception ==
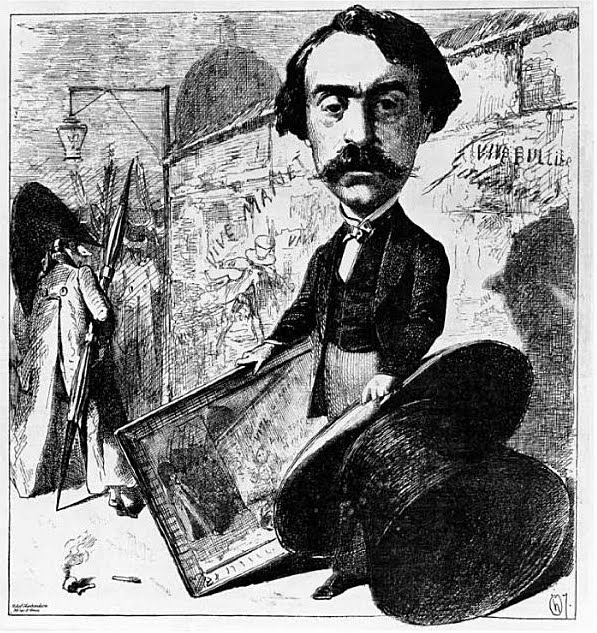
Caricature of Gerome by Henri Oulevay, commenting on the controversy roused by The Execution of Marshal Ney.

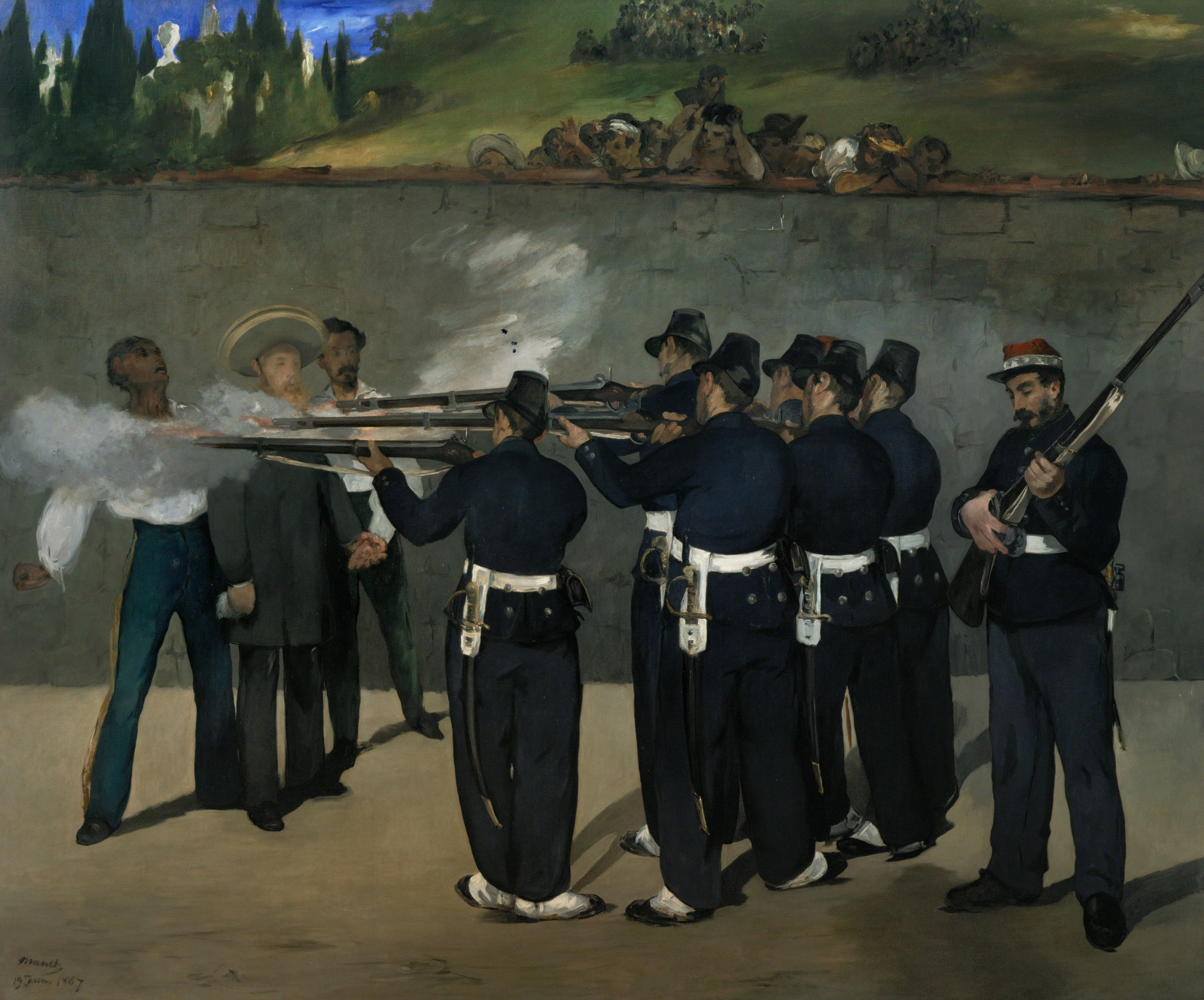
Édouard Manet, The Execution of Maximilian, 1868, Kunsthalle Mannheim.

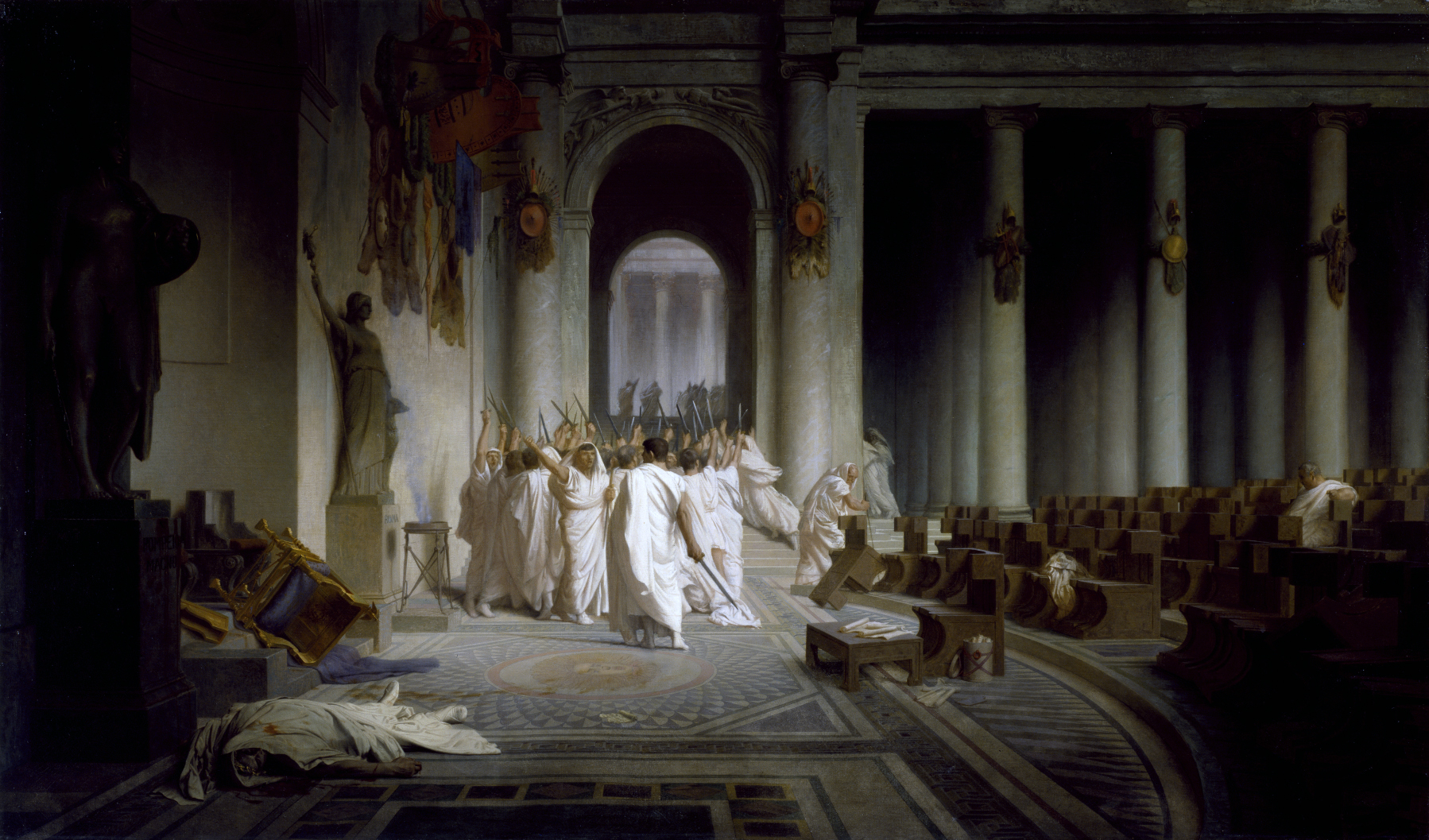
Gérôme's The Death of Caesar, 1867, Walters Art Museum, Baltimore.

The painting was presented at the Paris Salon of 1868. Although Ney's execution was over fifty years in the past, a depiction of the incident still roused emotions and created controversy. On behalf of Ney's descendants, Gérôme was asked to withdraw the painting, but he did not comply.

The general reception was very split and the 1868 Salon marked the beginning of a lasting divide between Gérôme and many French art critics. Those who were negative accused the painting of relying on literary techniques, of commercializing art, and of bringing politics into art. Théophile Gautier wrote a positive review highlighting details that give the picture meaning, Gérôme's treatment of the death theme, and the success of the painting at capturing a mental climate.

Henri Oulevay made a caricature where Gérôme is depicted in front of the wall with art critics as the departing firing squad, carrying pens and quills instead of rifles. "Vive Manet" is scrawled on the wall, a reference to The Execution of Emperor Maximilian series of paintings made by Édouard Manet that graphically depicted the execution by firing squad of Emperor Maximilian I of Mexico in 1867.

The previous year, Gérôme had exhibited The Death of Caesar, which has structural and thematic similarities to The Execution of Marshal Ney, with the corpse in the foreground and the killers departing with their backs to the viewer. In that painting, too, (as also in The Duel After the Masquerade and Jerusalem), "characteristically, Gérôme…depicted not the incident itself, but its immediate aftermath."
