= Jerusalem (painting) =

1867 painting by Jean-Léon Gérôme

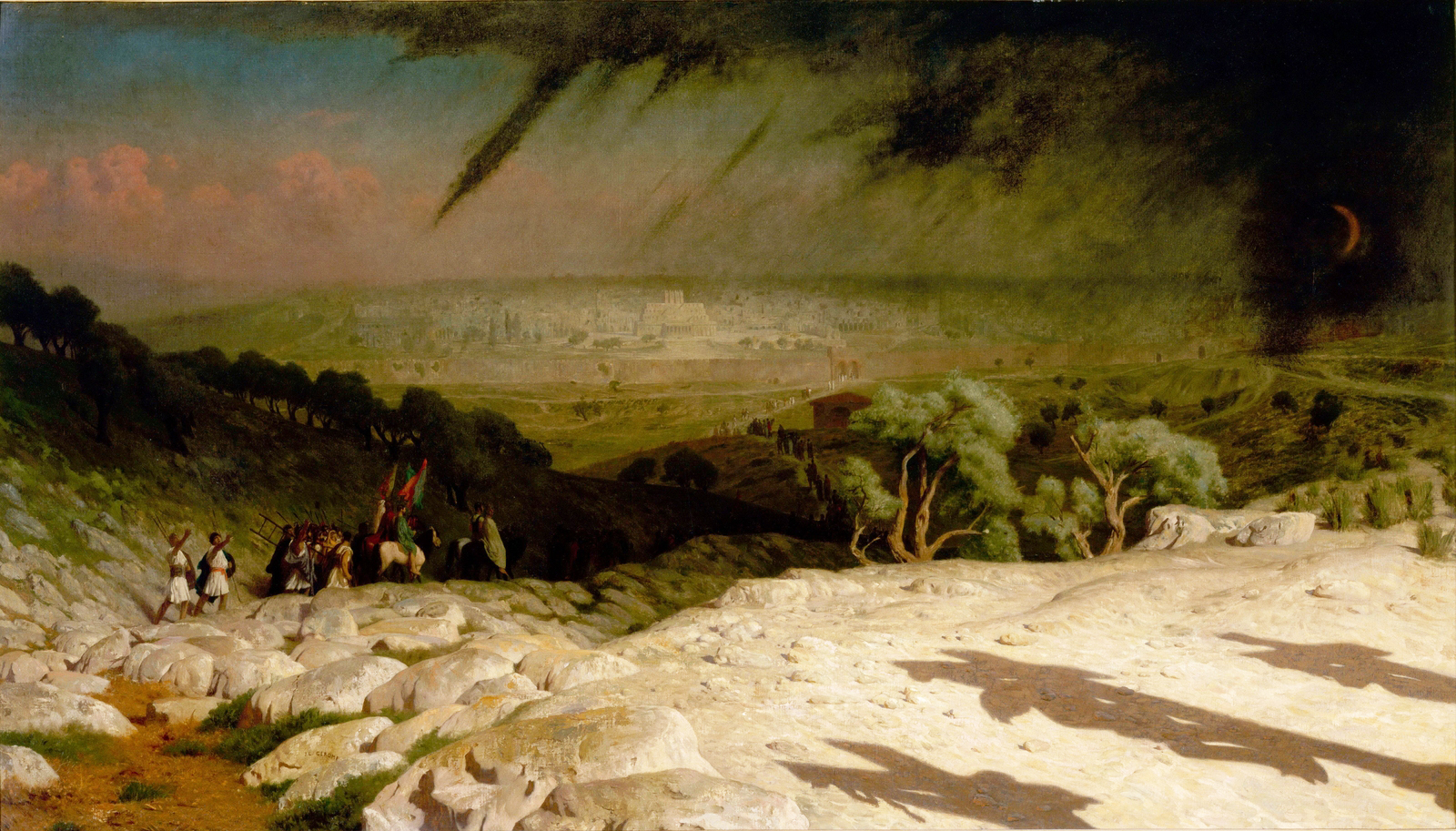
- Artist: Jean-Léon Gérôme
- Year: 1867
- Medium: Oil on canvas
- Dimensions: 82 cm × 144.5 cm (32 in × 56.9 in)
- Location: Musée d'Orsay, Paris

Jerusalem (French: Jérusalem) is an 1867 painting by the French artist Jean-Léon Gérôme. It is also known as Golgotha, Consumatum Est and The Crucifixion (La Crucifixion). The foreground depicts the ground of Golgotha with the shadows of three crucified men: Jesus and the two thieves. Further back in the picture is a crowd of people moving away from the scene. In the background is the city of Jerusalem under a cloudy sky.

It was characteristic of Gérôme to depict not a violent event itself, but the aftermath of such violence; see The Death of Caesar, The Execution of Marshal Ney, and The Duel After the Masquerade.

The painting marked Gérôme's return to history painting after a period of exploring orientalism. Like much Christian art of the era, the depiction was influenced by Ernest Renan's Life of Jesus.

The painting was presented at the Salon of 1868 in Paris and then again at the Royal Academy Exhibition of 1870 at Burlington House in London. Since 1990 it is located at the Musée d'Orsay in Paris.
