= Odalisque in Her Sleep =

Painting by Francesco Hayez

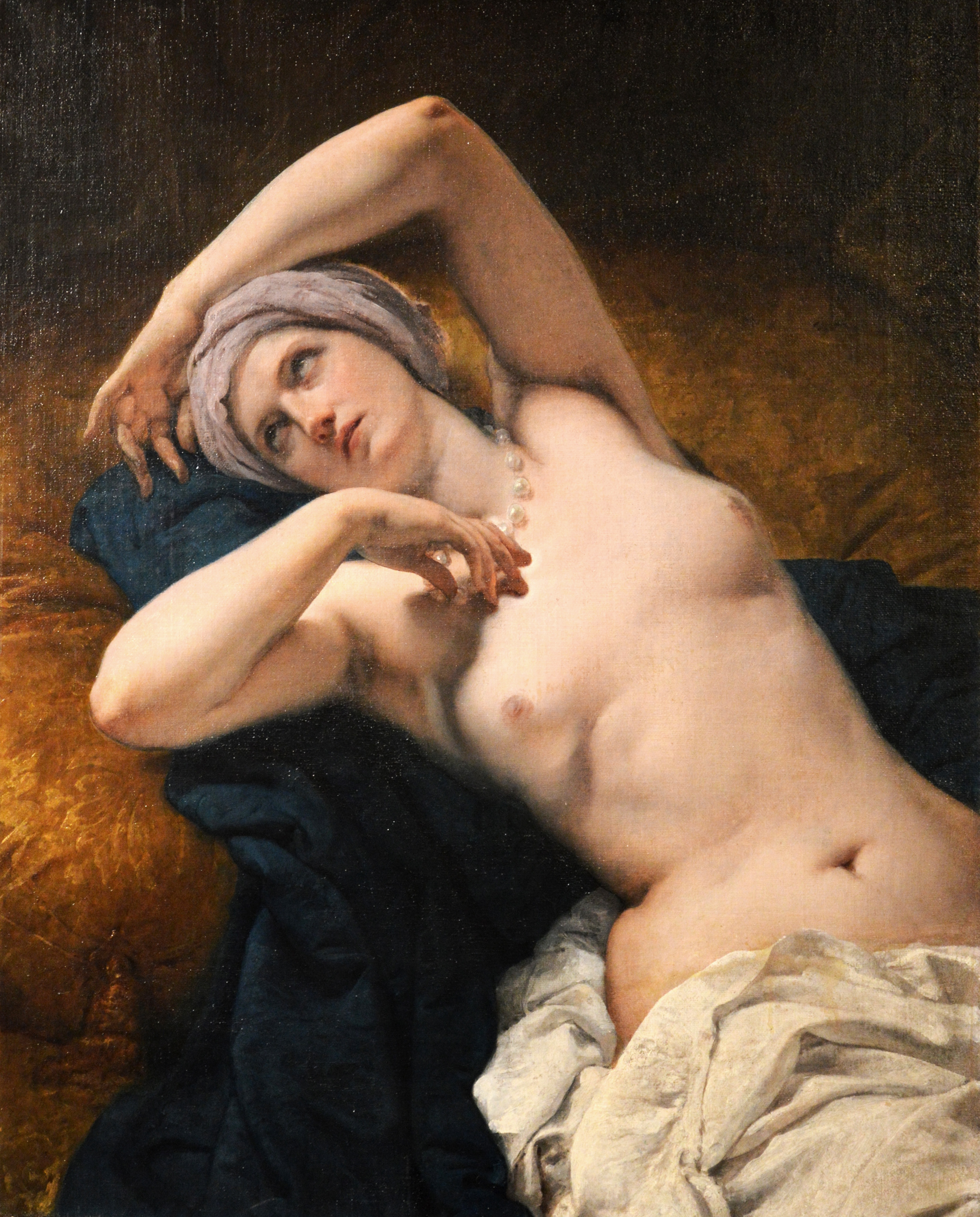
- Artist: Francesco Hayez
- Year: 1867
- Type: Oil on canvas, nude art
- Dimensions: 93 cm × 75 cm (37 in × 30 in)
- Location: Brera Academy; Milan

Odalisque in Her Sleep (Italian: Odalisca nel sonno) is an 1867 oil painting by the Italian artist Francesco Hayez. It depicts a turbanned Odalisque asleep. Hayez painted nudes throughout his career, often combining with them biblical themes. Oldalisques, chambermaids in Ottoman seraglios, were a popular subject in nineteenth century art. The depiction of the woman reflects the conventional academic style of the time. The picture was displayed at the 1867 exhibition at the Brera Academy in Milan. It remains in the collection of the Brera today.

== Bibliography ==
- Castellaneta, Carlo & Coradeschi, Sergio. L'opera completa di Hayez. Rizzoli, 1971.
- Mazzocca, Fernando. Hayez privato: arte e passioni nella Milano romantica. U. Allemandi, 1997
