= Solomon Hart =

English painter (1806–1881)

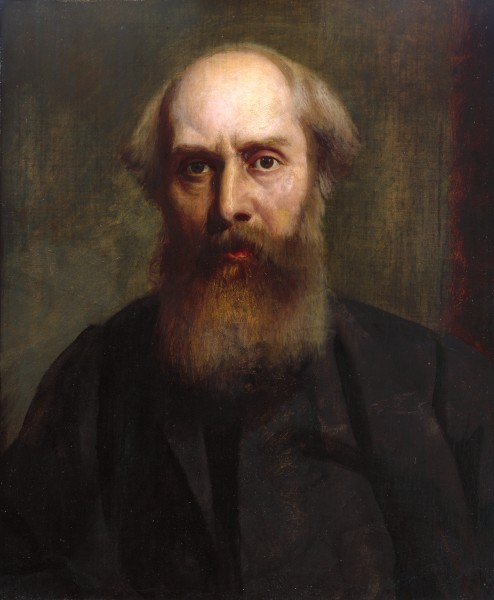
- Self-portrait of Solomon Hart, c. 1860
- Born: Solomon Alexander Hart; 1806; Plymouth, England
- Died: 1881 (aged 74–75); London, England
- Education: Royal Academy of Arts
- Known for: Painting, drawing, engraving

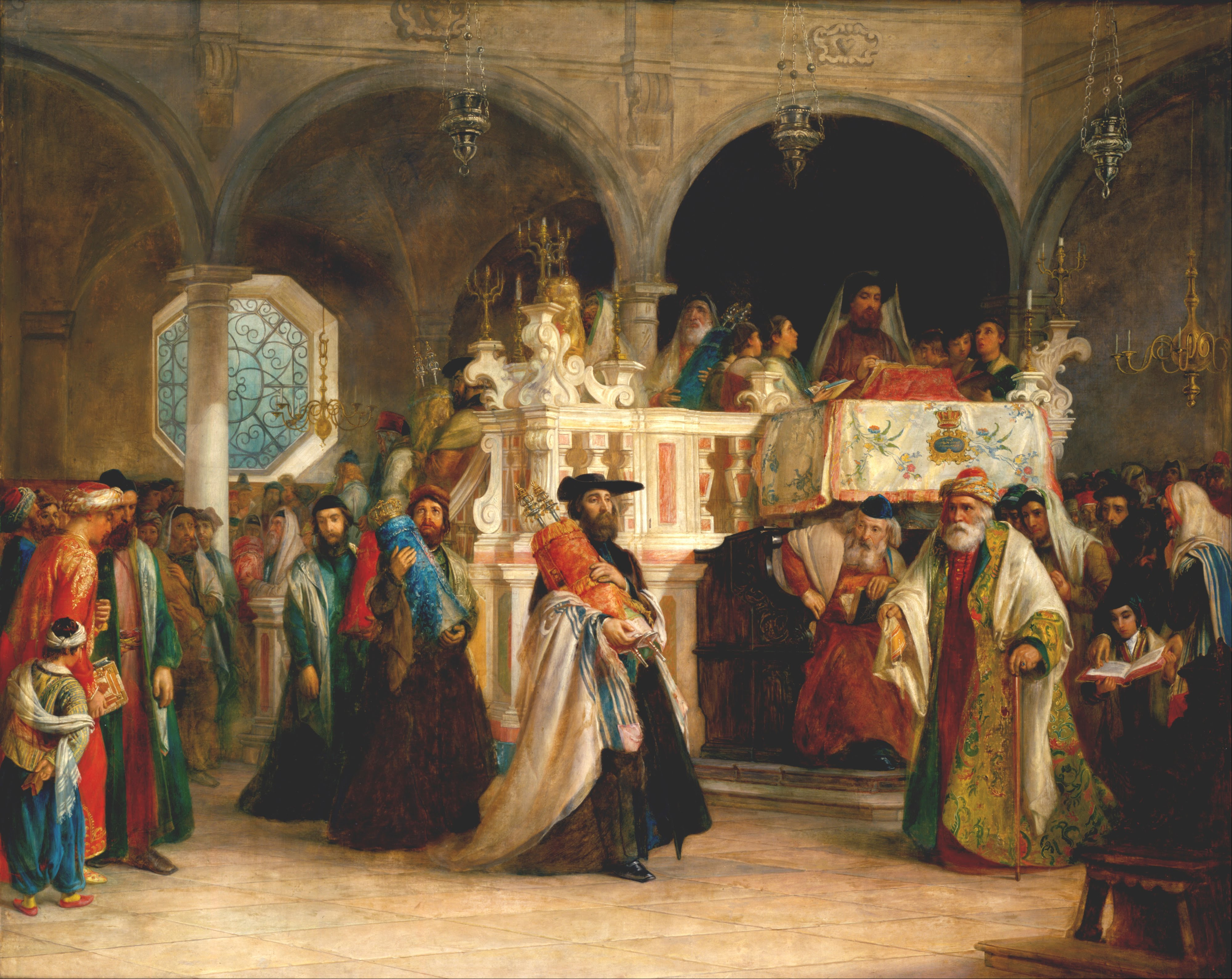
Simchat Torah at the Synagogue of Livorno

Solomon Alexander Hart RA (April 1806 – 11 June 1881) was a British painter and engraver. He was the first Jewish member of the Royal Academy in London and was probably the most important Jewish artist working in England in the 19th century.

== Early life and education ==
He was born in Plymouth, the son of Samuel Hart (fl. 1785–1830), a Jewish engraver and teacher of Hebrew. After completing his basic education, he was apprenticed to another local engraver. Later, he became the first Jew to enroll at the Royal Academy. While there, he worked in a variety of styles from genre to historical scenes and practiced several engraving and sketching techniques. He specifically excelled in miniatures.

== Career ==
In 1826, he débuted at one of the Academy's exhibitions with a portrait of his father. By 1840, he was successful enough to be accepted as a member of the Academy. The following year, he embarked on a study trip to Italy and spent a great deal of time in Florence. In 1854, he was appointed a Professor at the Academy and RA Librarian from 1864 to 1881.

Although his early works were largely Jewish-themed, his exposure to Italian art (especially the works of Domenico Ghirlandaio in the Ognissanti) added motifs from church and monastery paintings. He also regularly provided illustrations for periodicals such as The Athenaeum and The Jewish Chronicle.

== Later life ==
He never married and, in his later years, gradually lost his eyesight, although he continued to paint up until total loss of his eyesight.

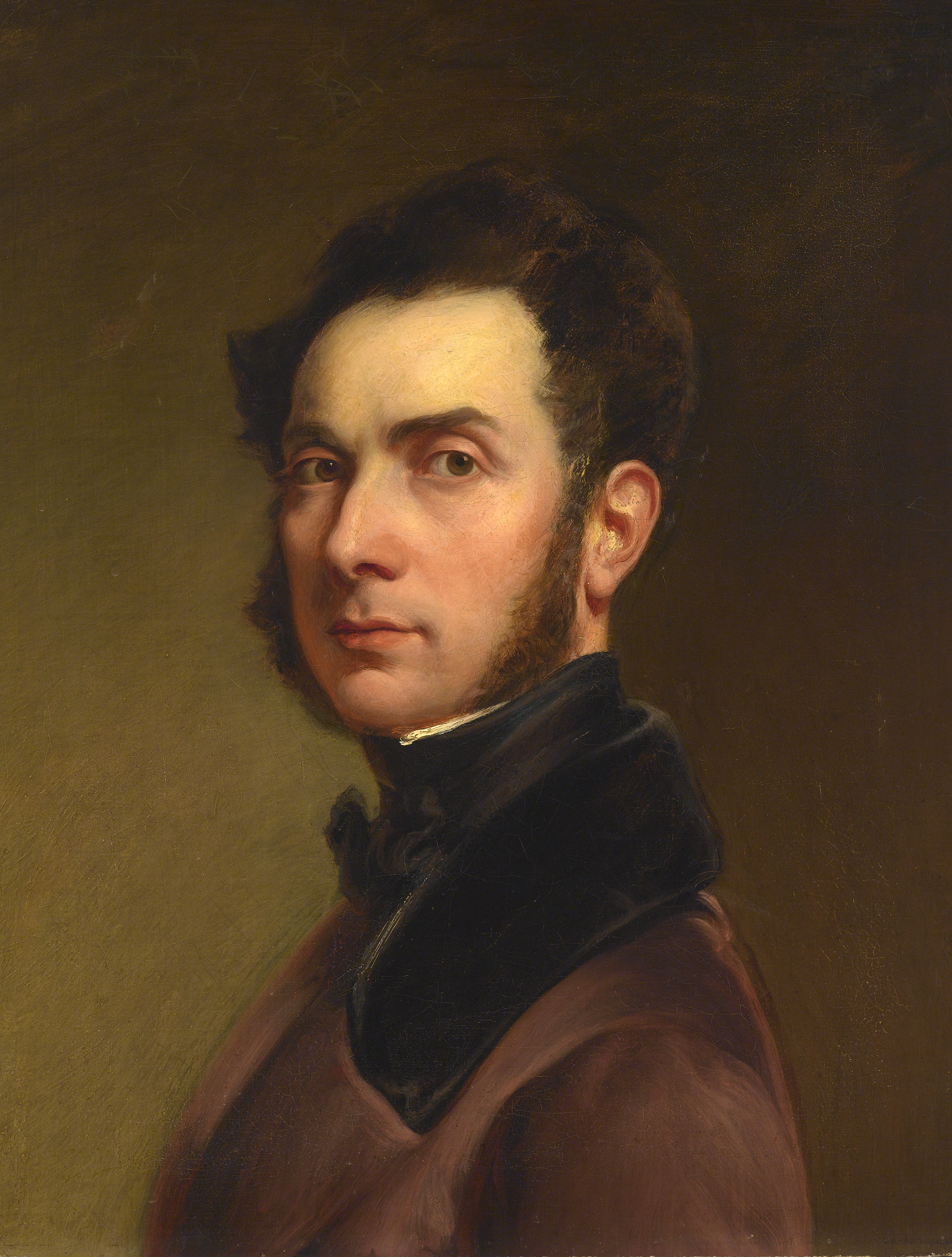
Self portrait, 1830-1840.

== Works ==
- The Proposal of the Jews to Ferdinand and Isabella (in order to secure their residence in Spain), 1870. (Sold for £137,542 on 8/3/2018 by Kestenbaum & Co, New York).
- 'Othello and Iago' (1855). Exhibited at the Royal Academy Exhibition 1855 and the London International Exhibition 1862. Both the oil and watercolour versions were exhibited at the London International Exhibition and the watercolour is now held at the Victoria & Albert Museum, London.(http://m.vam.ac.uk/collections/item/O1108399/othello-and-iago-watercolour-hart-solomon-alexander/)
- Temple of Jews at Shilo Hannah presenting infant to High Priest (1878) (sold on 16 March 1999 for £43,095 by Sotheby's New York)
- Flee Moham'mad Beg who accompanied horses presented by Ima'm of Muscat to King William IV (sold on 29 May 2000 for £29,000 by Eldreds Plymouth)
- [The Quarrel of] Wolsey and Buckingham (1834)
- Coeur de Lion and Saladin (1835)
- The Young Falconer (1835)
- Sir Thomas More receiving his Father's Blessing (1836)
- Lady Jane Grey at Her Place of Execution (1839)
- Henry I receiving News of the Shipwreck and Death of his Son (1840)
- John Milton Visiting Galileo When a Prisoner of the Inquisition (1847)
- The Feast of the Rejoicing of the Law at the Synagogue in Leghorn, Italy (1850)
- The Three Inventors of Printing (1852)
- Hop Picking (1852)
- Solomon pondering the Flight of Time (1853)
- Columbus (1854)
- Study for Othello & Iago (1855)
- Sacred Music (1860)
- Dilettanti (1861)
- Desdemona and Othello (1863)
- Benvenuto Cellini and Francis I (1864)
- The Eve of the Sabbath (1868)
- Portrait of Sir Moses Montefiore (1869)
- Oliver Cromwell and Menasseh Ben Israel (1873)
- Troy Weight (1874)
- A Reminiscene of Ravenna (1875)
- Dinner-Time at Penshurst in 1655 (1876)
- Reflection (1877)
- Perfidy (1878)

== Gallery ==
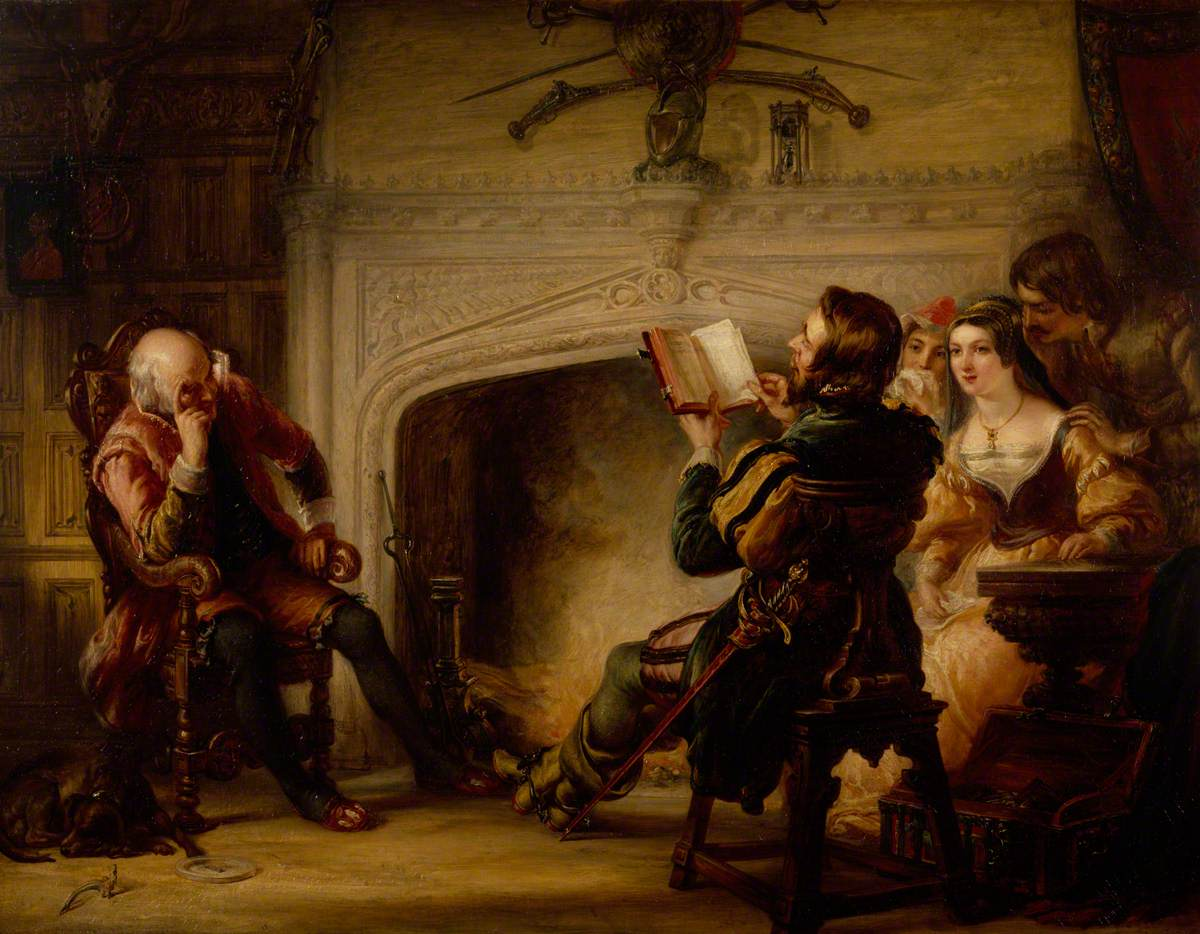
An Early Reading of Shakespeare, 1838

Lady Jane Grey at Her Place of Execution, 1839

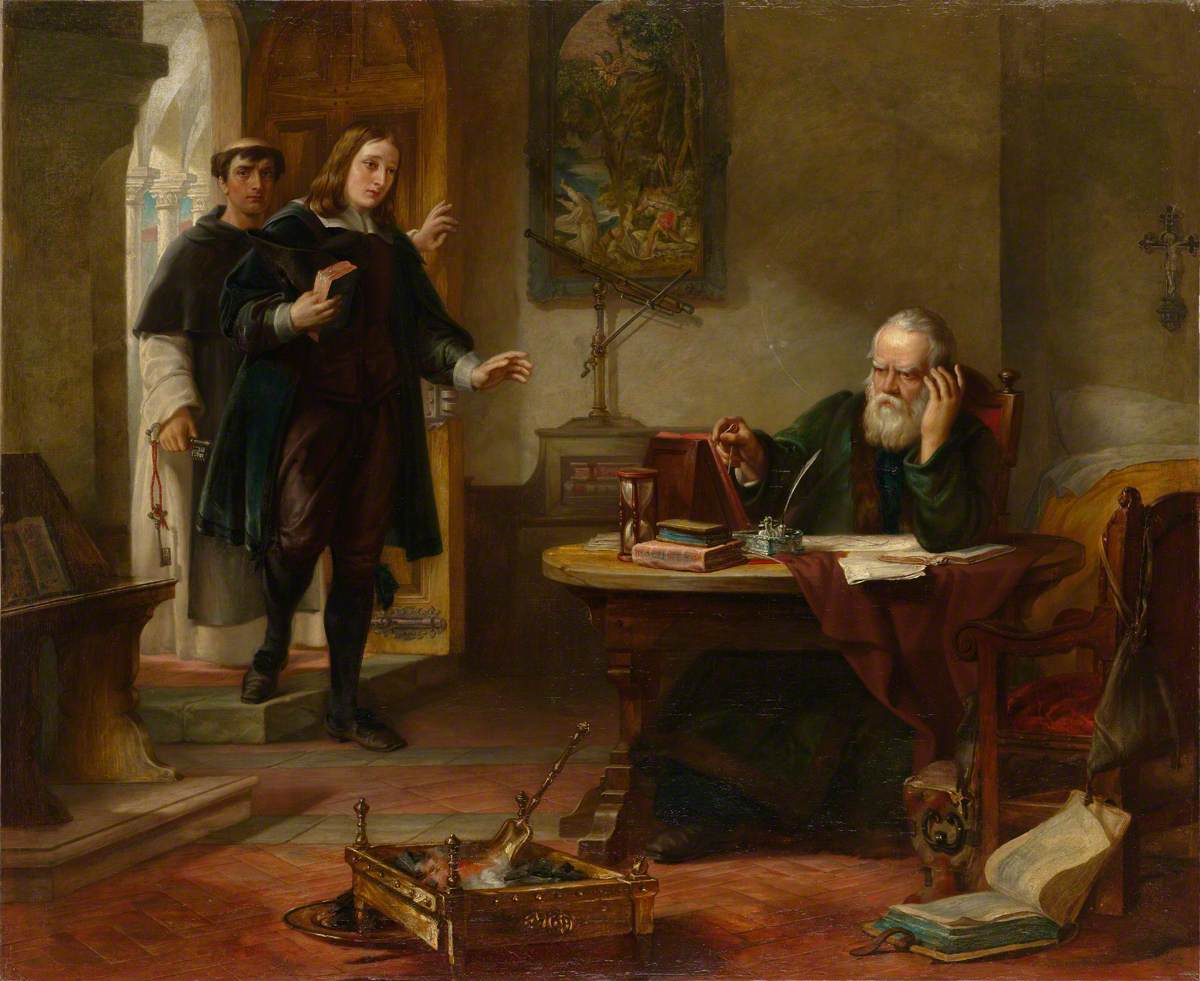
John Milton Visiting Galileo When a Prisoner of the Inquisition, 1847

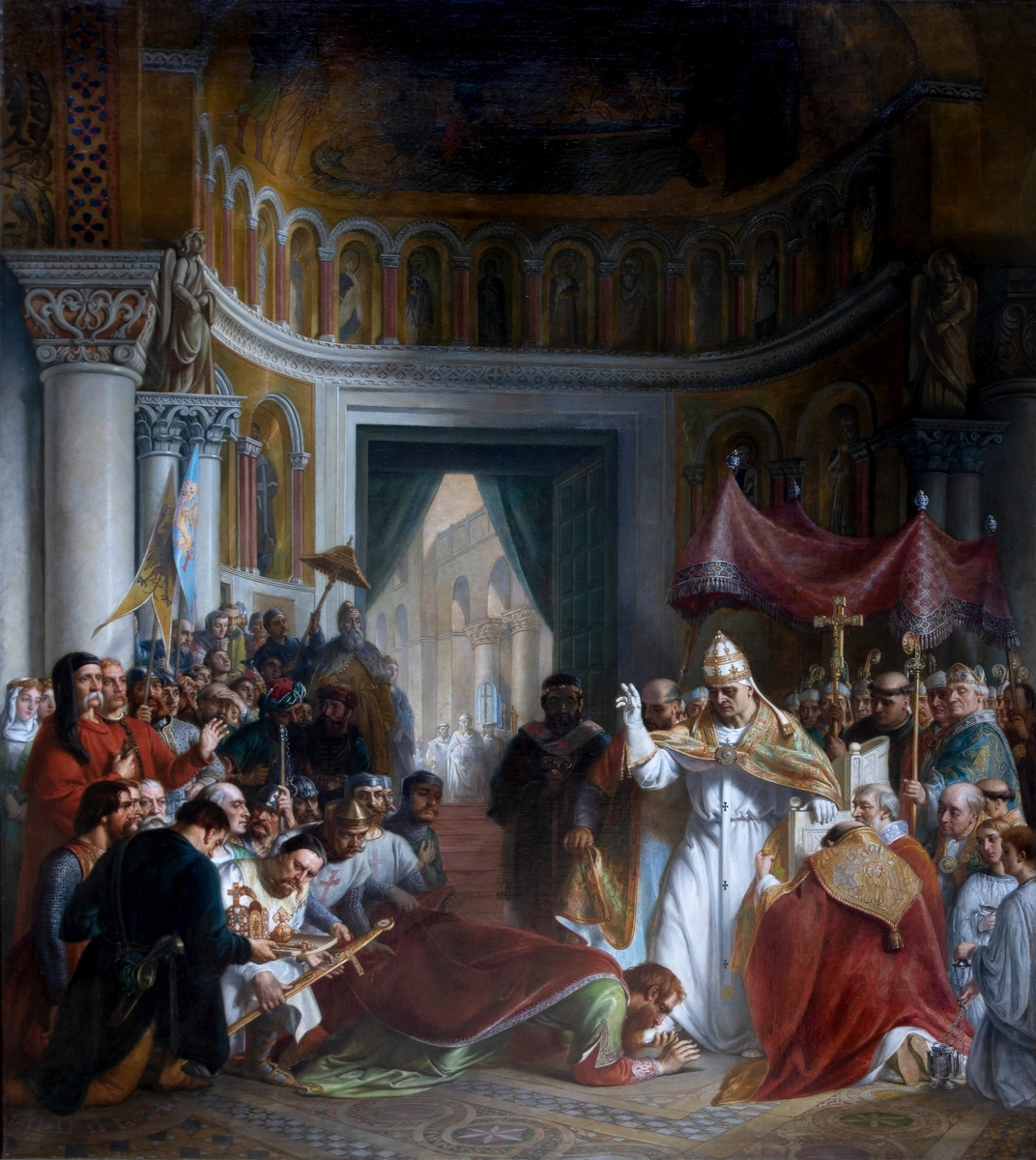
The Submission of the Emperor Barbarossa to Pope Alexander III, 1867

== References and sources ==
- This article incorporates text from a publication now in the public domain: Wood, James, ed. (1907). The Nuttall Encyclopædia. London and New York: Frederick Warne.
- "Obituary". The Jewish Chronicle. 17 June 1881.
- Roth, Cecil (1961). Jewish Art: An Illustrated History. McGraw-Hill.
- Salaman, Malcolm (2005). Shakespeare in Pictorial Art. Kessinger Publishing. ISBN 1-4179-7027-8.
- Van Voolen, Edward (2006). Jewish art and culture. Prestel. ISBN 9783791333625.
- Cohen, Richard I. (1998). Jewish icons. University of California Press. ISBN 0-520-20545-6.
- Ripley, George; Dana, Charles Anderson (1860). "The new American cyclopædia, ed. by G. Ripley and C.A. DanaThe new American cyclopædia, ed. by G. Ripley and C.A. Dana, American cyclopaedia". The New American Cyclopaedia. D. Appleton & Company. p. 743.
- Sandby, William (1862). The History of the Royal Academy of Arts from Its Foundation in 1768 to the Present Time. Longman.
- Valentine, Helen (2004). "Hart, Solomon Alexander (1806–1881)". Oxford Dictionary of National Biography. Oxford University Press.
