= Alphonse François =

French engraver

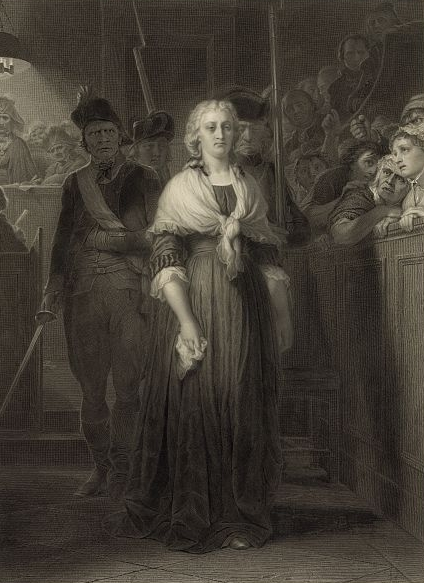
Marie-Antoinette au Tribunal révolutionnaire, after a painting of Paul Delaroche.

Alphonse François (25 August 1814, Paris - 7 July 1888, Paris) was a French engraver.

== Biography ==
He was born on August 25, 1814, in Paris.

Alphonse François and his elder brother Charles-Rémy-Jules François (died 1861) learned engraving at the school of Louis-Pierre Henriquel-Dupont. He did a large number of engravings, from works by contemporary French painters and by old Italian masters.

François was made an officer of the Légion d'honneur in 1857 and a member of the Académie des Beaux-Arts of the Institut de France in 1873. He died in 1888, at the age of 77.

== Works ==
- Bonaparte franchissant les Alpes (“Bonaparte crossing the Alps”),
- Marie-Antoinette au Tribunal révolutionnaire (“Marie Antoinette before the revolutionary tribunal”) and
- Le jeune Pic de la Mirandole apprenant à lire avec sa mère (“The young Giovanni Pico della Mirandola learning from his mother how to read”), after Paul Delaroche;
- La vision d'Ézéchiel (“The vision of Ezekiel”), after Raphael;
- La tentation du Christ (“The temptation of Christ”),
- Mignon et son père (“Mignon and her father”) and
- Mignon dans l'église (“Mignon in the church”), after Ary Scheffer;
- L'épouse du roi Candaule (“The wife of the king Candaules”), after Jean-Léon Gérôme;
- Le couronnement de la Vierge Marie (“The crowning of the Virgin Mary,” from the chapel of San Jacopo Maggiore in Fiesole), an engraving which won him a medal in 1867.

== Bibliography ==
- Meyers Konversations-Lexikon.
