= View of the 1867 Exposition Universelle =

Painting by Édouard Manet

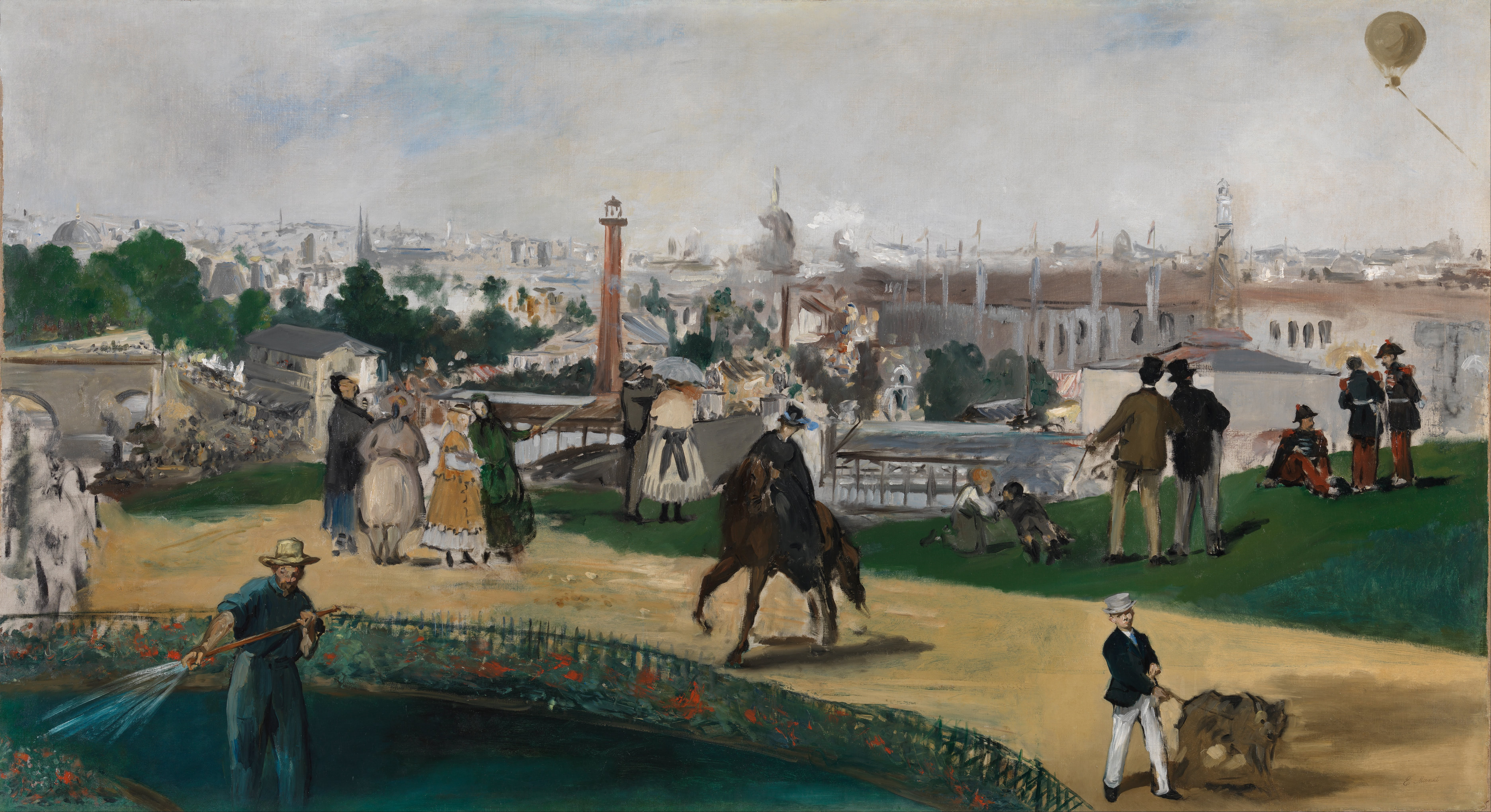
- Artist: Édouard Manet
- Year: 1867
- Type: Oil on canvas, cityscape painting
- Dimensions: 108 cm × 196 cm (43 in × 77 in)
- Location: National Museum of Norway, Oslo

View of the 1867 Exposition Universelle is an 1867 oil painting by the French artist Édouard Manet. A cityscape it offers a panoramic view of the Exposition Universelle then being held in Paris. The vantage point is from the meeting of the Rue Franklin and Rue Vineuse near the Trocadéro looking across the Pont d'Iéna towards the Champ de Mars.

It was likely to have been produced en plein air between the opening of the Exposition on 1 April and Manet's departure for Boulogne in August. The painting is now in the National Museum of Norway in Oslo, which acquired it in 1923.

== See also ==
- List of paintings by Édouard Manet

== Bibliography ==
- Mainardi, Patricia. Art and Politics of the Second Empire: The Universal Expositions of 1855 and 1867. Yale University Press, 1987.
- Milner, John. Art, War and Revolution in France, 1870-1871: Myth, Reportage and Reality. Yale University Press, 2000.
