= The Races at Longchamp =

1866 painting by Édouard Manet

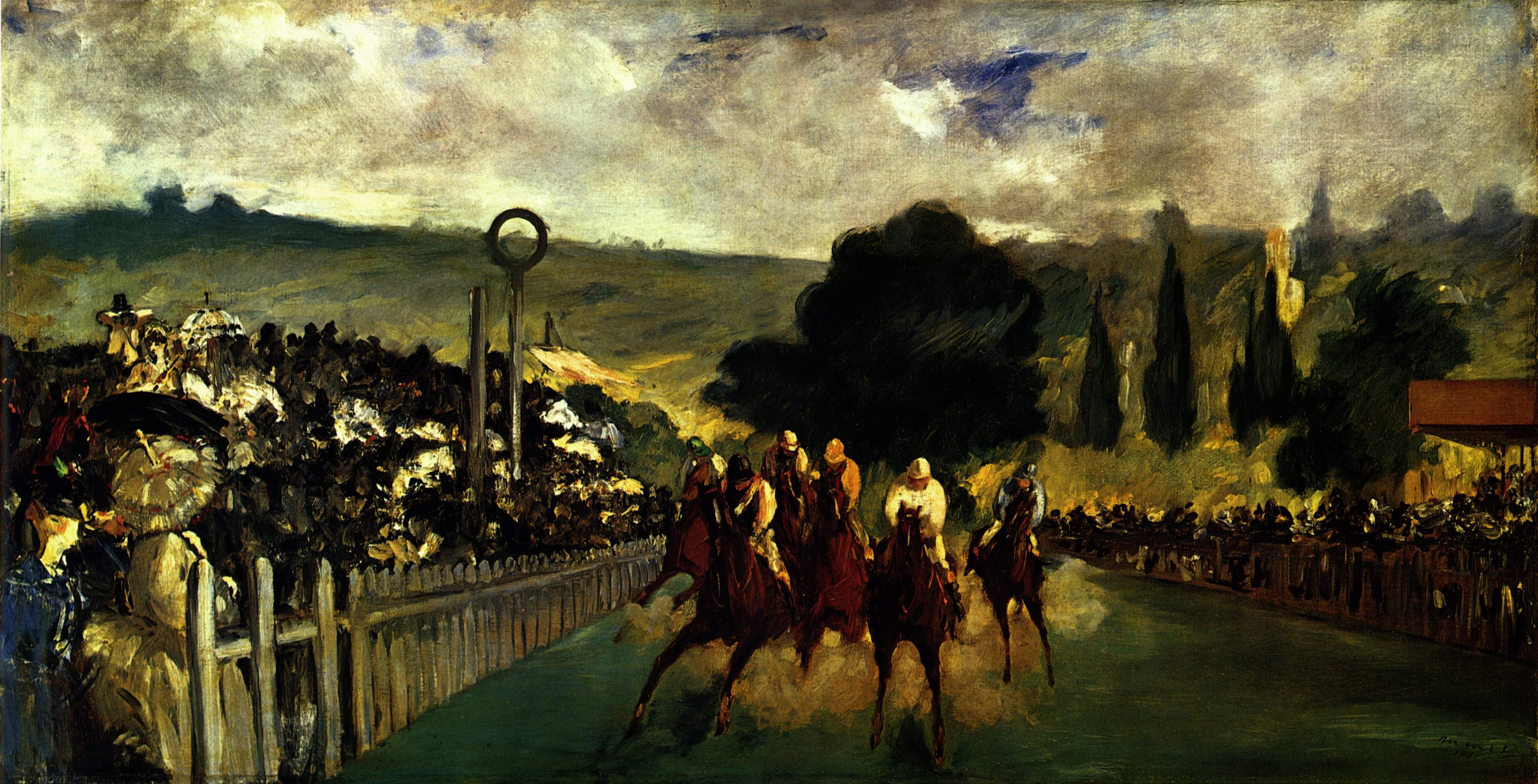
- Artist: Édouard Manet
- Year: 1866
- Medium: oil on canvas
- Dimensions: 84.5 cm × 43.9 cm (33.3 in × 17.3 in)
- Location: Art Institute of Chicago, Chicago

The Races at Longchamp is an 1866 painting by the French artist Édouard Manet. The Impressionist painting depicts the ending of the Second Grand Prix de Paris at Longchamp. It is currently in the collection of the Art Institute of Chicago. This painting is one of four depictions of the same subject that Manet created over four years. The painting reflects the rise of horse racing in France, following the influence of the British. The work is thought to be the first painting to present horses coming directly toward the viewer, and it uses various techniques to reduce the sense of depth.

== Background ==
=== Rise of horse racing in France ===
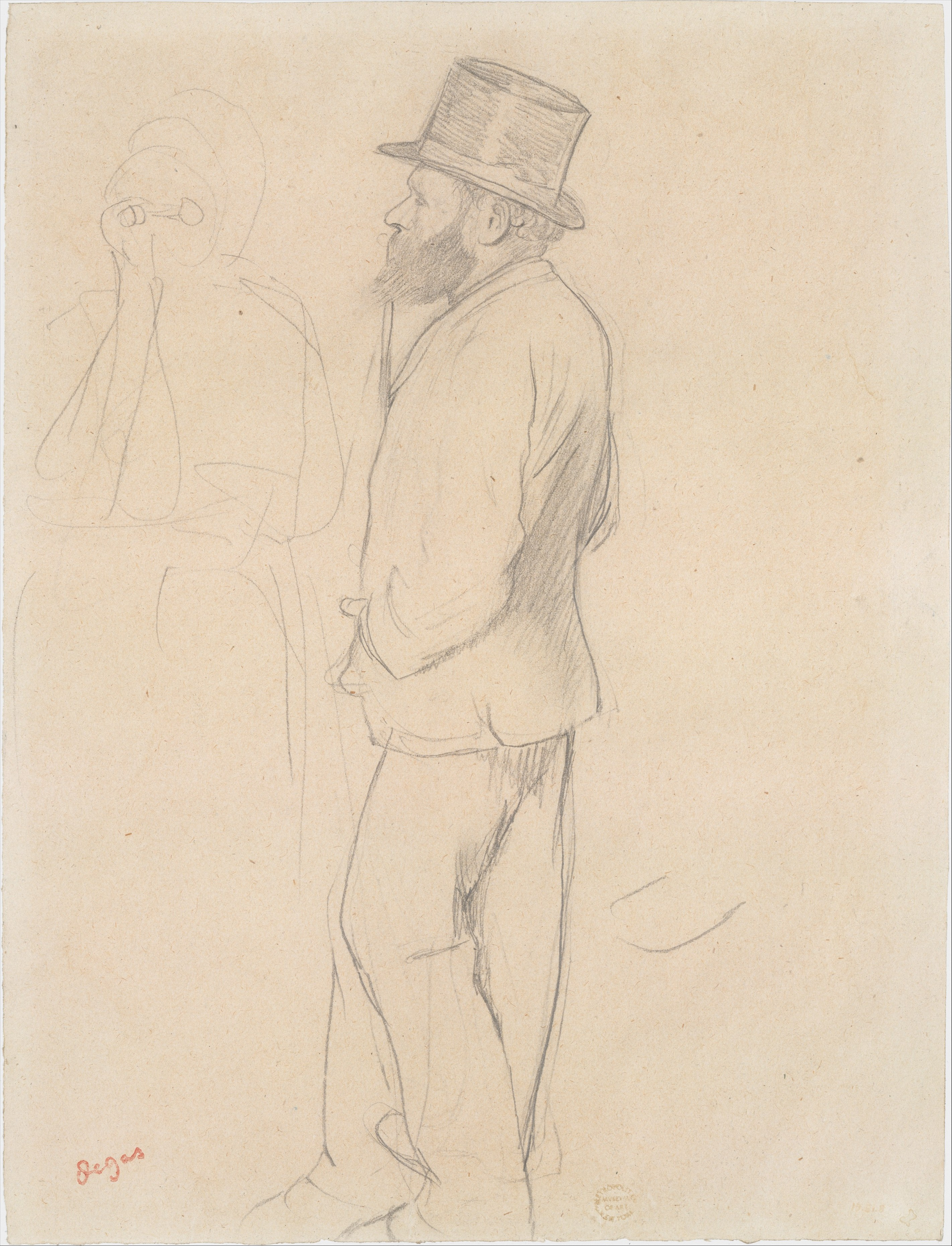
A sketch of Manet at Longchamp by Degas

Before the 1830s, horses' only use in French society was for royal hunts, parades, or fairs. But in the 1830s, horse racing began to take hold, primarily due to the influence of the British. Many French émigrés who had left during Napoleon's reign and were returning after the Battle of Waterloo had stayed in Britain during their leave and returned with a newfound love of horse racing, which was already strong in Britain among the upper class. Napoleon III, who would begin his reign in 1842 and strongly influence the nation, also grew up in Britain and brought home an interest in horse racing. Finally, many British businessmen at the time were living in French cities, including Paris, and were leaving their impression on French social life. They began establishing clubs in France, including "The Jockey Club," which would be play a major part in the creation of Longchamp.

=== Creation and significance of the Hippodrome de Longchamp ===
As Napoleon III was considering plans for the Bois de Boulogne, he was approached by the Jockey Club to consider a racetrack as part of the park. Previously, the club's only tracks were lower tier, and they recognized the benefits that a new track presented to them and France. Charles de Morny, later duc de Morny, was a powerful member of the club and was the leading creator of the plans for Longchamp. Napoleon, who was fond of horse racing, was eager to agree to Morny's plan, realizing that it would bring them closer to the status of Britain and create another public attraction.

Paris would continue to own the land and pay for the changes to the grounds to make it suitable for racing. The Jockey Club would put their resources towards the racecourse infrastructure, such as the stands, and received a fifty-year lease with annual rent. The building was done somewhat poorly, but the course was eventually opened in 1857.

Longchamp quickly became well known and was a popular spot for upper-class visitors. While its most popular times were during racing season, from April to September, it was still used for social events during the off-season. Most visitors did not follow the races closely, instead using the pretext of the race to socialize. Attendees included artists such as Manet and Degas (who sketched Manet at Longchamp). The Jockey Club put together races such as the Grand Prix and paid out the rewards to the winning horses, often using money raised by outside sources. For example, the first Grand Prix in 1863 was funded by both Paris and the five main rail companies in France.

=== Manet and horse racing ===
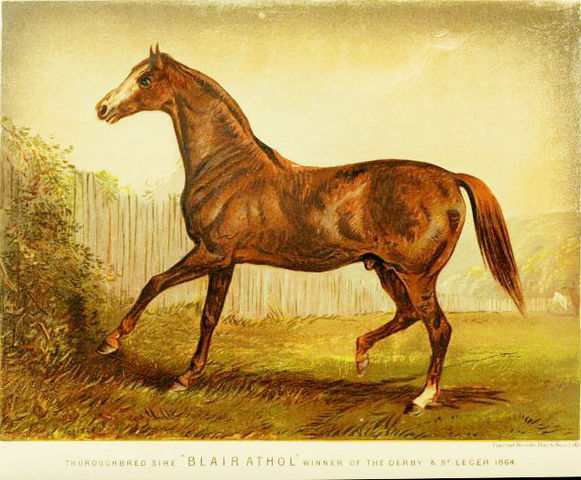
Favorite of the 1864 Grand Prix, Blair Athol

A major desire for horse racing art arose from wealthy British men asking for pieces based on horses and races that had won them money through gambling. Prints of these works would inevitably reach France, which would provide inspiration to Manet, proven by comments left in his notebooks acknowledging the prints. Manet's first full horse race painting was Les Courses de Chantilly, created in 1864. But prior to this, there is evidence of Manet sketching race scenes in his notebooks, such as in a notebook dated 1855. These sketches were primarily a study of the crowd at the racecourse or the scenery behind it, not the race itself. Manet probably drew these sketches at a lower-tier race course since they were drawn from a low vantage point. Manet most likely started Longchamp while working on Le Déjeuner sur l'herbe, which may have inspired the painting.

=== Second running of the Grand Prix de Paris ===
On Sunday, June 5, 1864, the second running of the Grand Prix de Paris was held at Longchamp. The first Grand Prix the year prior saw an English horse win the race. A hundred thousand Parisians, including Manet, watched the 1864 race unfold as the favorite, Blair Athol, an English horse, raced against the local star Vermouth. Blair had won the 1864 Epsom Derby and was a 2-1 favorite at post-time. But Blair never led and Vermouth won by two full-lengths. This race would be the setting of Manet's painting.

== Description and analysis ==
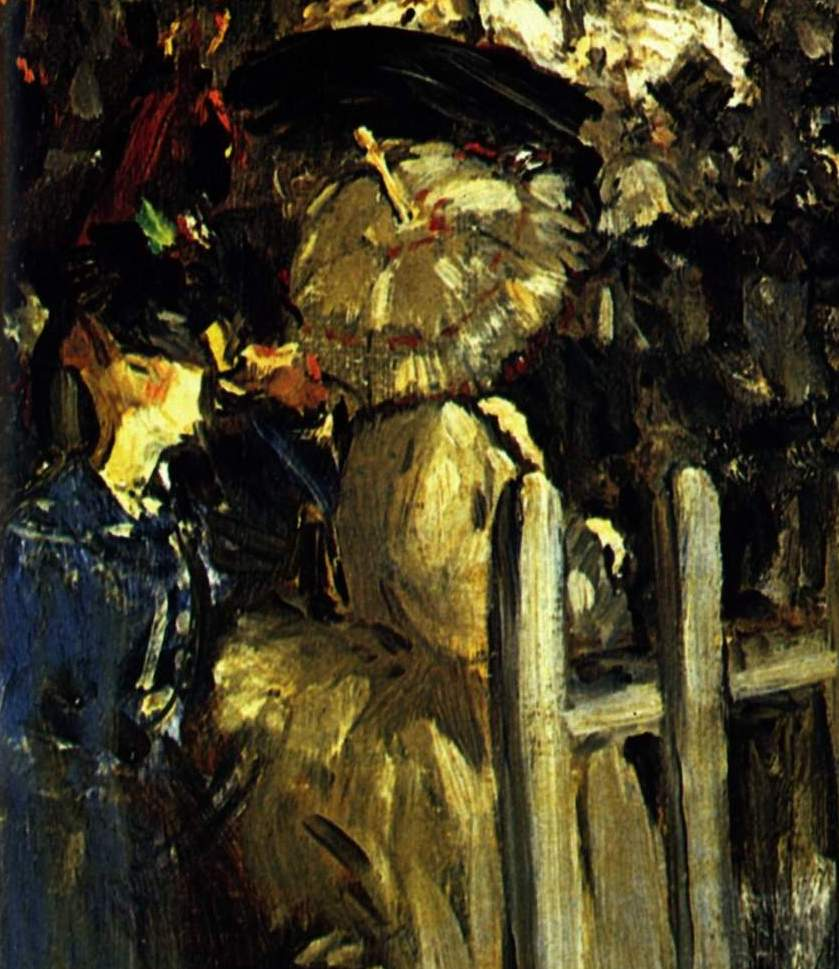
Manet's wife at the bottom left of the painting

The most noteworthy aspect of the work is the unprecedented view of horses racing directly toward the viewer. Before this, horse racing was generally shown from the side, and Manet himself would go back to this in 1872 in his work The Races in the Bois de Boulogne. The art historian Juliet Wilson-Bareau notes that this presentation of the horses makes them appear "as if exploding from a distant mass of trees in the background." The viewer, who seems to be standing on the track, is set facing south, towards Saint-Cloud.

The pole with the circle on top marks the race's finish line, which serves an important role for Manet. Wilson-Bareau comments that "a sweep of green hills high up on the canvas, on the distant horizon, is 'pinned' to the foreground and the picture plane by the circular top of a furlong marker on the track," reducing the perceived depth of the work. Manet further manipulates the depth of the work, according to the art historian Françoise Cachin, by creating "an effect analogous to that of a photographer telescoping toward a subject with a zoom lens; the area in focus grows in proportion to the framing edges, and the depth of field decreases."

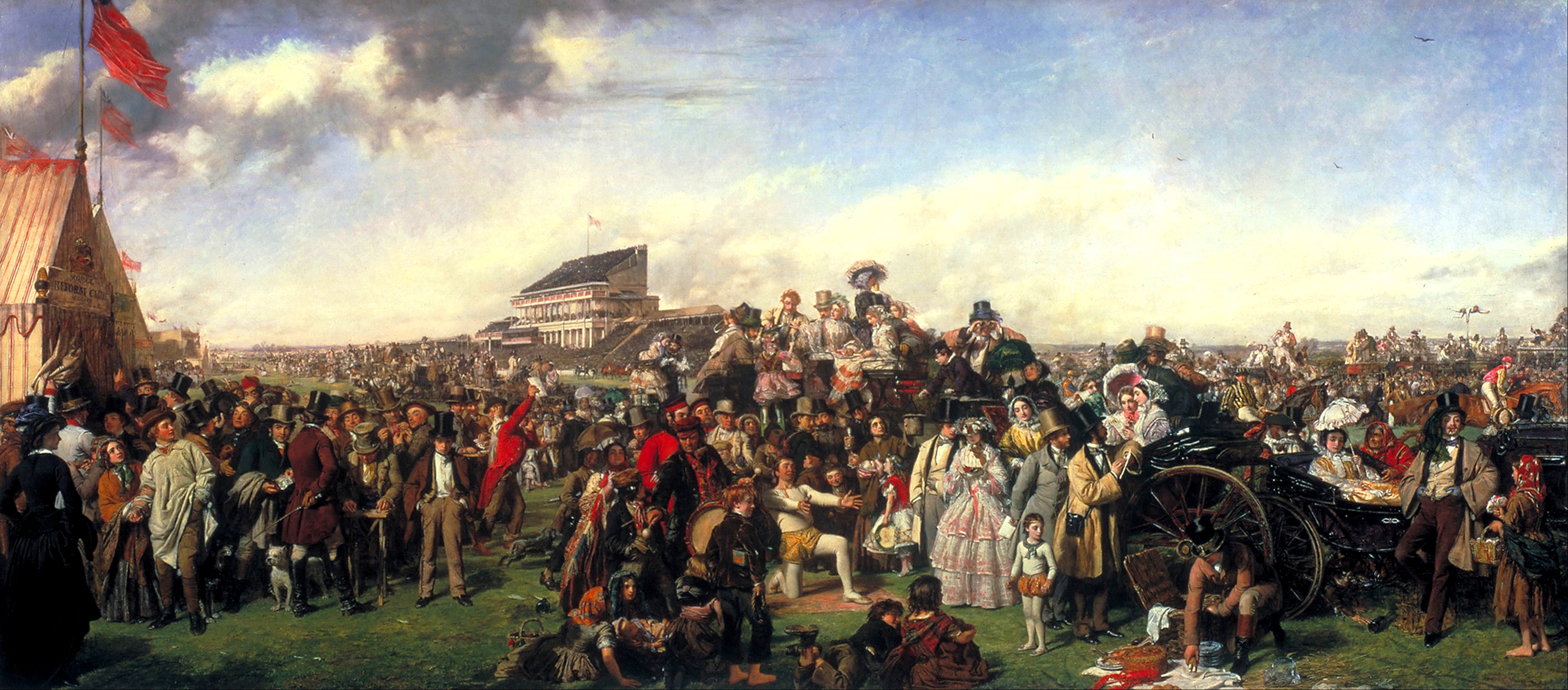
William Frith's The Derby Day

While both sides show the crowd paying full attention to the race, the left side of the painting depicts the wealthier part of the crowd, which is clearer than the crowd on the right side. Manet draws attention to multiple details in the crowd. First, in the bottom left, there are two women spectators. The second woman in beige is Manet's wife, Suzanne Leenhoff, who had also modeled for Manet in previous portraits. Further in the background, a man is standing holding binoculars, watching the race. This man is taken straight from William Powell Frith's The Derby Day, where he appears in the middle of the work holding binoculars. Finally, a pink banner can be seen in the back, flying over the crowd.

On the right side of the painting, the Tribune Publique stands above part of the crowd. This building catches the viewer's eye, "emphasizing the flatness of the canvas yet also the sense of speed, recession, and limitless space," according to Wilson-Bareau.

Manet constructed the work using very loose brushstrokes. The track the horses run on is composed primarily of horizontal strokes, like the top of the hill. The rest of the hill is constructed of diagonal strokes, as are the two full trees, the large one directly behind the horses. The thinner trees and the fence are made mainly vertical strokes. The sky and crowd are both made of varied dabs of paint.

== Versions ==
=== 1864 painting ===
This was the original painting Manet made of Longchamp and is believed to have been submitted by him to an 1865 exhibition hosted by the art dealer Louis Martinet. However, there is debate over this fact. In a letter, Manet told Martinet he would send nine works, but he ultimately sent six works, of which two were displayed. It remains unclear whether Longchamp was among the two. Manet cut the painting up in 1865. Only two pieces of the composition are known to survive.

=== 1864 watercolor ===
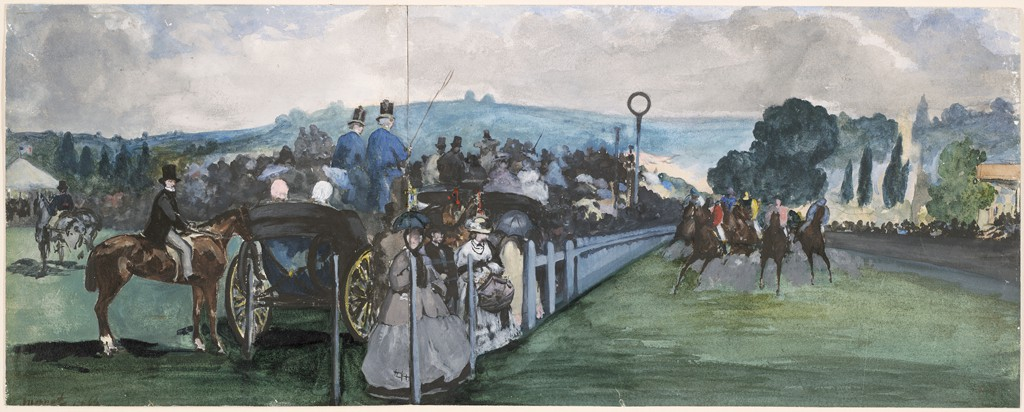
1864 watercolor

The timing of this work is also unclear. It may have been completed before the 1864 oil painting to assist Manet in completing that work, or it may have been made after the painting in an attempt to preserve the work. The watercolor is made up of two separate sheets joined, with the right sheet resembling the Chicago painting. The work is currently held at the Fogg Art Museum.

=== Chicago painting ===
The oil painting held at the Art Institute of Chicago is the most widely known version of the work and was created in 1866. While there had been debate about its creation date due to the smudging of the inscription on the work (read variously as 1865 or 1867), a microscopic examination of the work indicated that the date is 1866. The relationship of this work to the other versions is also unresolved. Art historian Theodore Reff writes, "although [this painting] shows the most important section of the large composition [Manet] exhibited in 1865, it cannot actually belong to it; it is painted in a more vigorous, sketchy style than the surviving two fragments, and it includes at the lower left two female spectators very close to those shown in one of the fragments." Reff further concludes that the work must have been done in preparation for the 1867 painting as both shared a one to two scale. But Jean Harris claims that this work "must be a further reworking of the right section of the original [1864] painting" done by a "desire for simplification and unification."

=== 1867 painting ===
This work was a piece of the 1864 painting and was displayed by Manet in 1867. However, this painting has been lost, with the last known sighting of it being in 1871 in Manet's studio.

== Reception ==
After the painting's exhibition, it received generally negative reviews. Critics dismissed it as a sketch; the journalist Joséphin Péladan described it as a "nice sketch, one that could be a painting." Since then, it has been widely accepted as a finished painting.

== See also ==
- List of paintings by Édouard Manet
- 1866 in art
