= The Submission of the Emperor Barbarossa to Pope Alexander III =

Painting by Solomon Hart

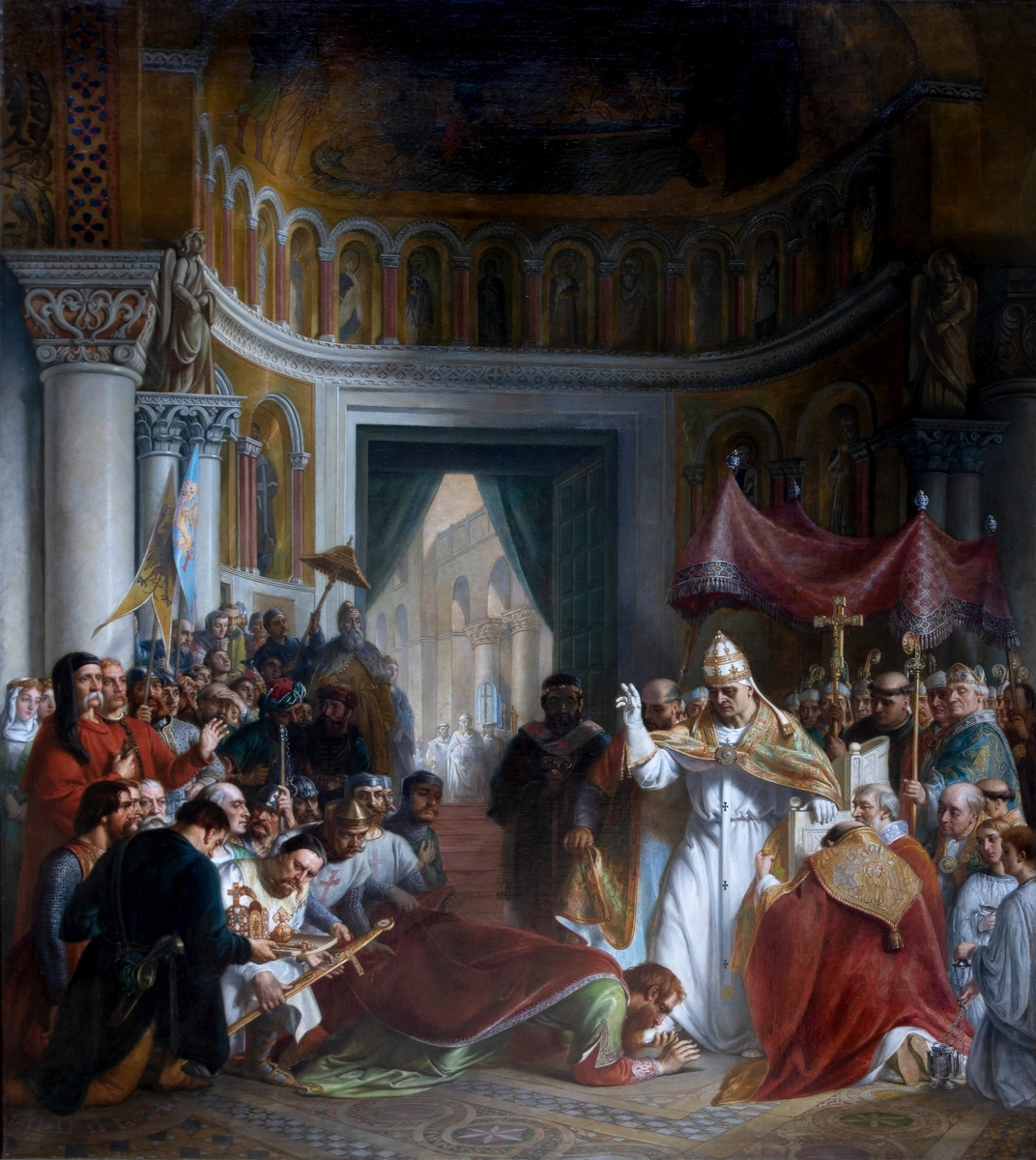
- Artist: Solomon Hart
- Year: 1867
- Type: Oil on canvas, history painting
- Dimensions: 218 cm × 175 cm (86 in × 69 in)
- Location: Russell-Cotes Art Gallery, Bournemouth

The Submission of the Emperor Barbarossa to Pope Alexander III is an oil on canvas history painting by the British artist Solomon Hart, from 1867.

== History and description ==
It depicts a scene set in Venice in 1177. After his defeat at the Battle of Legnano the previous year Frederick Barbarossa, the Holy Roman Emperor, submits to Pope Alexander III, acknowledging his authority in the Papal States.

The Plymouth-born Hart was the first Jewish artist to be elected to the Royal Academy of Arts. He was noted for his history paintings and literary and religious scenes. The painting was displayed at the Royal Academy Exhibition of 1867 held at the National Gallery in London. It was subsequently acquired by the art collector Merton Russell-Cotes, who in 1921 left it to the Russell-Cotes Museum in Bournemouth.

== See also ==
- Cultural depictions of Frederick Barbarossa

== Bibliography ==
- Bills, Mark. Art in the Age of Queen Victoria: A Wealth of Depictions. Russell-Cotes Art Gallery and Museum, 2001.
- Cohen, Richard I. The Emergence of Jewish Artists in Nineteenth-century Europe. Merrell, 2001.
