= The Destruction of the Temple of Jerusalem =

Painting by Francesco Hayez

The Destruction of The Temple of Jerusalem
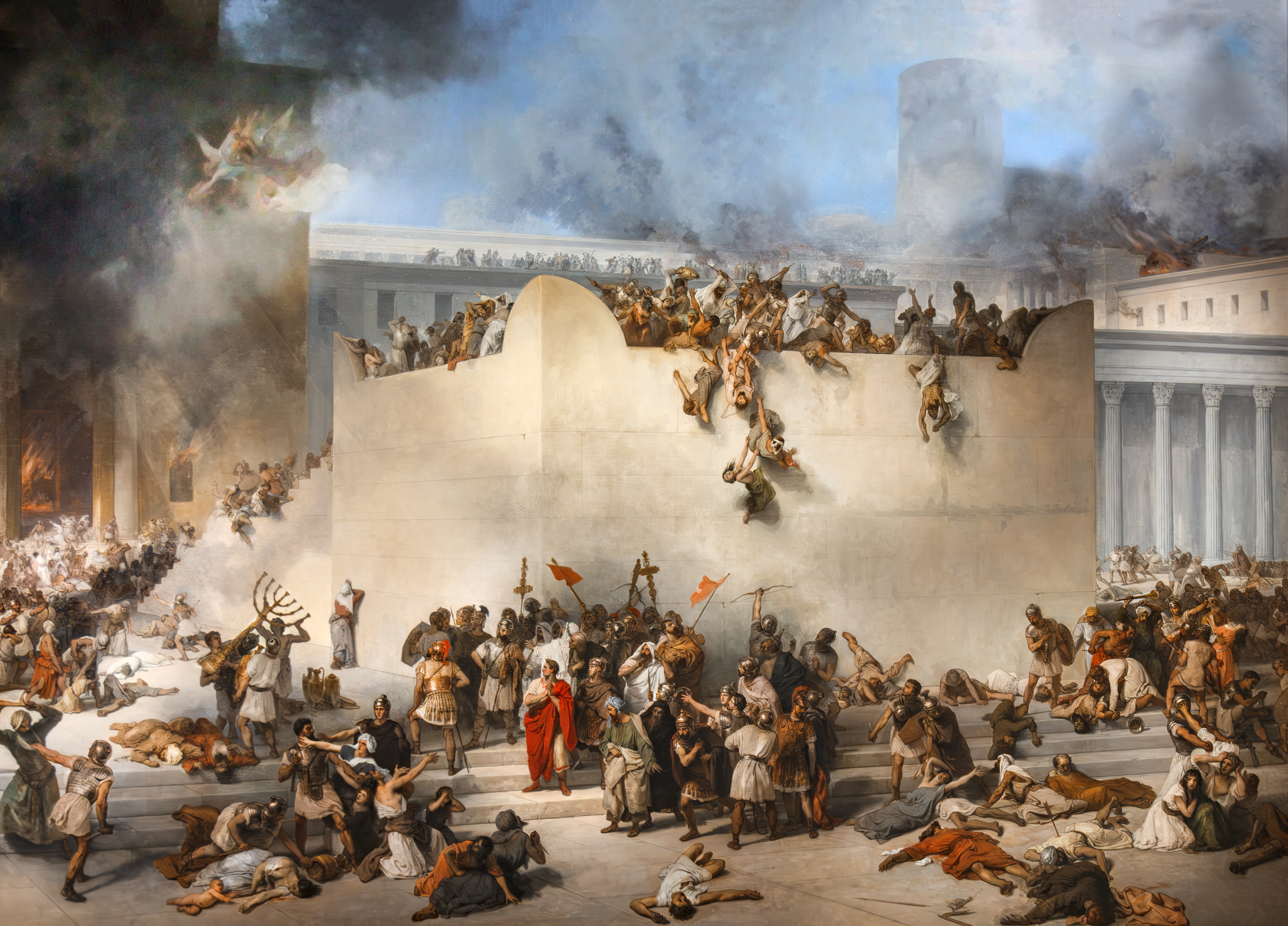
- Artist: Francesco Hayez
- Year: 1867
- Type: Oil on canvas, history painting
- Dimensions: 183 cm × 282 cm (72 in × 111 in)
- Location: Gallerie dell'Accademia, Venice

The Destruction of The Temple of Jerusalem (Italian: La distruzione del tempio di Gerusalemme) is an 1867 history painting by the Italian artist Francesco Hayez. It depicts the destruction of the Second Temple in Jerusalem during the storming of the city by Roman Army during the Great Jewish Revolt. It was a significant moment in the development of the diaspora of the Jews across Europe and the Middle of East. Hayez based his depiction on the description of the historian Josephus.

Hayez was a prominent figure of the Italian romantic movement, who painted a number of biblical scenes. He began the work in 1860, taking seven years to complete it. It featured in the annual exhibition of the Brera Academy in Milan in 1867. Today the painting is in the collection of the Gallerie dell'Accademia in Venice. A more panoramic view of the destruction of Jerusalem has been painted by the Scottish artist David Roberts in 1848.

== Bibliography ==
- Balfour, Alan. Solomon's Temple: Myth, Conflict, and Faith. John Wiley & Sons, 2012.
- Stähler, Axel. The Destruction of Jerusalem in Nineteenth-Century German Culture. Walter de Gruyter, 2025.
