= The Death of Caesar (Gérôme) =

1867 painting by Jean-Léon Gérôme

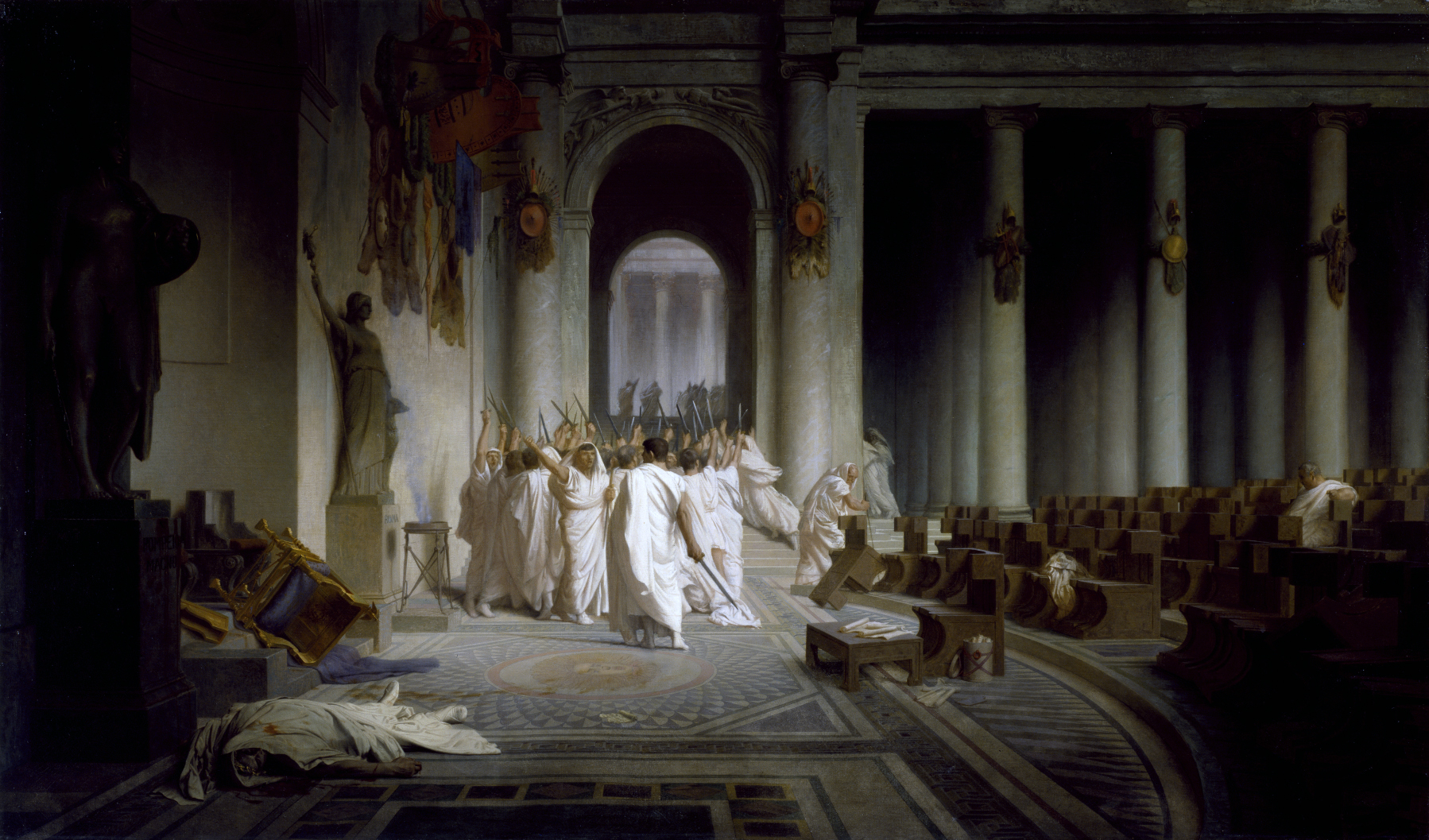
- Artist: Jean-Léon Gérôme
- Year: 1867
- Medium: Oil on canvas
- Dimensions: 85.5 cm × 145.5 cm (33.7 in × 57.3 in)
- Location: Walters Art Museum, Baltimore

The Death of Caesar (French: La Mort de César) is an 1867 painting by the French artist Jean-Léon Gérôme. It depicts the moment after the assassination of Julius Caesar, when the jubilant conspirators are walking away from Caesar's dead body at the Theatre of Pompey, on the Ides of March (March 15), 44 BC. The painting is kept at the Walters Art Museum in Baltimore, Maryland.

Characteristically, Gérôme has depicted not the incident itself, but its immediate aftermath. The illusion of reality that Gérôme imparted to his paintings with his smooth, polished technique led one critic to comment, "If photography had existed in Caesar's day, one could believe that the picture was painted from a photograph taken on the spot at the very moment of the catastrophe."

Gérôme's depiction of the aftermath of violence can also be seen in The Execution of Marshal Ney, The Duel After the Masquerade, and Jerusalem.

== Exhibitions ==
The Walters indicates that the work has been included in the following exhibitions:

- I, Claudius: Art in the Age of Julio-Claudians. The Walters Art Gallery, Baltimore. 1977–1978.
- The Second Empire 1852-1870: Art in France under Napoleon III. Galeries nationales du Grand Palais, Paris; Philadelphia Museum of Art, Philadelphia; The Detroit Institute of Arts, Detroit. 1978–1979.
- Paris 1889: American Artists at the Universal Exposition. Pennsylvania Academy of the Fine Arts, Philadelphia. 1990.
- Manet and the Execution of Maximilian. 1992.
- Parallels and Precedents: Baltimore's George A. Lucas Collection. Baltimore Museum of Art, Baltimore. 1995.
- Millet and Barbizon Art. Matsumoto City Museum, Matsumoto City; Tokuyama City Museum of Art and History, Tokuyama; Kasama Nichido Museum, Kasama City; Ishikawa Prefectural Museum of Art, Kanazawa. 1996.
- Before Monet: Landscape Painting in France and Impressionist Masters: Highlights from The Walters Collection. The Walters Art Gallery, Baltimore. 1998.
- Highlights from the Collection. The Walters Art Gallery, Baltimore. 1998–2001.
- Triumph of French Painting: Masterpieces from Ingres to Matisse. Baltimore Museum of Art, Baltimore; Philbrook Museum of Art, Tulsa; Norton Museum of Art, West Palm Beach; Dayton Art Institute, Dayton; Royal Academy of Arts, London; Albright-Knox Art Gallery, Buffalo. 2000–2002.
- A Magnificent Age: Masterpieces from the Walters Art Museum, Baltimore. The Walters Art Museum, Baltimore; The Nelson-Atkins Museum of Art, Kansas City; Mint Museum of Art, Charlotte. 2002–2004.
- The Spectacular Art of Jean-Léon Gérôme. J. Paul Getty Museum, Los Angeles; Musee D'Orsay, Paris; Museo Thyssen-Bornemisza, Madrid. 2010–2011.
- From Rye to Raphael: The Walters Story. The Walters Art Museum, Baltimore. 2014–2016.

== Provenance ==
- M. J. Allard
- John Taylor Johnston [date and mode of acquisition unknown]
- John Taylor Johnston Sale, New York, 1876, no. 188
- John Jacob Astor [date and mode of acquisition unknown]
- Boussod Veladon et Cie [date and mode of acquisition unknown]
- James B. Haggin et al. Sale, New York, April 5, 1917, no. 148
- 1917: purchased by Henry Walters, Baltimore
- 1931: bequeathed to Walters Art Museum by Henry Walters
