= 1847 in art =

Events from the year 1847 in art.

== Events ==
- 1 May – The Salon of 1847 opens at the Louvre in Paris
- 3 May – The Royal Academy Exhibition of 1847 opens at the National Gallery in London
- 22 December – The Vernon Gift is given by the art collector Robert Vernon to the National Gallery in London, forming the basis of the Gallery's collection by British artists
- unknown date – William Dyce is commissioned to decorate the Queen's Robing Room at the newly completed Palace of Westminster in London.

== Works ==
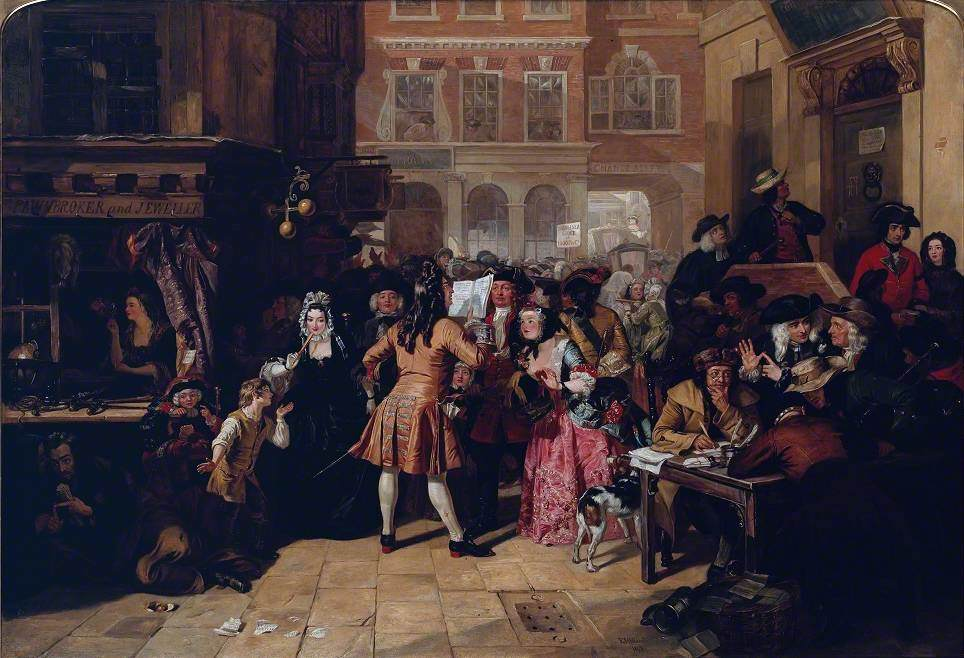
The South Sea Bubble by Edward Matthew Ward

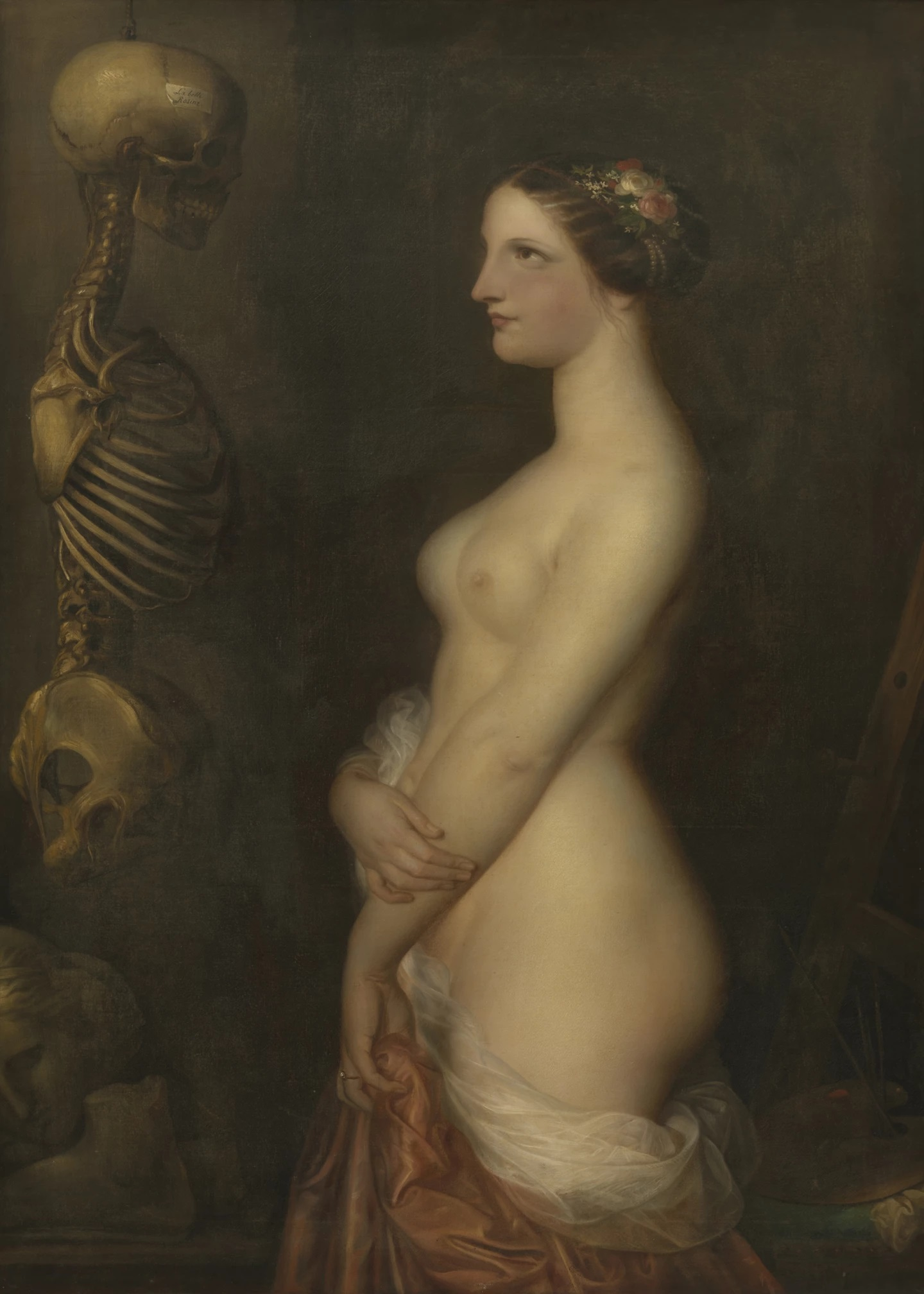
Antoine Wiertz – Deux jeunes filles (La Belle Rosine)

- Edward Armitage – The Battle of Meeanee
- John Wilson Carmichael – HMS Erebus and Terror in the Antarctic
- Thomas Cole – Indian Pass Tawahus
- Thomas Couture – The Romans in their Decadence
- Alexandre-Gabriel Decamps – The Anchorage of Smyrna
- William Powell Frith – An English Merrymaking a Hundred Years Ago
- Jean-Léon Gérôme – The Cock Fight
- Frederick Goodall – The Village Holiday
- Solomon Hart – John Milton Visiting Galileo When a Prisoner of the Inquisition
- John Rogers Herbert – Our Saviour Subject to His Parents in Nazareth
- Edward Hicks – Penn's Treaty
- Robert Huskisson – The Midsummer Night's Fairies
- Charles Lees – The Golfers
- Rafaelle Monti - Veiled Vestal
- David Roberts
  - Edinburgh from the Castle
  - West Front of Antwerp Cathedral
- Theodor Sockl – Clara Adelheid Soterius von Sachsenheim
- Clarkson Stanfield – French Troops Fording the Magra
- Joseph Karl Stieler – Portrait of Lola Montez
- Antoine Wiertz – Deux jeunes filles (La Belle Rosine)
- Alexandre Cabanel – The Fallen Angel
- Edward Matthew Ward – The South Sea Bubble
- George Frederic Watts – Alfred Inciting the Saxons to Prevent the Landing of the Danes

== Births ==
- January 15 – Camille Doncieux, French artists' model, first wife of Monet (died 1879)
- February 10 – Anne de Rochechouart de Mortemart, French patron and sculptor (died 1933)
- March 1 - Thomas Brock, English sculptor and medallist (died 1922)
- March 19 – Albert Pinkham Ryder, American painter (died 1917)
- April 1 – Hamilton Hamilton, English-born American painter (died 1928)
- April 16 – Ellen Thayer Fisher, American botanical painter (died 1911)
- July 20 – Max Liebermann, German painter (died 1935)
- September 10 – Kobayashi Kiyochika, Japanese painter and printmaker (died 1915)
- September 11 – T. C. Steele, American painter (died 1926)
- October 6 – Adolf von Hildebrand, German sculptor (died 1921)
- October 15 – Ralph Albert Blakelock, American painter (died 1919)
- October 20 - Frits Thaulow, Norwegian painter (died 1906)
- November 10 – Frederick Arthur Bridgman, American painter (died 1928)
- date unknown – Vladislav Titelbah, Serbian painter (died 1925).

== Deaths ==
- January 1 – William Derby, English miniature painter and copyist (born 1786)
- January 4 – Alexey Venetsianov, Russian painter especially of peasant life and ordinary people (born 1780)
- January 16 – Michael Sigismund Frank, German glass painter (born 1770)
- February – Sampson Towgood Roch, Irish painter of miniatures (born 1757)
- February 17 – William Collins, English painter (born 1788)
- March 17 – Jean Ignace Isidore Gérard Grandville (J. J. Grandville), French caricaturist (born 1803)
- May 28 – Henry Hoppner Meyer, English portrait painter and engraver (born 1780)
- June 9 – Joachim Christian Reinhart, German painter and etcher (born 1761)
- July 1 – Georg Friedrich Kersting, German painter of Biedermeier-style interior paintings (born 1785)
- August 17 – Thomas Griffiths Wainewright, English-born painter, art critic, forger and probable serial poisoner (born 1794).
- August 29 – William Simson, Scottish-born painter (born 1799)
- September 15 – Jan Mooy, Dutch marine art painter (born 1776)
- September 28 – Johann Michael Sattler, Austrian portrait and landscape painter (born 1786)
- December 11 – Thomas Barker, British painter of landscape and rural life (born 1769)
- December 29 – William Crotch, English musician and painter (born 1775)
- date unknown
  - Élise Bruyère, French painter specializing in portraits and floral still life (born 1776)
  - Amelia Curran, Irish painter (born 1775)
  - Ferdinand Wolfgang Flachenecker, German painter (born 1792)
  - Guillaume-Joseph Roques, French painter (born 1757)
- approximate date – Sin Wi, Korean painter in the literary artist's style of the late Joseon period (born 1769)
