= 1776 in art =

Events from the year 1776 in art.

== Events ==
- John Robert Cozens sets out on a three-year tour of Switzerland and Italy.

== Works ==
- Nathaniel Dance-Holland – The Dashwoods at West Wycombe Park
- Joseph Duplessis – Portrait of Louis XVI
- Jean-Honoré Fragonard – A Young Girl Reading (approximate date)
- Thomas Gainsborough – Portrait of Johann Christian Bach
- William Hodges – A View of Cape Stephens in Cook's Straits with Waterspout
- Angelica Kauffman – Armida in Vain Endeavours with Her Entreaties to Prevent Rinaldo's Departure
- Edward Penny – Jane Shore Led in Penance to Saint Paul's
- Tilly Kettle – The ceremony of a gentoo woman taking leave of her relations and distributing her jewels prior to ascending the funeral pyre of her deceased husband
- Anton Raphael Mengs – Self-portrait
- Sir Joshua Reynolds
  - Portrait of Omai (completed circa)
  - Portrait of Wang-y-tong
- George Romney – Portrait of Richard Cumberland
- François-André Vincent – Belisarius
- Benjamin West
  - Helen Brought to Paris
  - The Sheridan Family

== Births ==
- February 16 – Abraham Raimbach, English engraver (died 1843)
- March 30 – Vasily Andreevich Tropinin, Russian painter (died 1857)
- April 2 – John Higton, English animal painter (died 1827)
- April 13 – Félix Boisselier, French historical painter (died 1811)
- June 11 – John Constable, English romantic landscape painter (died 1837)
- June 12 – Pierre Révoil, French painter (died 1842)
- June 29 – František Horčička, Czech history and portrait painter (died 1856)
- August 9 – Jacob Munch, Norwegian painter and military officer (died 1839)
- August 14 – Christian Friedrich Tieck, German sculptor (died 1851)
- August 15 – Gottlieb Schick, German Neoclassical portrait painter (died 1812)
- August 16 – Amalia von Helvig, German and Swedish artist, writer, translator and intellectual (died 1831)
- October 8 – Pieter van Os, Dutch painter and engraver (died 1839)
- October 18 – John Vanderlyn, American Neoclassical painter (died 1852)
- November 5 – Abraham Teerlink, Dutch painter (died 1857)
- December 26 – Charles Hamilton Smith, Flemish-born English illustrator and soldier (died 1859)
- date unknown
  - Élise Bruyère, French painter specializing in portraits and floral still lifes (died 1847)
  - Alexei Yegorov, Russian painter (died 1861)
  - Jan Mooy, Dutch marine art painter (died 1847)
  - Carlo Restallino, Italian painter and engraver (died 1864)
  - Gustava Johanna Stenborg, Swedish textile artist (died 1819)

== Deaths ==
- February 2 – Francis Hayman, painter and illustrator (born 1708)
- March 4 - Johann Georg Ziesenis, German-Danish portrait painter (born 1716)
- March 18 – Gerard Vandergucht, English born engraver and art dealer (born c.1696)
- April 1 – Gaetano Lapis, Italian painter (born 1704)
- May 4 – Jacques Saly, French sculptor (born 1717)
- July 29 – Charles Francois Hutin, French history and figure painter, engraver and sculptor (born 1715)
- August – Lorenzo Baldissera Tiepolo, painter (born 1736)
- September 22 – Giuseppe Peroni, Italian painter of frescoes (born 1700)
- date unknown
  - Vittorio Bigari, Italian painter (born 1692)
  - Angelica Le Gru Perotti, Italian painter (born 1719)
  - Thomas Pingo, medallist and engraver (born 1692)
  - Ike no Taiga, Japanese painter and calligrapher (born 1723)
  - Mattheus Verheyden, Dutch painter (born 1700)
