= The Expert =

The Expert or The Experts may refer to:

== Film and television ==
- The Expert (TV series), a 1968 British TV series
- The Expert (1932 film), an American film
- The Expert (1995 film), a film starring James Brolin
- The Experts (1973 film), a German film
- The Experts (1989 film), an American film
- The Experts (2024 film), a Malaysian film

== Other uses ==
- The Expert (album), a 2005 album by Taiwanese Mandopop artist Wilber Pan
- The Expert, a member of the Irish rapper-producer duo Messiah J and the Expert
- The Experts (painting), an 1837 painting by Alexandre-Gabriel Decamps

== See also ==
- Expert (disambiguation)
