= The Watering Place (Decamps) =

Painting by Alexandre-Gabriel Decamps

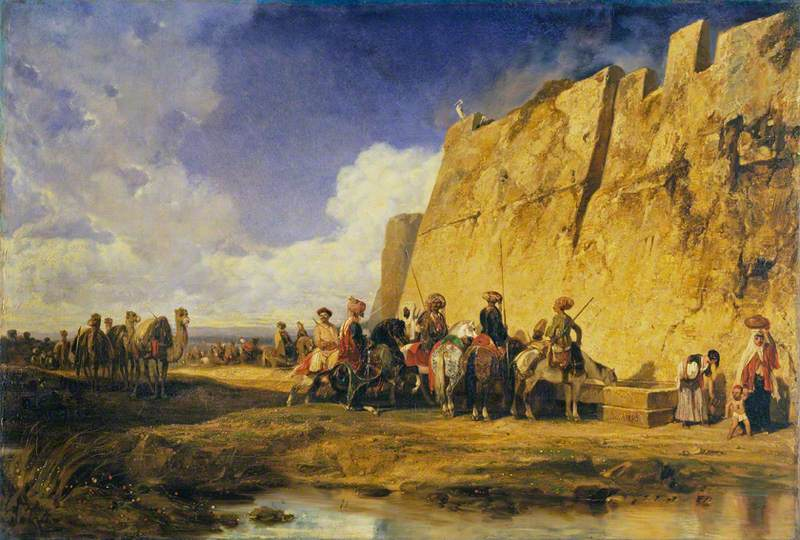
- Artist: Alexandre-Gabriel Decamps
- Year: 1832
- Type: Oil on canvas, landscape painting
- Dimensions: 79 cm × 116 cm (31 in × 46 in)
- Location: Wallace Collection, London

The Watering Place is an 1832 oil painting by the French artist Alexandre-Gabriel Decamps. A mixture of landscape and genre painting, it depicts a watering place in a scorching desert setting. Decamps was a member of the Romantic movement noted for his Orientalist works.

The painting featured at the Salon of 1833 held at the Louvre in Paris. Today it is in the Wallace Collection in London, having been acquired by the art collector Richard Seymour-Conway, 4th Marquess of Hertford in 1851. Another much later version of the scene by Decamps is now in the collection of Aberdeen Art Gallery.

== Bibliography ==
- Bell, Leonard. Colonial Constructs: European Images of Maori, 1840–1914. Auckland University Press, 2013.
- Ingamells, John. The Wallace Collection: French Nineteenth Century. Trustees of the Wallace Collection, 1985.
