= Frederik Ferdinand Friis =

Danish architect (1793–1865)

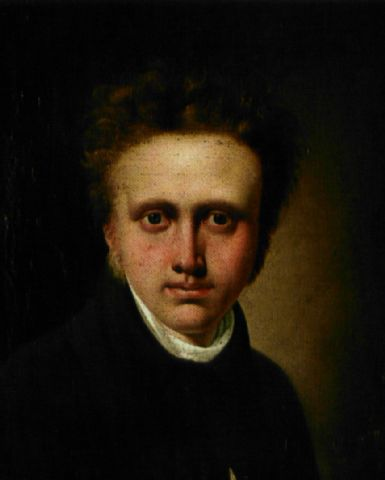
- Friis painted by Ferdinand Wolfgang Flachenecker
- Born: December 16, 1793; Copenhagen, Denmark
- Died: March 18, 1865 (aged 71); Copenhagen, Denmark
- Occupation: Architect
- Buildings: Horsens State Prison

Frederik Ferdinand Friis (16 December 1793 – 18 March 1865) was a Danish architect, professor and Royal Building Inspector. His most important work is the Horsens State Prison.

== Early life and education ==
Frederik Ferdinand Friis was born in Copenhagen on 16 December 1793 to master builder and fountain master Peder Friis and Henriette Johanne née West. He was admitted to the Royal Danish Academy of Fine Arts in 1814. He won small and large silver medals in 1815 and 1817, the small gold medal in 1821 for A military academy, and finally the large gold medal for A custom house in 1825.

He was articled to Peder Malling from 1822 to 1827 where he was responsible for the construction of the new main building for Sorø Academy after the old one had been destroyed in a fire.

== Rome and Bertel Thorvaldsen ==
In 1828, Friis travelled to Rome where he stayed until 1830. There he was received by Bertel Thorvaldsen, a friend of Friis' parents, and assisted Just Mathias Thiele who, in the late 1820s, was collecting material for his large four-volume Thorvaldsen biography. Friis interviewed Thorvaldsen about several details regarding his life and oeuvre and reported back to Thiele in Copenhagen.

Later, in 1839, Friis also became a member of the Thorvaldsen Museum Building Commission.

== Career ==
After his return to Denmark in 1831, Friis was appointed Royal Building Inspector of Zealand and in 1850 for Copenhagen, Frederiksborg, Holbæk and Bornholm counties.

== At the Academy ==
He became a member of the Art Academy in Copenhagen in 1833. A titular professor in 1852, he applied unsuccessfully for vacant positions as professor in 1855 and 1856. He was in residency at Charlottenborg from 1856 and was vice-director of the Art Academy from 1857.
