= Evdokim Alekseevich Egorov =

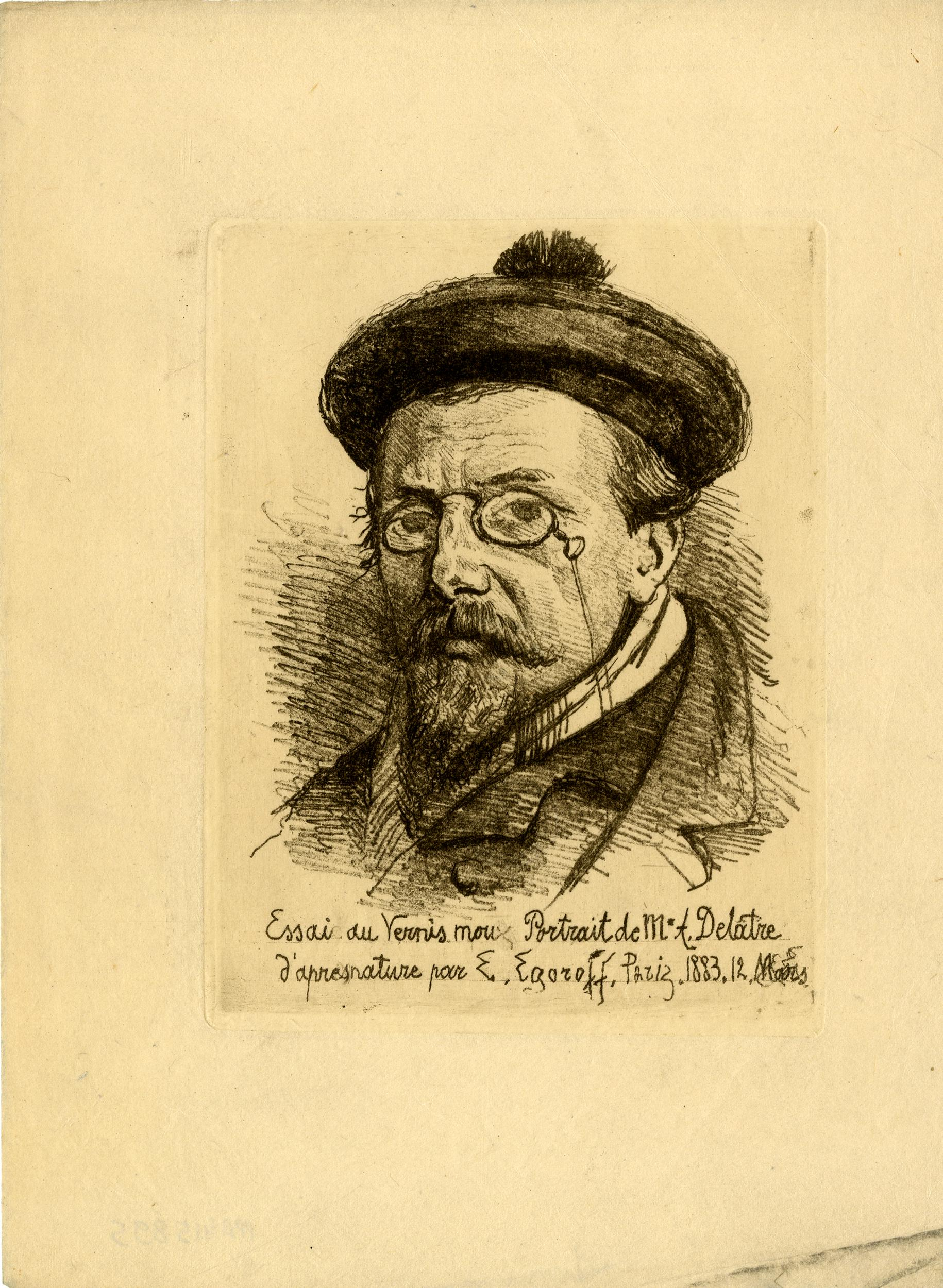
Portrait of Auguste Delâtre, 1883, by Evdokim Alekseevich Egorov

Evdokim Alekseevich Egorov (Russian: Евдоким Алексеевич Егоров; 1832 - 1891) was a Russian painter, porcelain painter, and etcher. He was the son of Alexei Yegorovich Yegorov.

== Biography ==
He was born in Saint Petersburg, the son of Alexei Yegorovich Yegorov and Vera Ivanovna Martos (1799 - 11 January 1856), daughter of the sculptor Ivan Martos.

He studied at the Imperial Academy of Saint Petersburg, and then became curator of the Moscow Museum. Later, in 1874, he moved to Paris.

He lived in Paris with his wife. From his arrival in Paris in 1874 through the 1880s he owned studios in Paris, working on "perfecting the craft and studying French techniques." Among his students was Yelena Polenova. Vasilii Dmitrievich and Ilya Repin also spent time in his studio.

He was keen on "fostering the ceramic arts, especially raising their prestige, and hoped to teach peasants the craft."

Russian academicians became interested in ceramics too, and in June 1876 Dmitry Grigorovich requested that the artists working with Egorov sent him examples of their work, wishing to improve Russian production.

Egorov died in Paris in 1891, having lived 17 years in the city.

It was said that he didn't reach his father's fame as a painter.

== Bibliography ==
- Proceedings of the Anglo-Russian Literary Society, No. 40, May, June, and July 1904, p. 27.

== Selected works ==
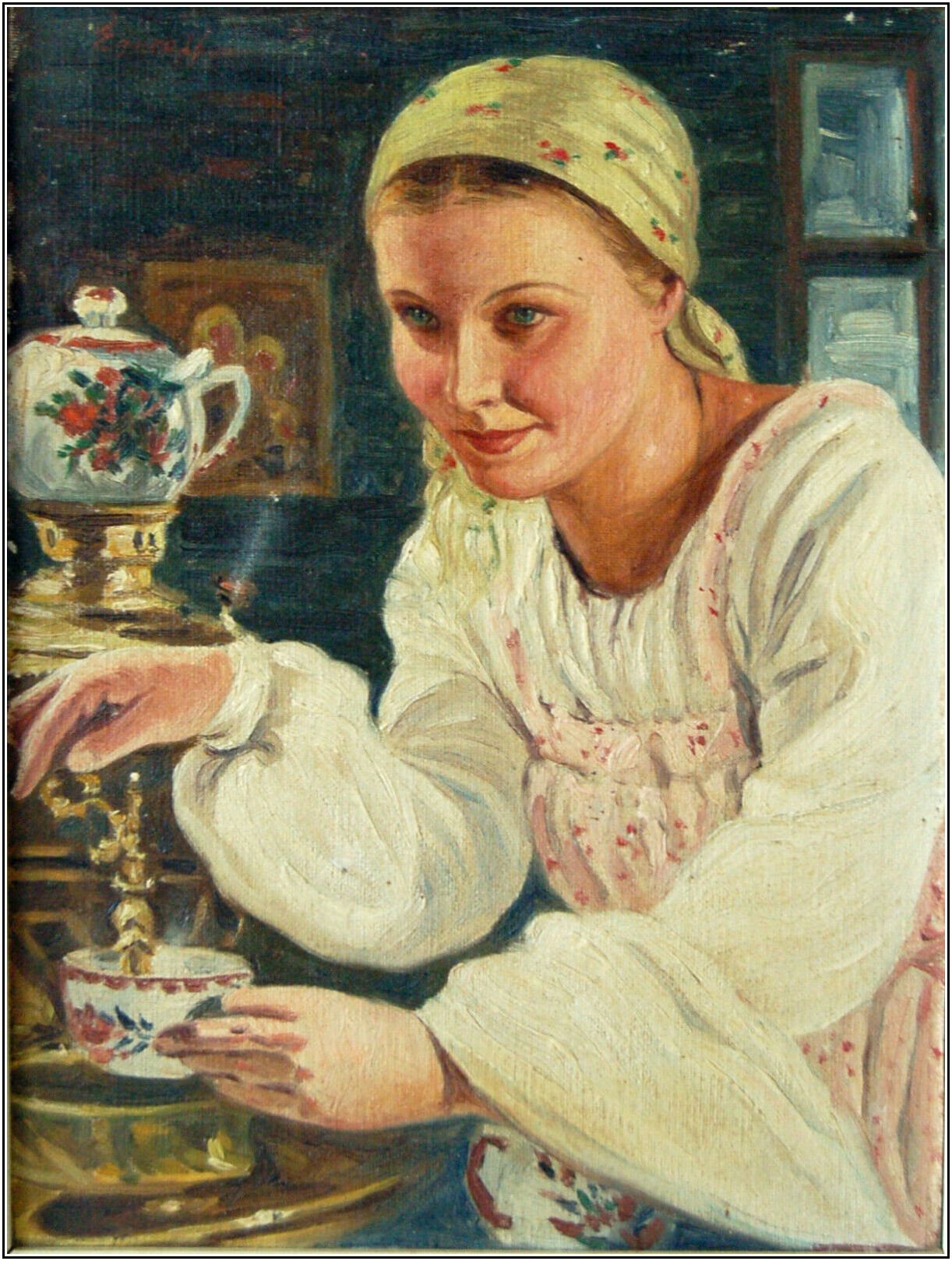
Female portrait with samovar, 1870-1880.

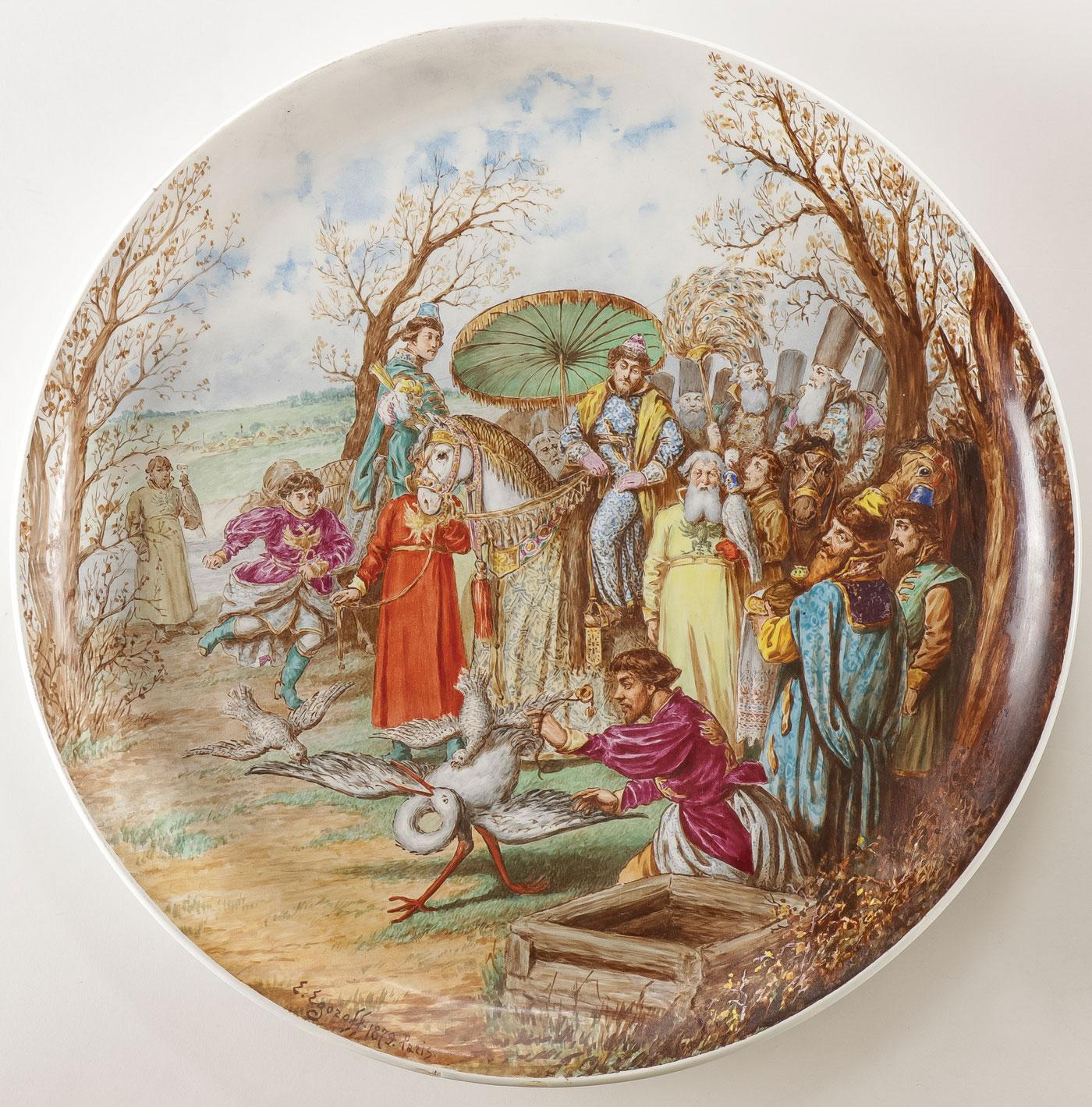
A Falconry Scene in Old Russian - 1879.

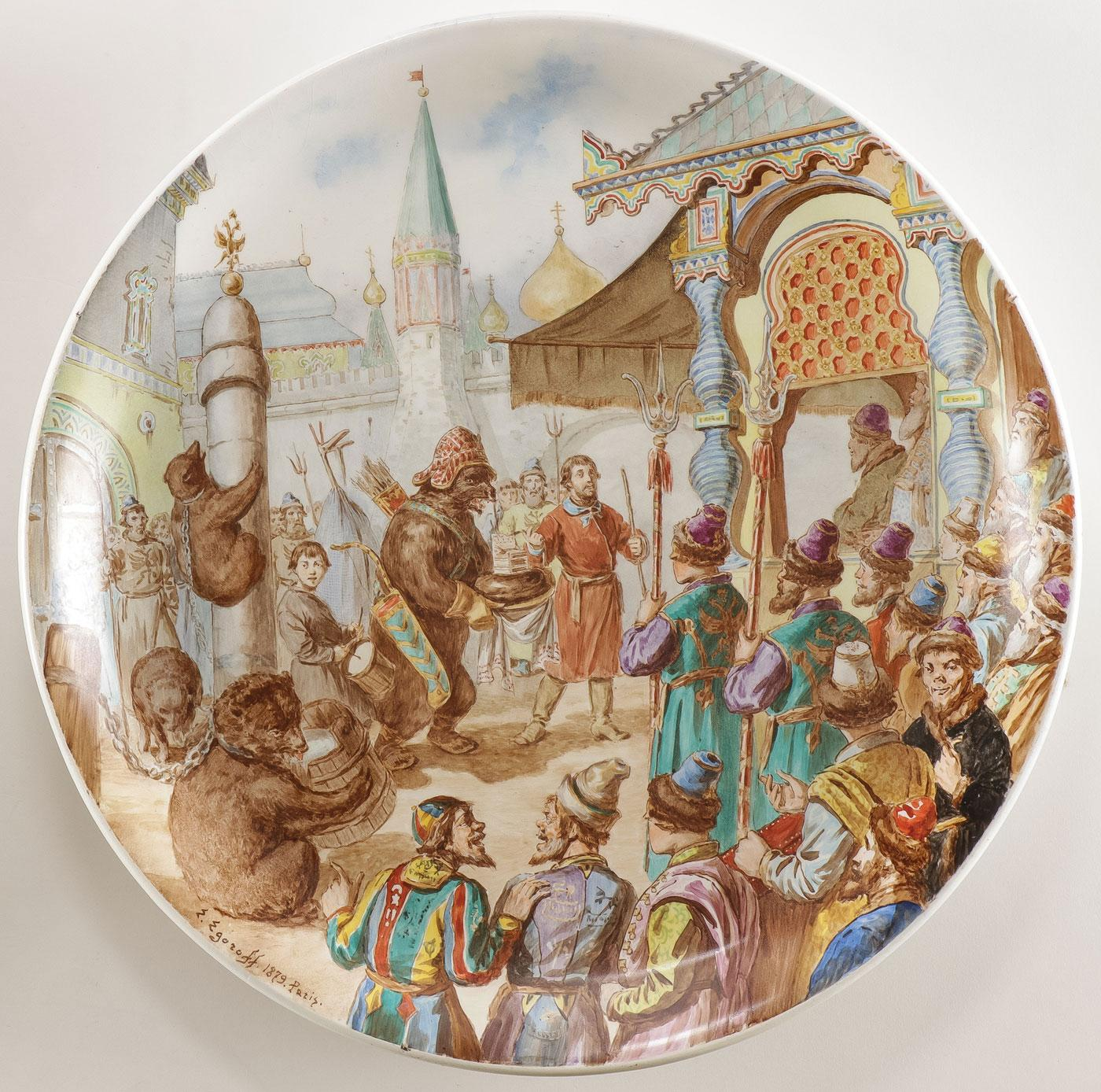
Tsar Fyodor I and the Bear - 1879.

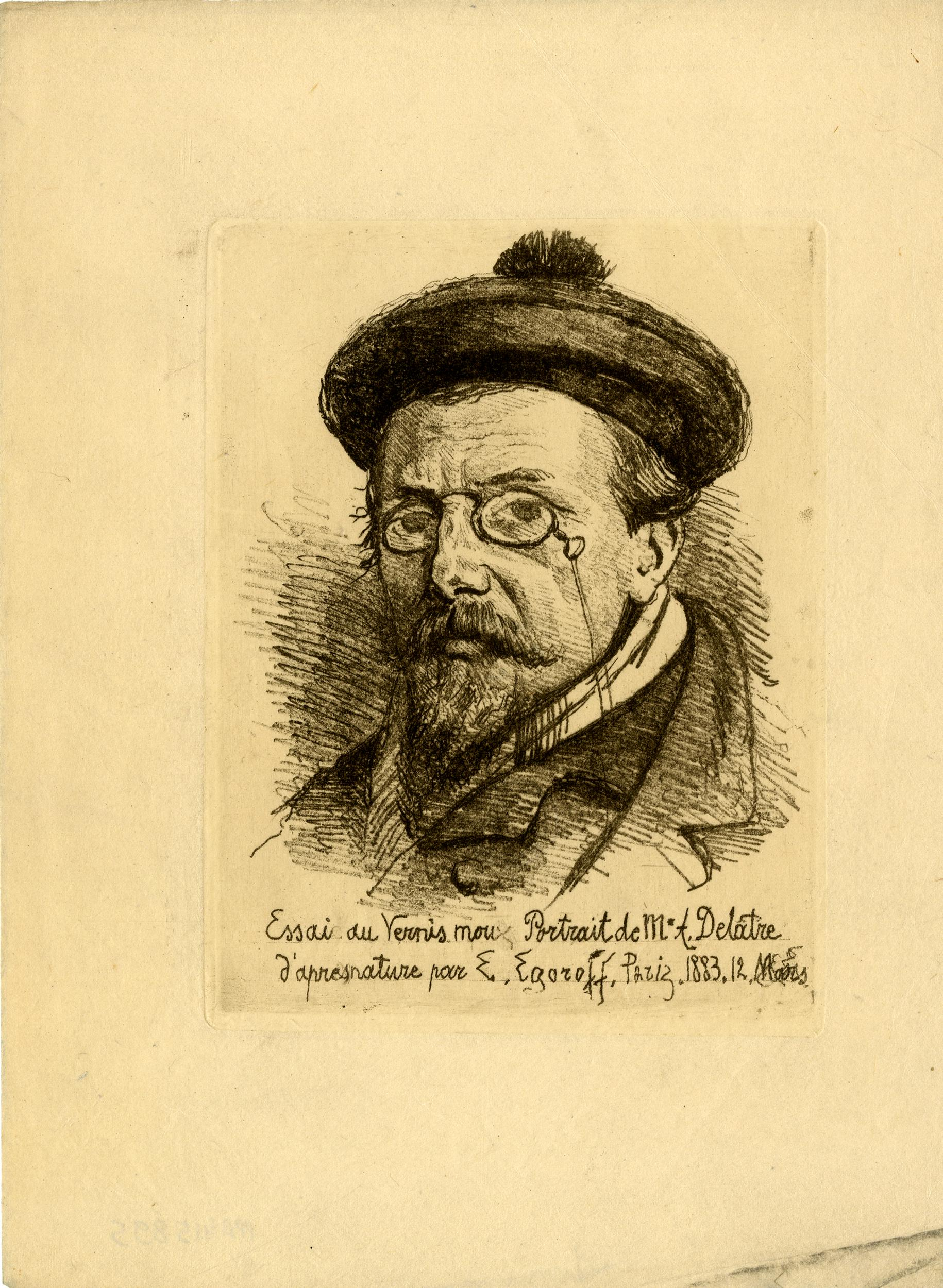
Portrait of Auguste Delâtre, 1883.
