= Expert (disambiguation) =

An expert is someone widely recognized as a reliable source of technique or skill.

Expert or EXPERT may also refer to:

== Science and technology ==
- Expert (company), a Swiss consumer electronics retail chain
- Gradiente Expert, the second and last MSX home computer launched in the Brazilian market
- European eXPErimental Re-entry Testbed (EXPERT), a European Space Agency research programme

== Other uses ==
- Expert (magazine), a Russian weekly business magazine
- Expert (video game), a 1996 Japanese video game
- Peugeot Expert, a model of light commercial vehicle

== See also ==
- The Expert (disambiguation)
- Expert system, in artificial intelligence
- Expert witness, a person whose opinion is accepted by the judge as an expert
- X-Perts, a video game
