= The Punishment of the Hooks =

Painting by Alexandre-Gabriel Decamps

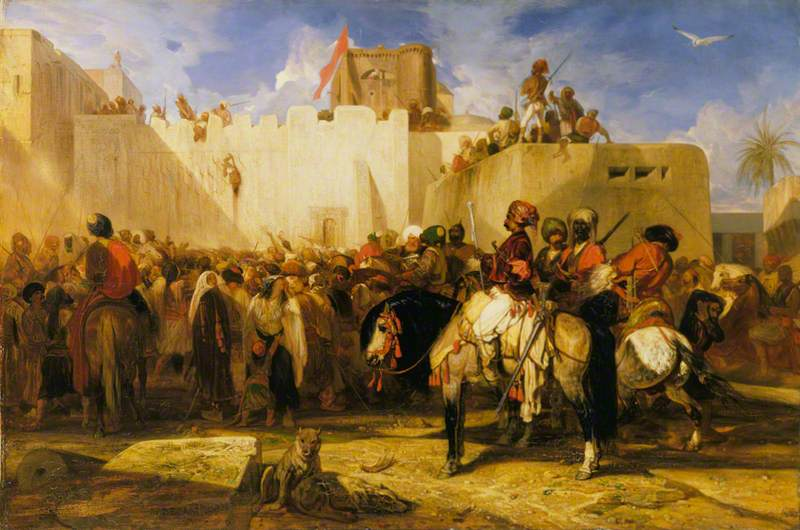
- Artist: Alexandre-Gabriel Decamps
- Year: 1837
- Type: Oil on canvas, genre painting
- Dimensions: 90 cm × 135.5 cm (35 in × 53.3 in)
- Location: Wallace Collection; London

The Punishment of the Hooks (French: Supplice des crochets) is an 1837 oil painting by the French artist Alexandre-Gabriel Decamps. A genre painting, it shows criminals being dangled off the battlements of a fortress onto metal hooks below.

The painting reflects the fashionable Orientalism of the era, although it is unclear if Decamps himself witness such an incident during his tour of the Middle East and North Africa in 1828. Decamps was a noted member of the Romantic movement. The painting was exhibited at the Salon of 1839 held at the Louvre in Paris. It became one his best-known works although the art critic Charles Blanc described it as "an incomparable image of Musulman barbarity". It was acquired by the British art collector the Marquess of Hertford, and now forms part of the Wallace Collection in London.

== Bibliography ==
- Cass, David B. & Floss, Michael M. Alexandre Gabriel Decamps, 1803-1860. Clark Art Institute, 1984.
- Ingamells, John. The Wallace Collection: French Nineteenth Century. Trustees of the Wallace Collection, 1985.
- Olmsted, Jennifer, Delacroix’s Moroccans: Art and Masculinity. Penn State University Press, 2025.
- Trapp, Frank. The Attainment of Delacroix. Johns Hopkins Press, 1970.
