= Edinburgh from the Calton Hill =

Painting by David Roberts

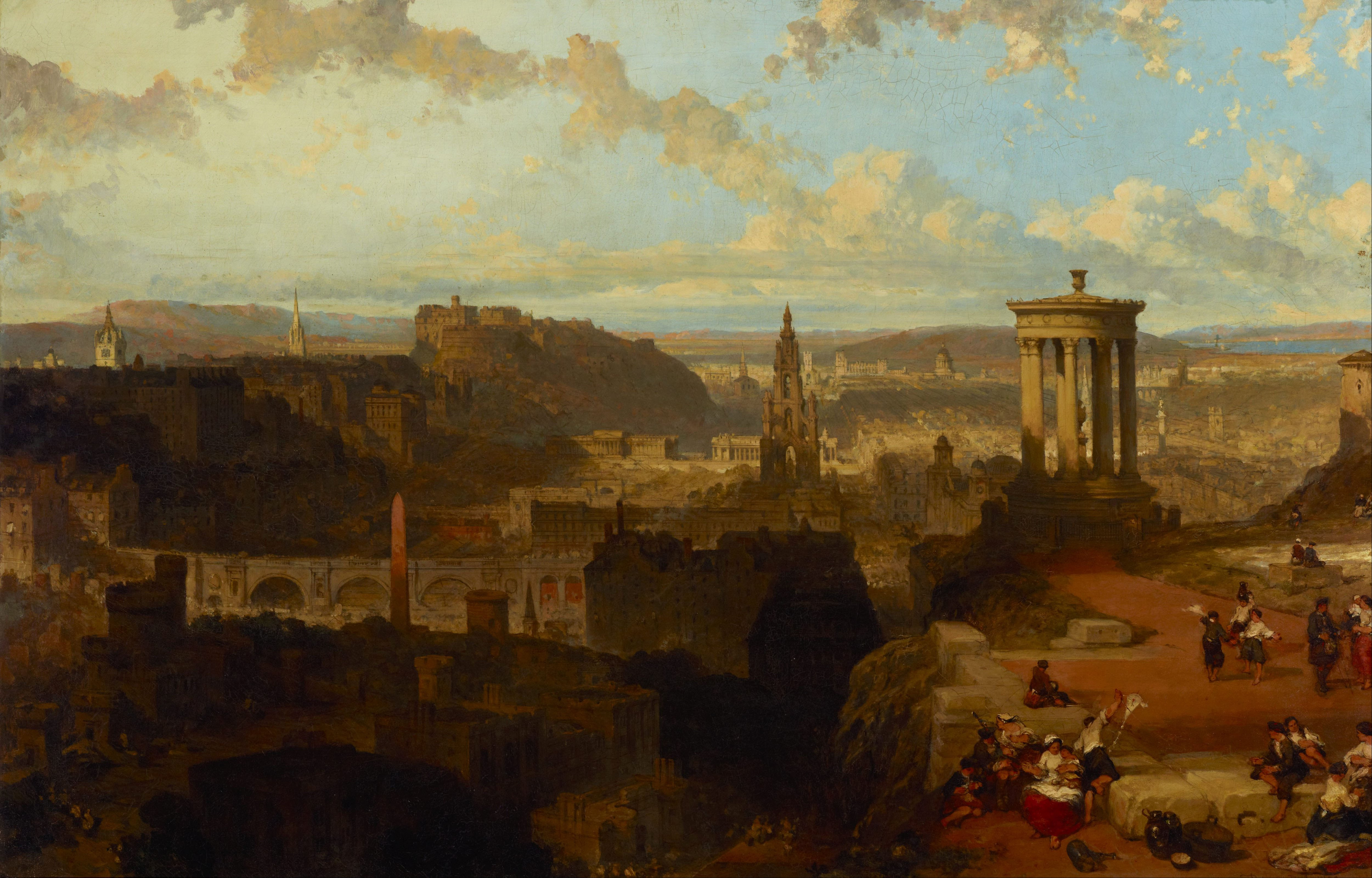
- Artist: David Roberts
- Year: 1858
- Type: Oil on canvas, landscape painting
- Dimensions: 98.4 cm × 151.6 cm (38.7 in × 59.7 in)
- Location: Art Gallery of New South Wales, Sydney

Edinburgh from the Calton Hill is an 1858 landscape painting by the British artist David Roberts. A cityscape it depicts a panoramic view of Edinburgh from Calton Hill. Roberts was born in Stockbridge, then just outside the city but spent much of his career in London and overseas becoming known for his Orientalist views of the Middle East. Roberts returned for a visit with his friend and fellow artist Clarkson Stanfield, providing the inspiration for this depiction of his native city. Today the painting is in the collection of the Art Gallery of New South Wales in Sydney, having been acquired in 1890.

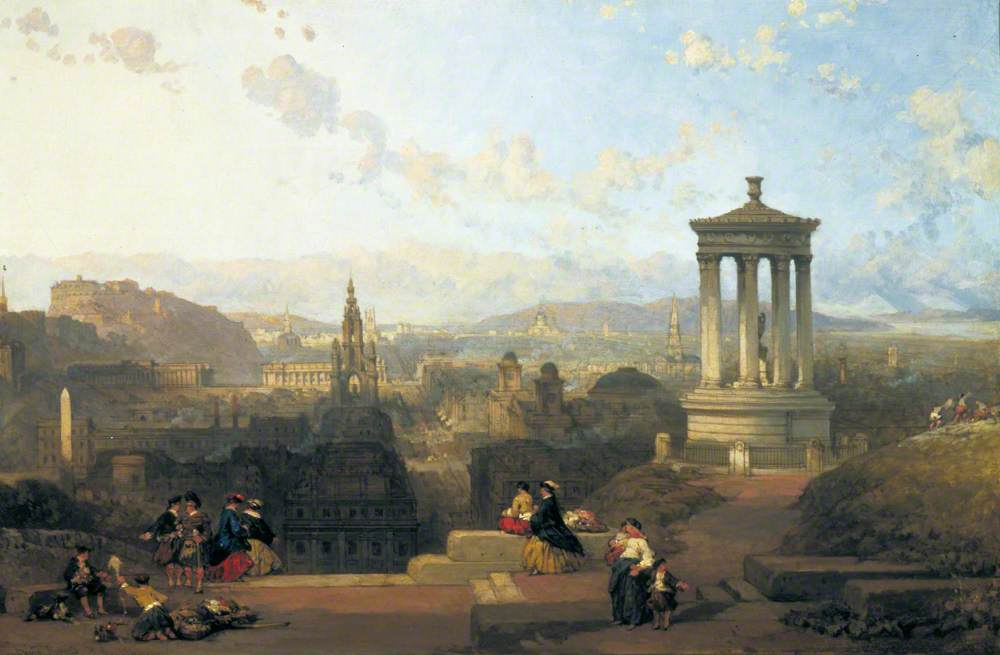
Version in the Guildhall Art Gallery, 1863

A different version of the same view by Roberts, produced in 1863, is now in the collection of the Guildhall Art Gallery in London.

== See also ==
- Edinburgh from the Castle, an 1847 painting by Roberts

== Bibliography ==
- Burritt, Amanda M. Visualising Britain's Holy Land in the Nineteenth Century. Springer Nature, 2020.
- Roe, Sonia & Hardy, Pat. Oil Paintings in Public Ownership in the City of London. Public Catalogue Foundation, 2009.
- Sim, Katherine. David Roberts R.A., 1796–1864: A Biography. Quartet Books, 1984.
