= The Anchorage of Smyrna =

Painting by Alexandre-Gabriel Decamps

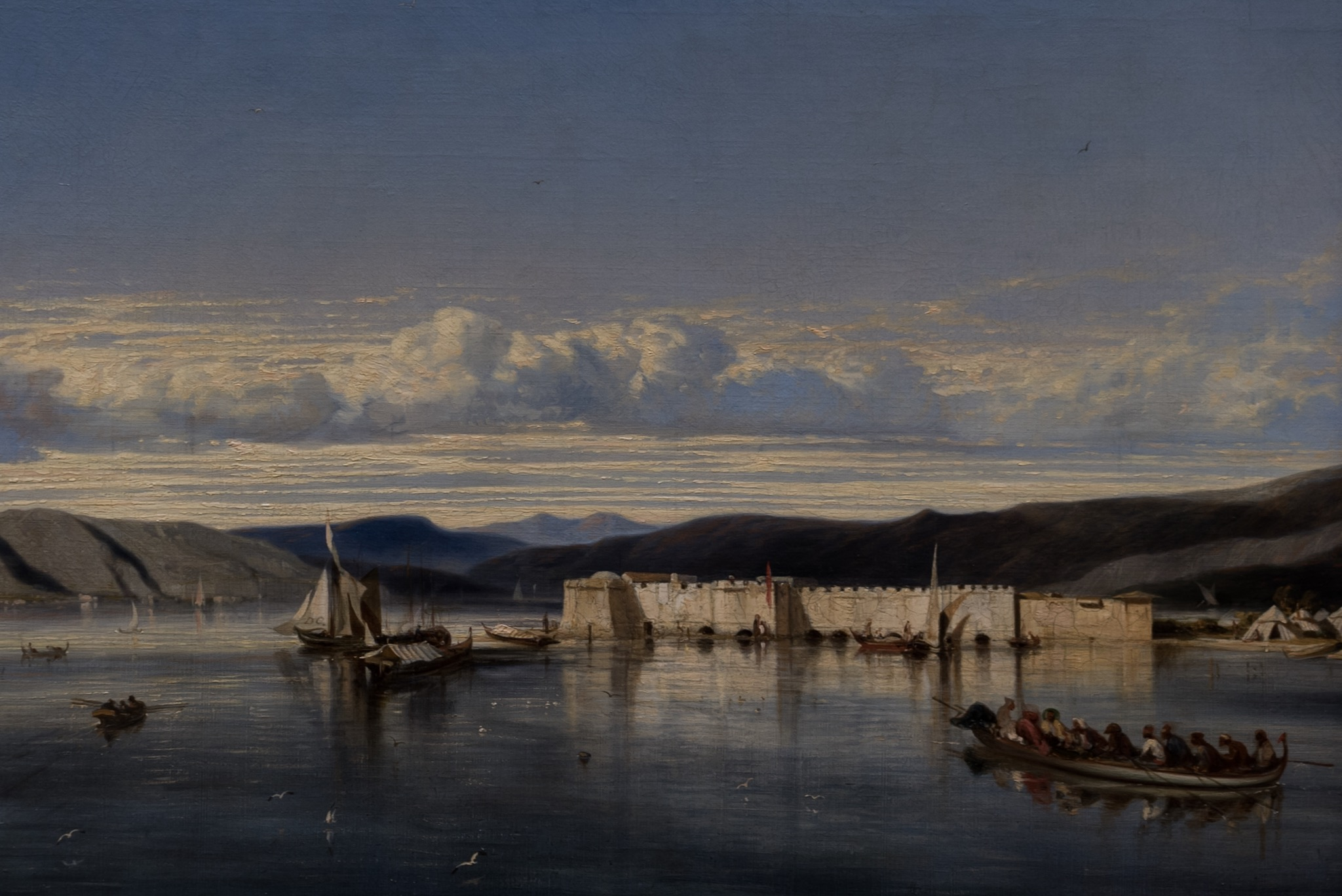
- Artist: Alexandre-Gabriel Decamps
- Year: 1847
- Type: Oil on canvas, landscape painting
- Dimensions: 46.8 cm × 68 cm (18.4 in × 27 in)
- Location: Wallace Collection, London

The Anchorage of Smyrna (French: Le mouillage de Smyrne) is a c.1847 oil painting by the French artist Alexandre-Gabriel Decamps. It depicts the harbour at Smyrna, a major port in the Ottoman Empire. He had visited the city whule travelling extensively through the Middle East in 1828. Part of the Romantic movement, Decamps was known for his Orientalist paintings.

He was given his own dedicated section at the Salon of 1855 in Paris, one of four artists to be awarded it. The painting was acquired by the Francophile Marquess of Hertford in 1858. Since 1897 it has been part of the Wallace Collection in London.

== Bibliography ==
- Cass, David B. & Floss, Michael M. Alexandre Gabriel Decamps, 1803-1860. Clark Art Institute, 1984.
- Ingamells, John. The Wallace Collection: French Nineteenth Century. Trustees of the Wallace Collection, 1985.
