= Edinburgh from the Castle =

Painting by David Roberts

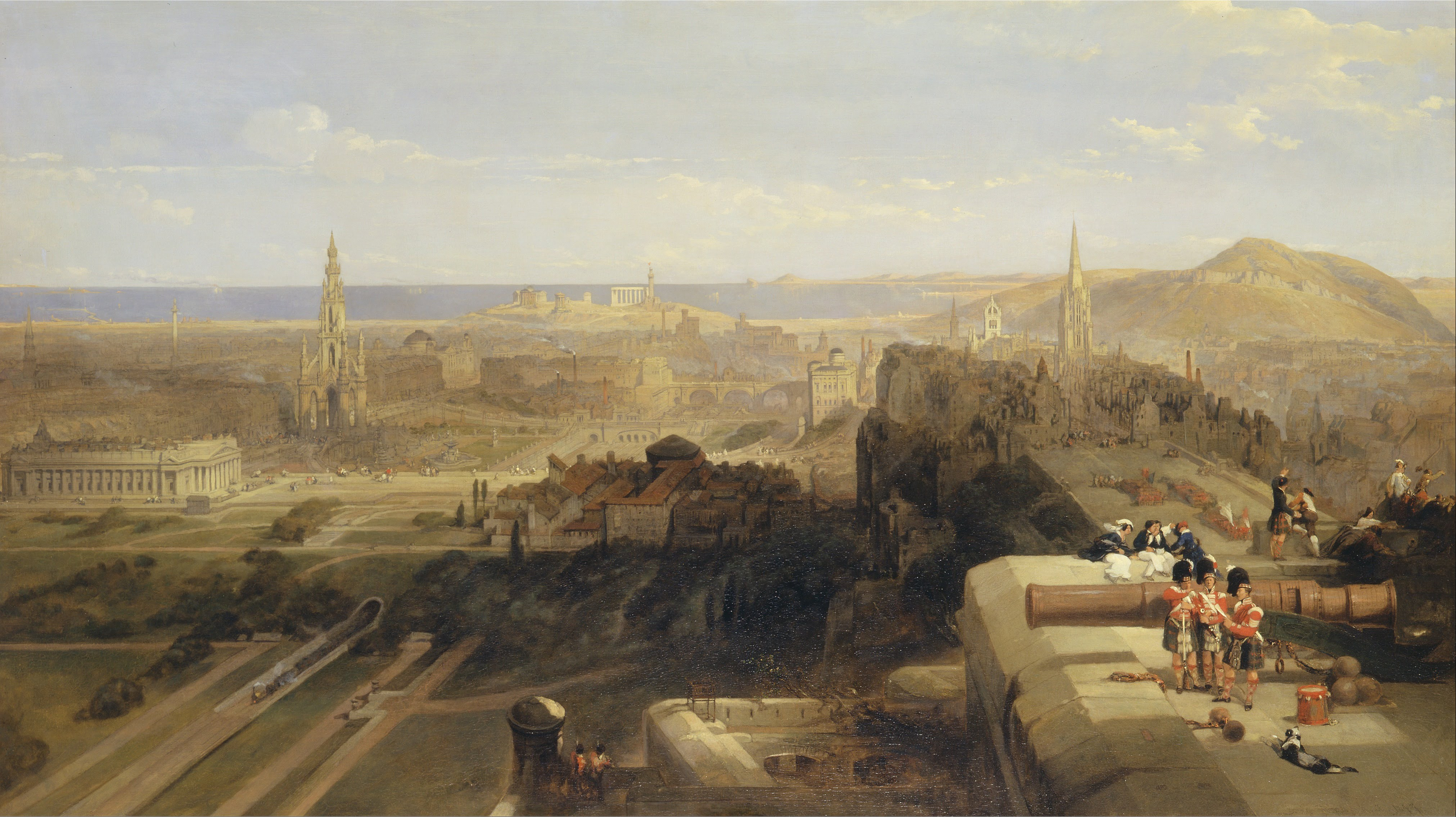
- Artist: David Roberts
- Year: 1847
- Type: Oil on canvas, landscape painting
- Dimensions: 121.9 cm × 213.4 cm (48.0 in × 84.0 in)
- Location: Yale Center for British Art, New Haven

Edinburgh from the Castle is an 1847 landscape painting by the British artist David Roberts. A cityscape it features a panoramic view of the city of Edinburgh seen from the top of Castle Rock. It includes various landmarks of the city such as the Scott Monument and Royal Instition with the well-lit Georgian New Town to the left and the more shadowy Old Town on the right divided by a railway line on which a steam train is visible. Highland soldiers were based on a calotype by David Octavius Hill and Robert Adamson.

The painting was displayed at the Royal Academy Exhibition of 1847 held at the National Gallery in London. It was praised for its accurate depiction of the city, with one critic suggesting viewers were presented with“the most complete representation of the most picturesque city in the world"and the effect was "as if they had visited the city itself by railway".

Roberts was himself from Stockbridge in Edinburgh and had made his name for his Romantic landscapes and Orientalist depictions of the Middle East. Today the painting is in the Yale Center for British Art in Connecticut as part of the Paul Mellon Collection. In 1858 he produced a different view of the city Edinburgh from the Calton Hill.

== Bibliography ==
- Sim, Katherine. David Roberts R.A., 1796–1864: A Biography. Quartet Books, 1984.
- Stevenson, Sara. David Octavius Hill and Robert Adamson. National Galleries of Scotland, 1981.
