= The South Sea Bubble =

Painting by Edward Matthew Ward

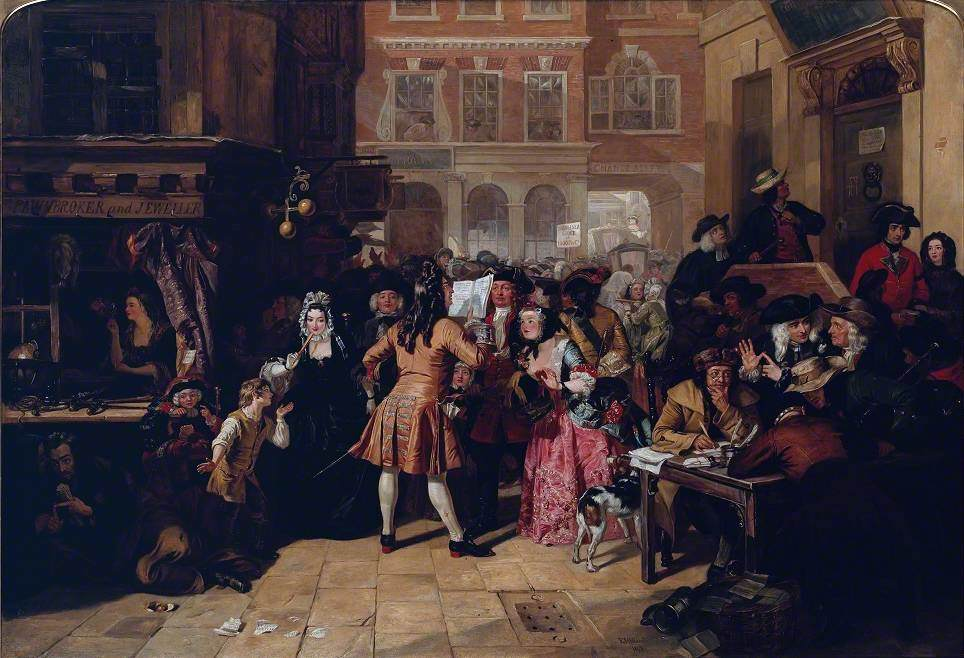
- Artist: Edward Matthew Ward
- Year: 1847
- Type: Oil on canvas, history painting
- Dimensions: 129.5 cm × 188 cm (51.0 in × 74 in)
- Location: Tate Britain, London

The South Sea Bubble, a Scene in 'Change Alley in 1720 is an oil on canvas history painting by the British artist Edward Matthew Ward, from 1847.

== History and description ==
It depicts a scene in Exchange Alley in the City of London when the South Sea Bubble was at its height in 1720 shortly before the company's dramatic collapse. It was a centre of financial speculation and Ward depicts it in a Hogarthian manner.

Ward had been one of the members of The Clique, a group of artists including William Powell Frith, John Phillip and Henry Nelson O'Neil. Although it was painted more than a century after the evens of the South Sea Bubble, it came shortly after the Railway Mania of the 1840s.

It was exhibited at the Royal Academy's Summer Exhibition of 1847. It was donated to the National Gallery by the art collector Robert Vernon as part of the Vernon Gift. Today it is in the collection of Tate Britain.

== Bibliography ==
- Dafforne, James. The Life and Works of Edward Matthew Ward. Virtue and Company, 1879.
- Thomas, Julia. Pictorial Victorians: The Inscription of Values in Word and Image. Ohio University Press, 2004.
- Ziemba, William T., Zhitlukhin, Mikhail & Lleo, Sebastien . Stock Market Crashes: Predictable And Unpredictable And What To Do About Them. World Scientific, 2017.
