= Alfred Inciting the Saxons to Prevent the Landing of the Danes =

Painting by George Frederic Watts

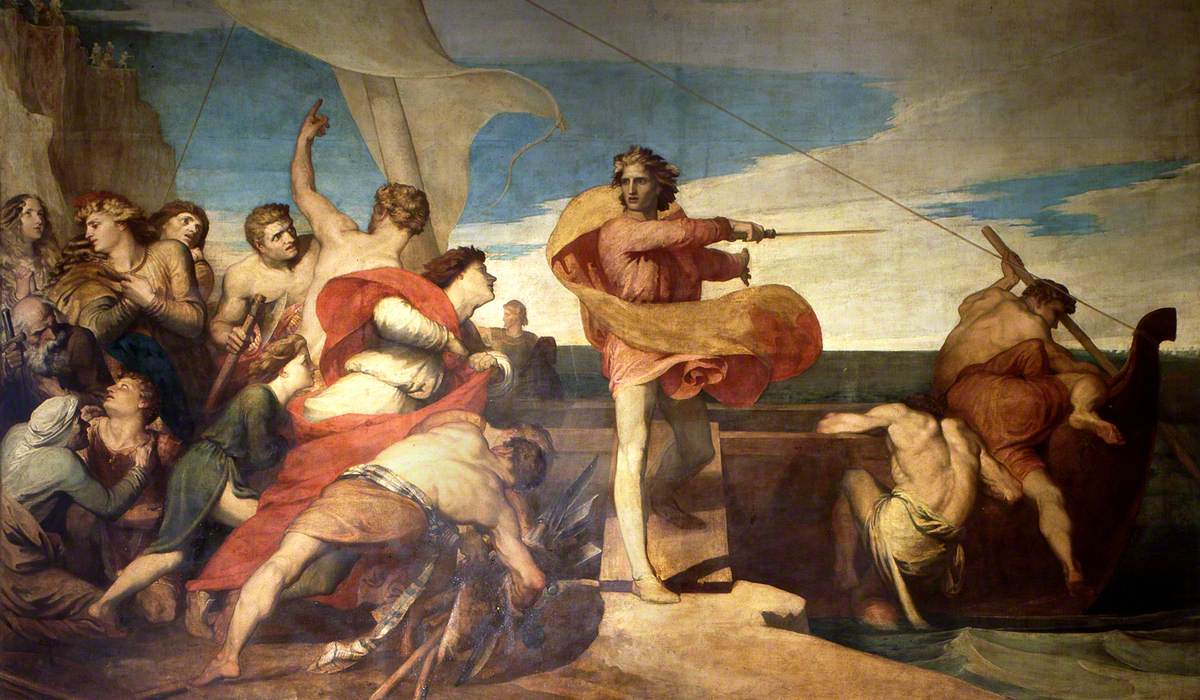
- Artist: George Frederic Watts
- Year: 1847
- Type: Oil on canvas, history painting
- Dimensions: 342.9 cm × 579.1 cm (135.0 in × 228.0 in)
- Location: Houses of Parliament, London

Alfred Inciting the Saxons to Prevent the Landing of the Danes is an 1847 history painting by the British artist George Frederic Watts. It depicts a moment from early English history in 876. Alfred the Great is shown encouraging his Anglo-Saxon forces to defy the Great Heathen Army and thwart a landing by the enemy Depicted as a Napoleonic figure, the painting was like intended to recall more recent victories of the Royal Navy. Watts stated his choice of subject was "dedicated to patriotism and posterity".

Watts produced the work for the 1847 competition being held for oil paintings to decorate the new Houses of Parliament, which has been rebuilt following the major fire of 1834. Watts was based in Italy at the time and produced over 200 drawings in preparation for the large work. It was shipped to England where it was one of three paintings to win the £500 premium. On the recommendation of Charles Lock Eastlake the future President of the Royal Academy it was purchased to hang in the committee rooms of Parliament. It remains in the Parliamentary Art Collection today.

== Bibliography ==
- Niles, John D. The Idea of Anglo-Saxon England 1066-1901:Remembering, Forgetting, Deciphering, and Renewing the Past. Wiley, 2015.
- Strong, Roy. Painting the Past: The Victorian Painter and British History. Pimlico, 2004.
