= The Experts (painting) =

Painting by Alexandre-Gabriel Decamps

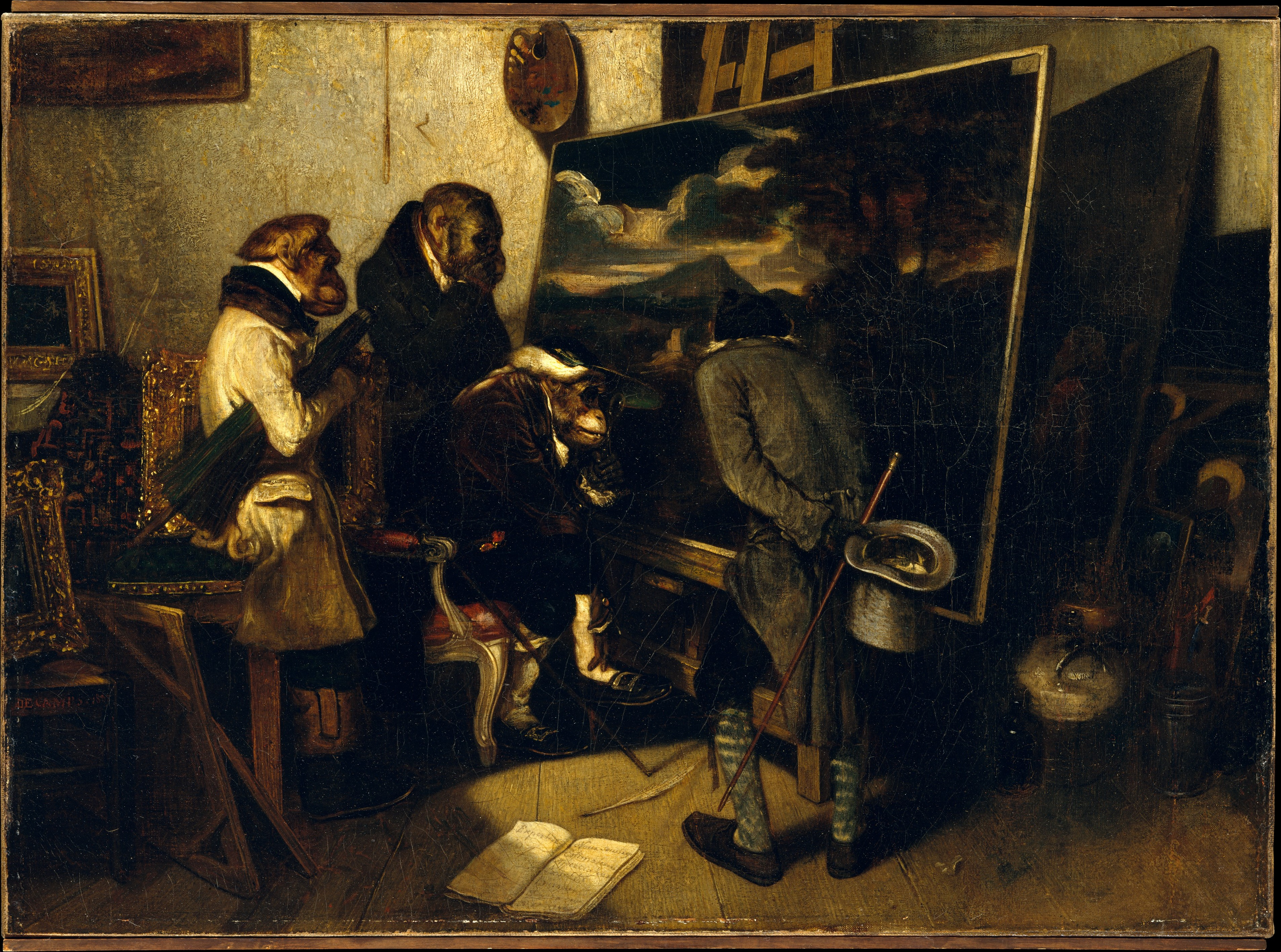
- Artist: Alexandre-Gabriel Decamps
- Year: 1837
- Medium: Oil on canvas
- Dimensions: 46.4 cm × 64.1 cm (18.3 in × 25.2 in)
- Location: Metropolitan Museum of Art, New York

The Experts is an early 19th-century painting by French artist Alexandre-Gabriel Decamps. Done in oil on canvas, the painting depicts a group of chimpanzees examining a painting. Decamps intended The Experts to be a work of satire; the apes are dressed in the attire (Singerie) of French gentlemen, and are representative of art critics. The painting the group is examining is a landscape by Nicolas Poussin, a 17th-century French painter. Decamps' work, which was originally shown at the Paris Salon of 1839, is on display at the Metropolitan Museum of Art. It also featured at the Salon of 1855, having been lent by its often the British art collector Lord Henry Seymour-Conway.
