= Ferdinand Wolfgang Flachenecker =

German painter

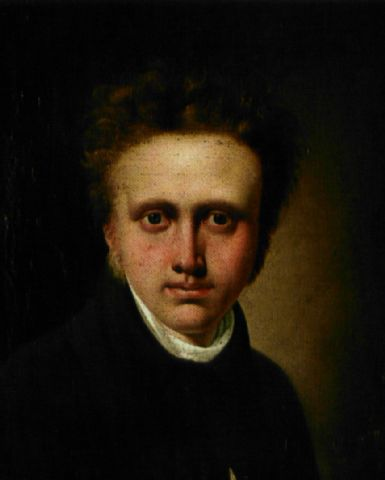
Portrait of the Danish architect Frederik Ferdinand Friis by Ferdinand Wolfgang Flachenecker, 1830

Ferdinand Wolfgang Flachenecker (1792–1847) was a 19th-century German painter.

== Biography ==
Ferdinand Wolfgang Flachenecker was born in the Holy Roman Empire in 1792. He worked as a painter and lithographer. He studied at the Royal Danish Academy of Fine Arts in Copenhagen. Later he settled in Munich.

== See also ==
- List of German painters
