= Helen Brought to Paris =

Painting by Benjamin West

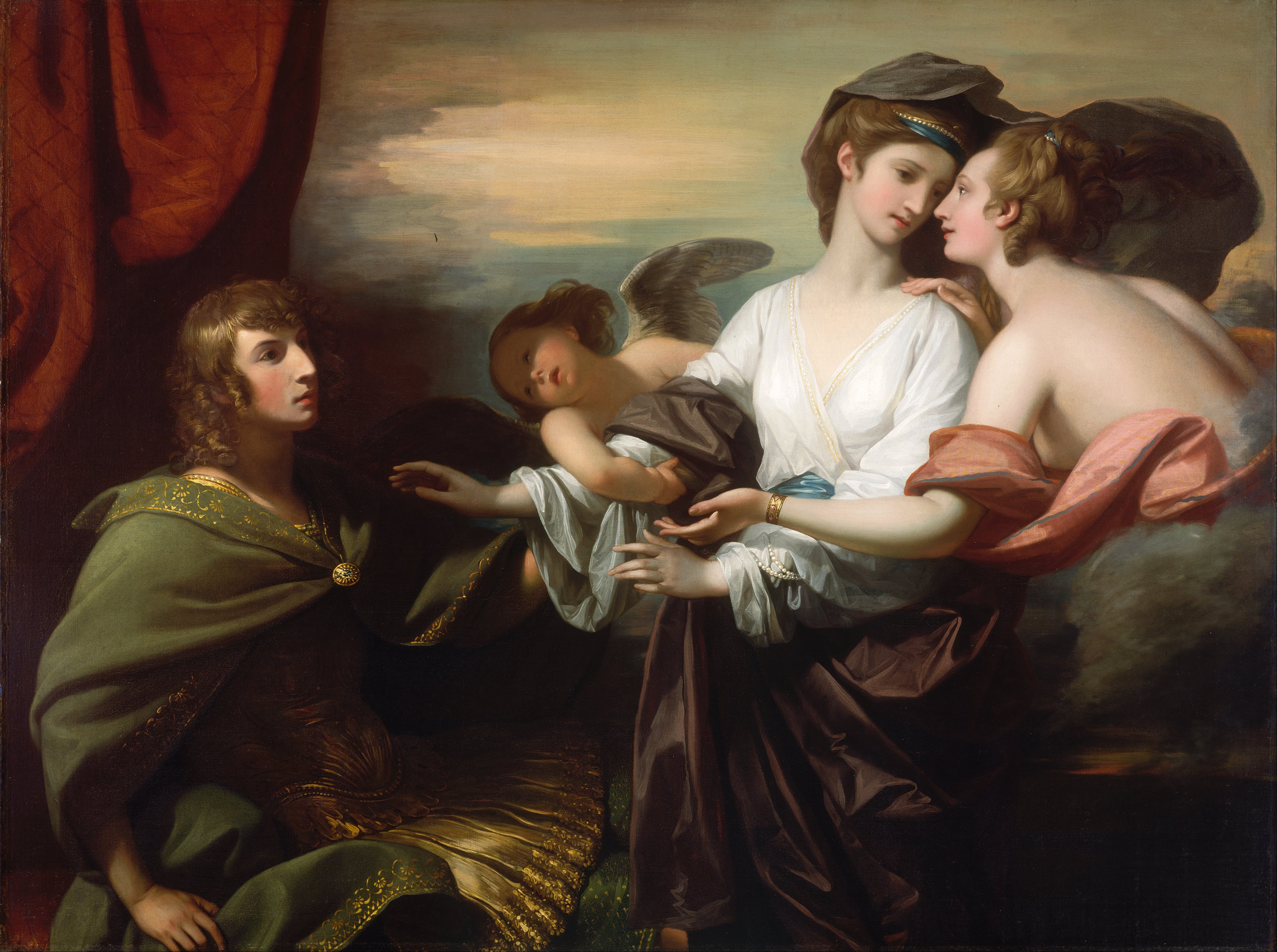
- Artist: Benjamin West
- Year: 1776
- Type: Oil on canvas, history painting
- Dimensions: 143.3 cm × 198.3 cm (56.41 in × 78.07 in)
- Location: Smithsonian American Art Museum; Washington D.C.

Helen Brought to Paris is a 1776 neoclassical history painting by the Anglo-American artist Benjamin West. It depicts the Judgement of Paris from Greek Mythology in which Paris selected Aphrodite as the fairest of the three Goddesses. It shows Helen of Troy being brought to Paris by Aphrodite and her son Cupid.

West was a Pennsylvania painter who settled in London in the 1760s and went on to become the president of the Royal Academy. He was known for his history scenes, both from the classical era and more recent settings such as The Death of General Wolfe.

Parallels have been drawn to the fact that Paris's choice of Helen ultimately led to the Trojan War and the ongoing crisis with regards to the Thirteen Colonies. West had ambivalent feelings about the conflict due to his close relationship to his patron George III and his origins in America. Today the painting is in the collection of the Smithsonian American Art Museum in Washington D.C.

== Bibliography ==
- Grossman, Lloyd. Benjamin West and the Struggle to be Modern. Merrell Publishers, 2015.
- Kloss, William. Treasures from the National Museum of American Art. National Museum of American Art, 2024.
- Taylor, Joshua. The Fine Arts in America. University of Chicago Press, 1981.
