= Alexei Yegorovich Yegorov =

Russian painter and draftsman

- Алексей Егорович Егоров
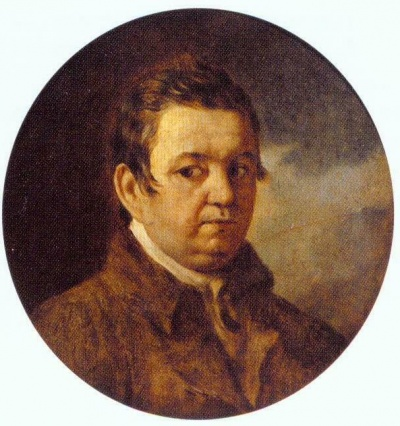
- Self-Portrait, late 1830s, oil on canvas; Tretyakov Gallery, Moscow
- Born: c. 1776
- Died: September 10, 1851 (aged 74–75); Saint Petersburg
- Resting place: Tikhvin Cemetery, St. Petersburg
- Education: Imperial Academy of Arts (1797)
- Known for: Painting
- Spouse: Vera Martos (m. 1815)
- Elected: Member Academy of Arts (1807)

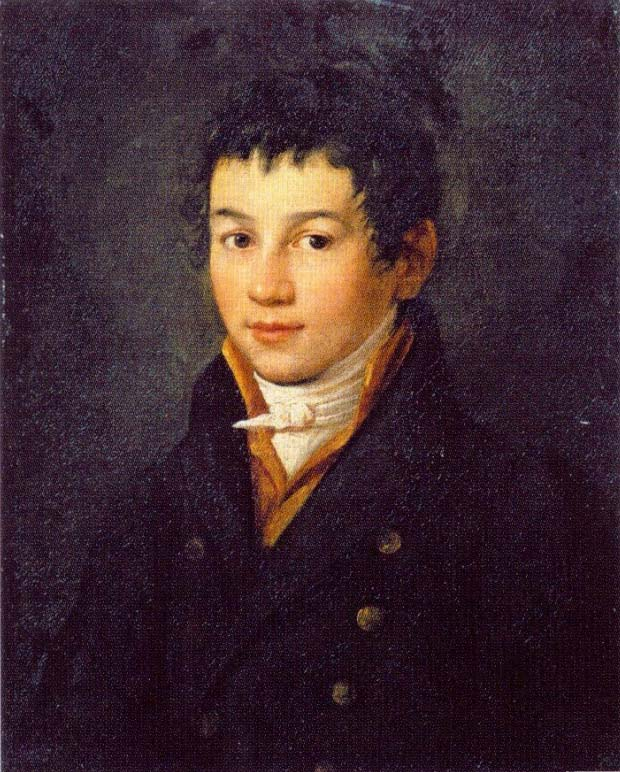
Self-portrait in adolescence (late 1790s)

Alexei Yegorovich Yegorov (Russian: Алексе́й Его́рович Его́ров; c. 1776 - 22 September 1851, Saint Petersburg) was a Russian painter and draughtsman in the Neo-Classical style, active in St. Petersburg during Tsars Alexander I and Nicholas I's reigns, best known for history paintings.

== Biography ==
He was taken captive by Cossacks as a young child and later placed in the Moscow Orphanage. Little was ever learned of his origins although, based on some of his early memories, he was believed to be of Kalmyk descent.

In 1782, he was enrolled at the Imperial Academy of Arts, where he studied with Ivan Akimov and Grigory Ugryumov. He graduated in 1797 and became an academician in 1803, following which he was sent to do field work in Rome and came under the influence of Vincenzo Camuccini, who praised the simplicity of his design and coloring. Larger than the average Italian, he was nicknamed the "Russian Bear". It was rumored that people would buy his paintings for the number of gold coins that could be laid on the principal figure, and that Pope Pius VII had asked him to remain as a court painter, but he politely refused the offer.

In 1807, he returned to Saint Petersburg and became an assistant professor at the Academy. He also gave private drawing lessons to Elizabeth Alexeievna and Alexander I, who gave him a nickname, "The Renowned" (знаменитого), after he completed a fresco with over a hundred figures ("World Prosperity") at Tsarskoye Selo in only 28 days. As a man of deep faith, he always considered his religious paintings to be his most important work, although he reluctantly produced portraits of many people in the nobility. His wife's father was the sculptor Ivan Martos.

As a teacher, he tried to be a friend as well as a mentor and rarely spoke in the curt manner usually associated with instructors at that time. As a father, he refused to give his daughters an education and was very critical of their suitors, kicking one out of the house as a suspected Freemason, simply because of the way he crossed his knife and fork.

In 1840, he was summarily dismissed by Tsar Nicholas I, who was displeased with images of the Holy Trinity he had painted for Catherine's Cathedral. He was, however, given 1,000 Rubles per year as a pension. Despite becoming disconnected from the Academy, his former students still came to him for guidance, eliciting his opinions of their new works and bringing their students for advice. As a result, he was able to keep busy for the rest of his life. It is reported, however, that he became increasingly stingy, suspicious and generally odd. His last words were, "My candle burned out...".

He was the father of artist Evdokim Alekseevich Egorov.

== Selected paintings ==
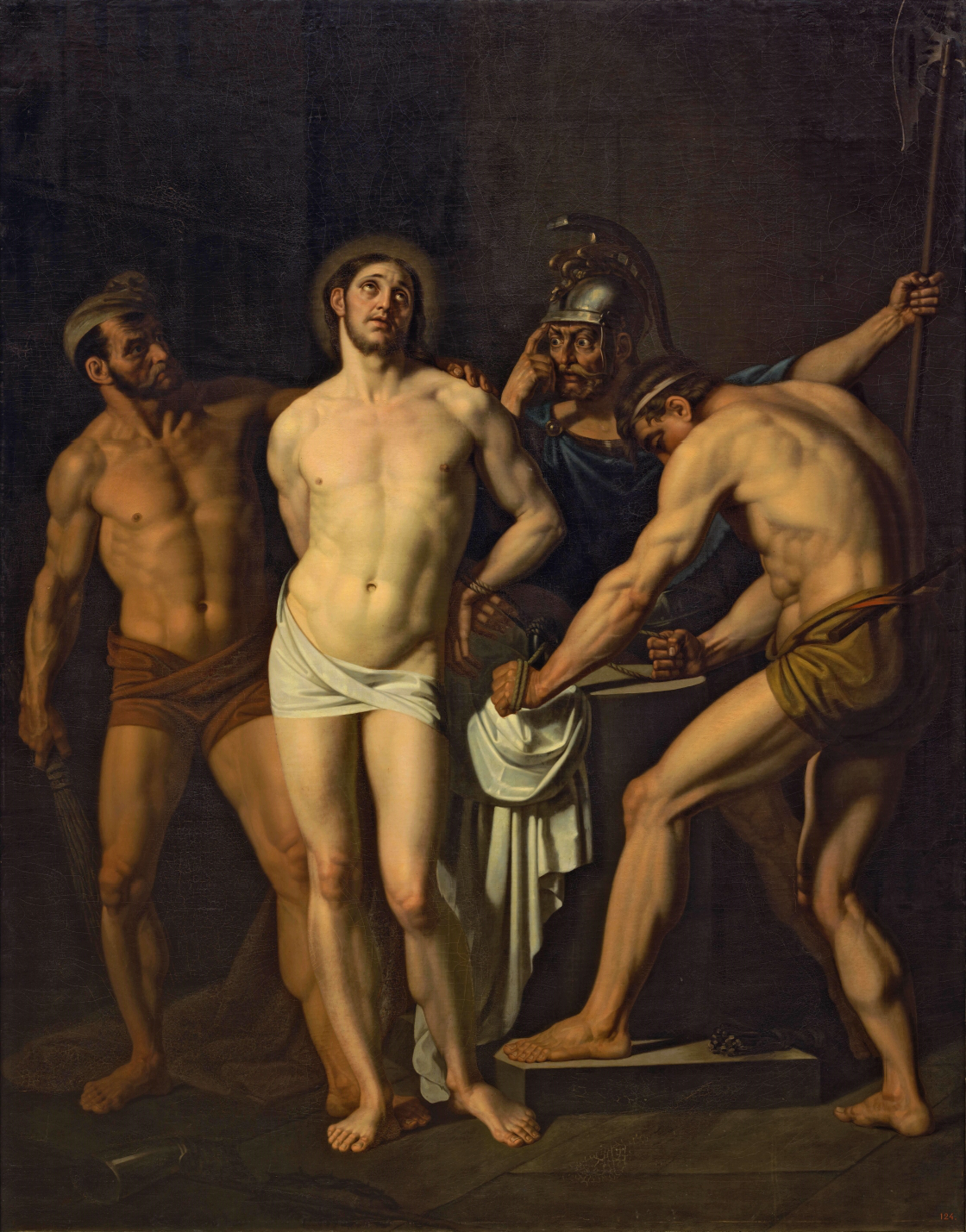
The Flagellation of Christ, 1814

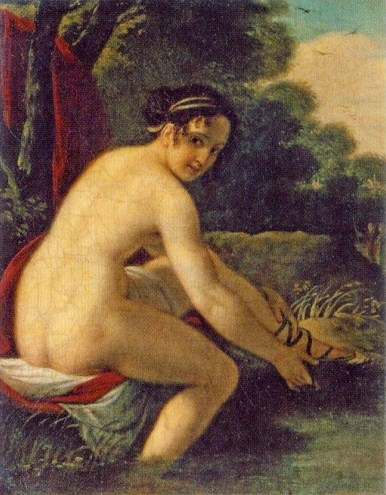
Susannah, 1813

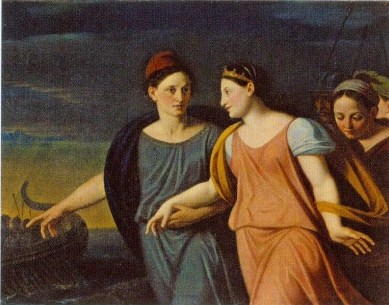
Abduction of Helen by Paris, 1831

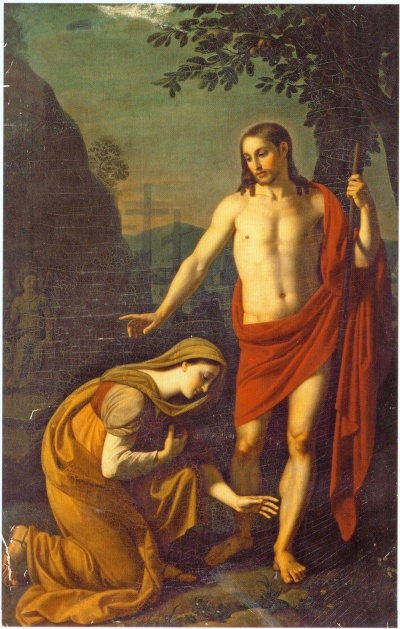
Noli me tangere, 1818

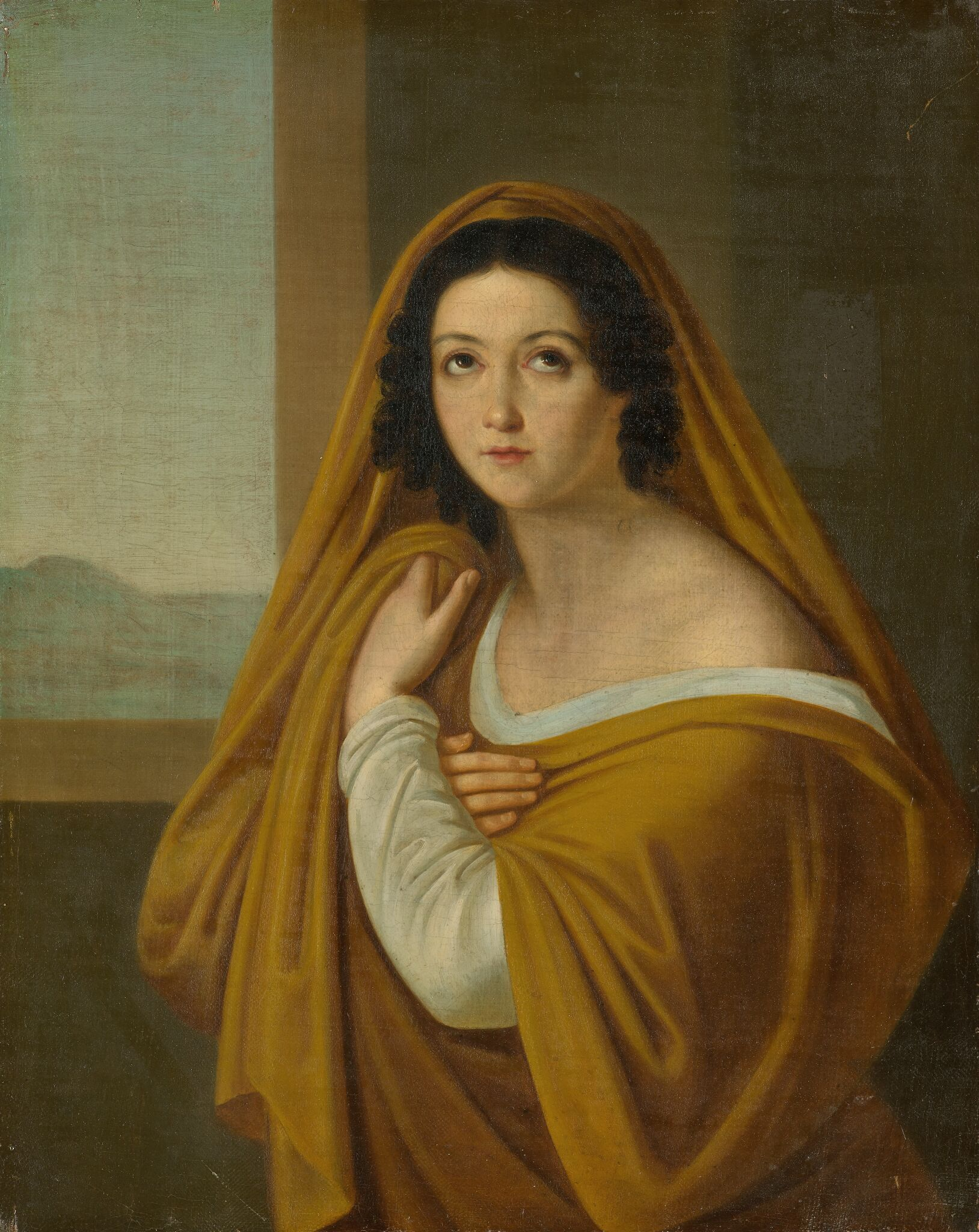
Avdotya Golitsyna as a Vestal Priestess
