= Alexandre-Gabriel Decamps =

French painter (1803–1860)

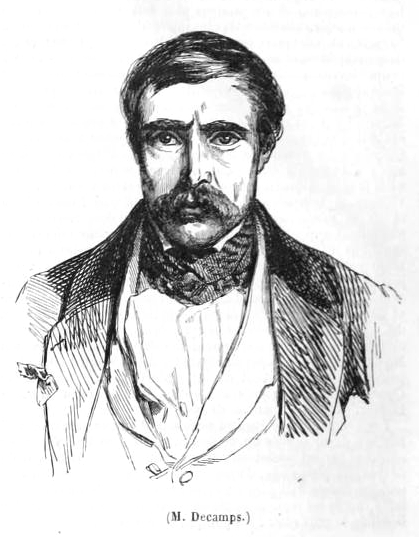
- Born: March 3, 1803; Paris, France
- Died: August 22, 1860 (aged 57); Fontainebleau, France
- Known for: Painting, drawing
- Movement: Orientalist

Alexandre-Gabriel Decamps (March 3, 1803 – August 22, 1860) was a French painter noted for his Orientalist works.

== Life ==
Decamps was born in Paris. In his youth he travelled in the East, and reproduced Oriental life and scenery with a bold fidelity to nature that puzzled conventional critics. His powers, however, soon came to be recognized, and he was ranked along with Delacroix and Ingres as one of the leaders of the French school. At the Paris Exhibition of 1855 he received the grand or council medal. Most of his life was passed in the neighborhood of Paris. He was fond of animals, especially dogs, and indulged in all kinds of field sports.

He died in 1860 in consequence of being thrown from a horse while hunting at Fontainebleau.

== Founding father of Orientalism ==
Decamps was the founding father of Orientalism since he revealed everyday Oriental life in the 1831 Salon in Paris. His subjects and style with strong contrast of light and thick material became the reference for painters but also photographers and writers. He was the most influential painter on Orientalism and was proclaimed the chief of the new Orientalist School. Delacroix referred to him in the Women of Algiers (1834), and the Fanatics of Tangiers (1838). Théophile Gautier's Constantinople (1853) was described as an “immense verbal Decamps” by Henry James. Maxime Du Camp named him the Christopher Columbus of the Orient and Théophile Gautier compared his role as the discoverer of the Orient to the role of Jean-Jacques Rousseau as the discoverer of nature in the eighteenth century. Christine Peltre concludes that the only equivalent to his fame were the Arabian Nights (One Thousand and One Nights).

== Works ==
Decamps' style was characteristically and intensely French. It was marked by vivid dramatic conception, bold and even rough brushstrokes, and startling contrasts of color and of light and shade. His subjects embraced an unusually wide range. He availed himself of his travels in the East in dealing with scenes from Scripture history, which he was probably the first of European painters to represent with their true and natural local background. Of this class were his Joseph sold by his Brethren, Moses taken from the Nile, and his scenes from the life of Samson, nine vigorous sketches in charcoal and white.

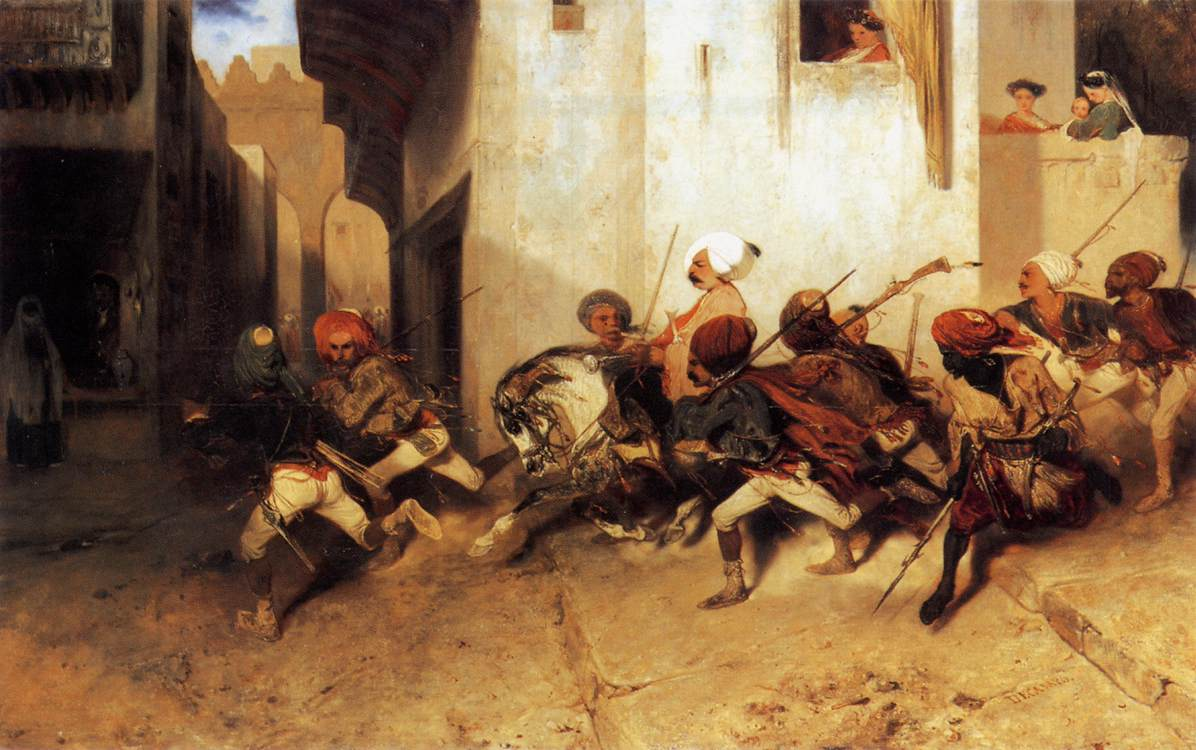
A version of The Turkish Patrol (1831)

Perhaps the most impressive of his historical pictures is Defeat of the Cimbri, representing the conflict between a horde of barbarians and a disciplined army. Decamps produced a number of genre pictures, chiefly scenes from French and Turkish domestic life, the most marked feature of which is humour. The same characteristic attaches to many of his numerous animal paintings; Decamps was especially fond of painting monkeys. His well-known painting The Monkey Connoisseurs satirizes the jury of the French Academy of Painting, which had rejected several of his earlier works on account of their divergence from any known standard.

His paintings and drawings were first made familiar to the English public through the lithographs of Eugene le Rouit.

== Gallery ==
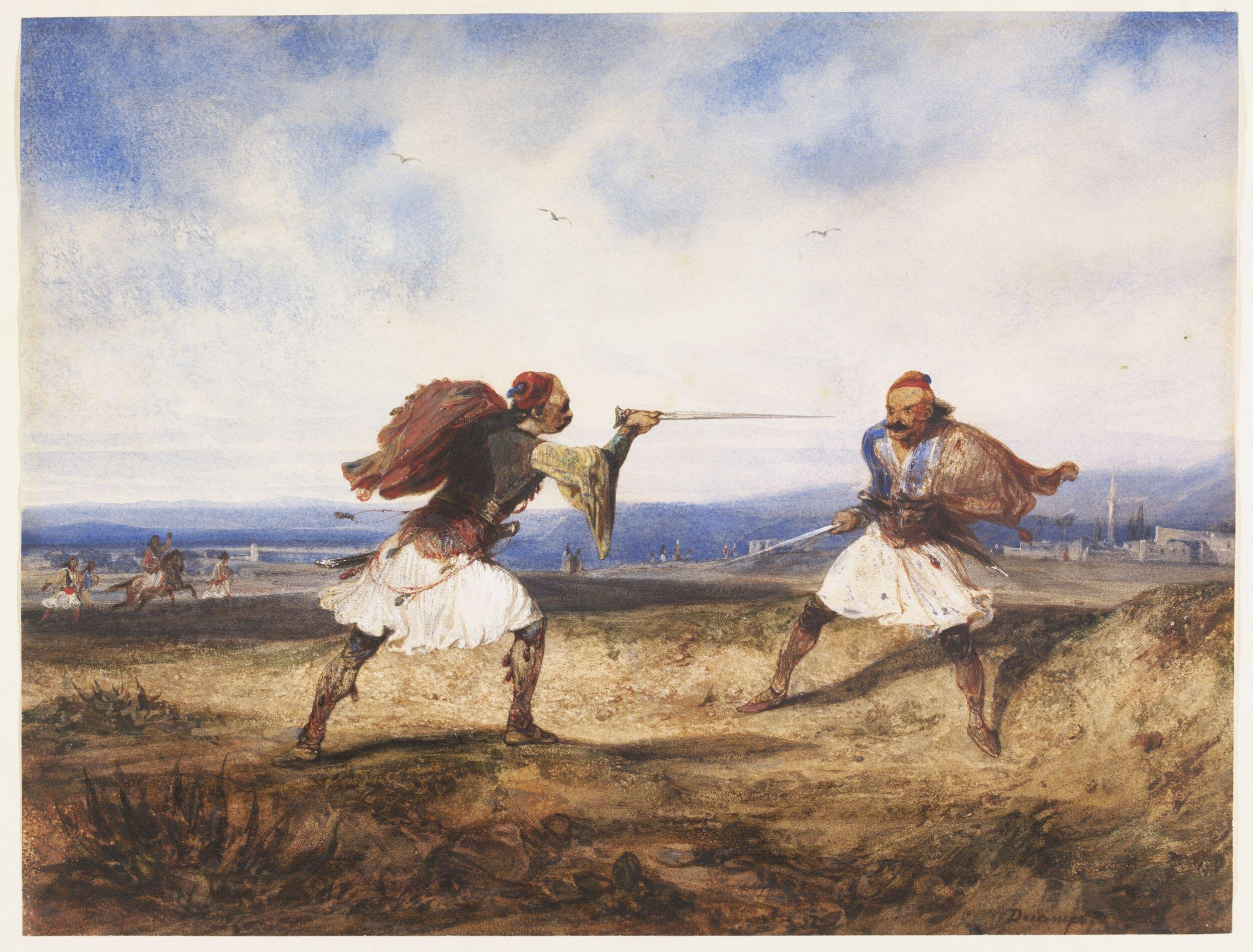
Albanian Duel (circa 1828)

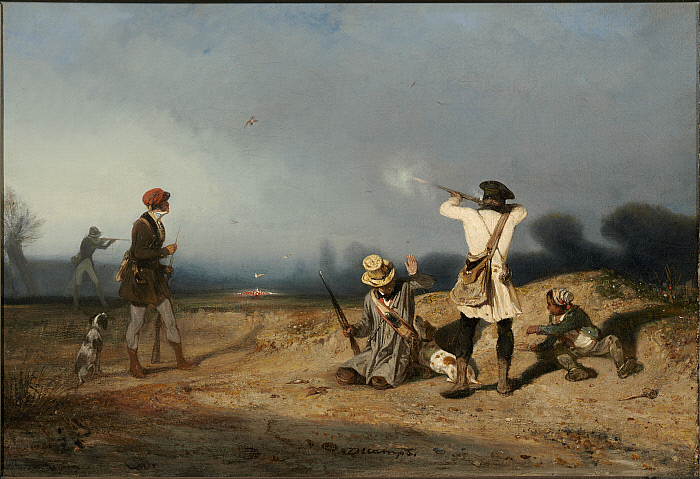
Bird Hunting (1830), oil on canvas, 13 11/16 x 20 in. (34.8 x 50.8 cm), Clark Art Institute

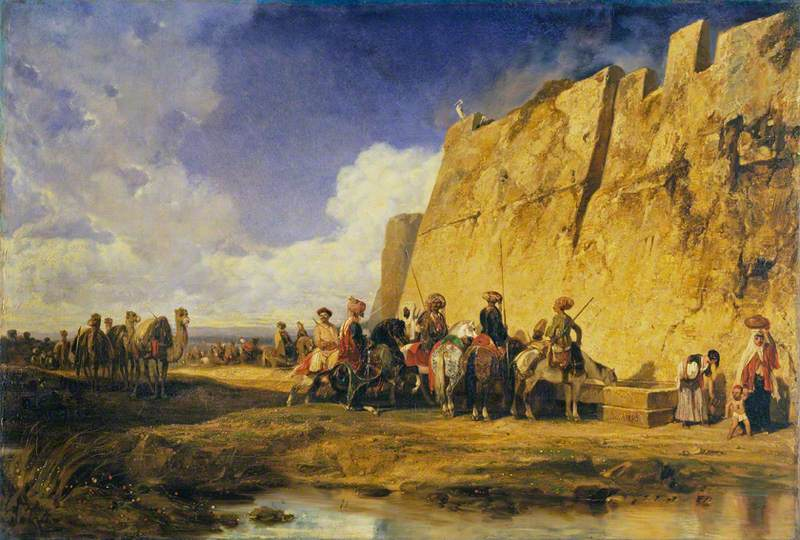
The Watering Place (1832)

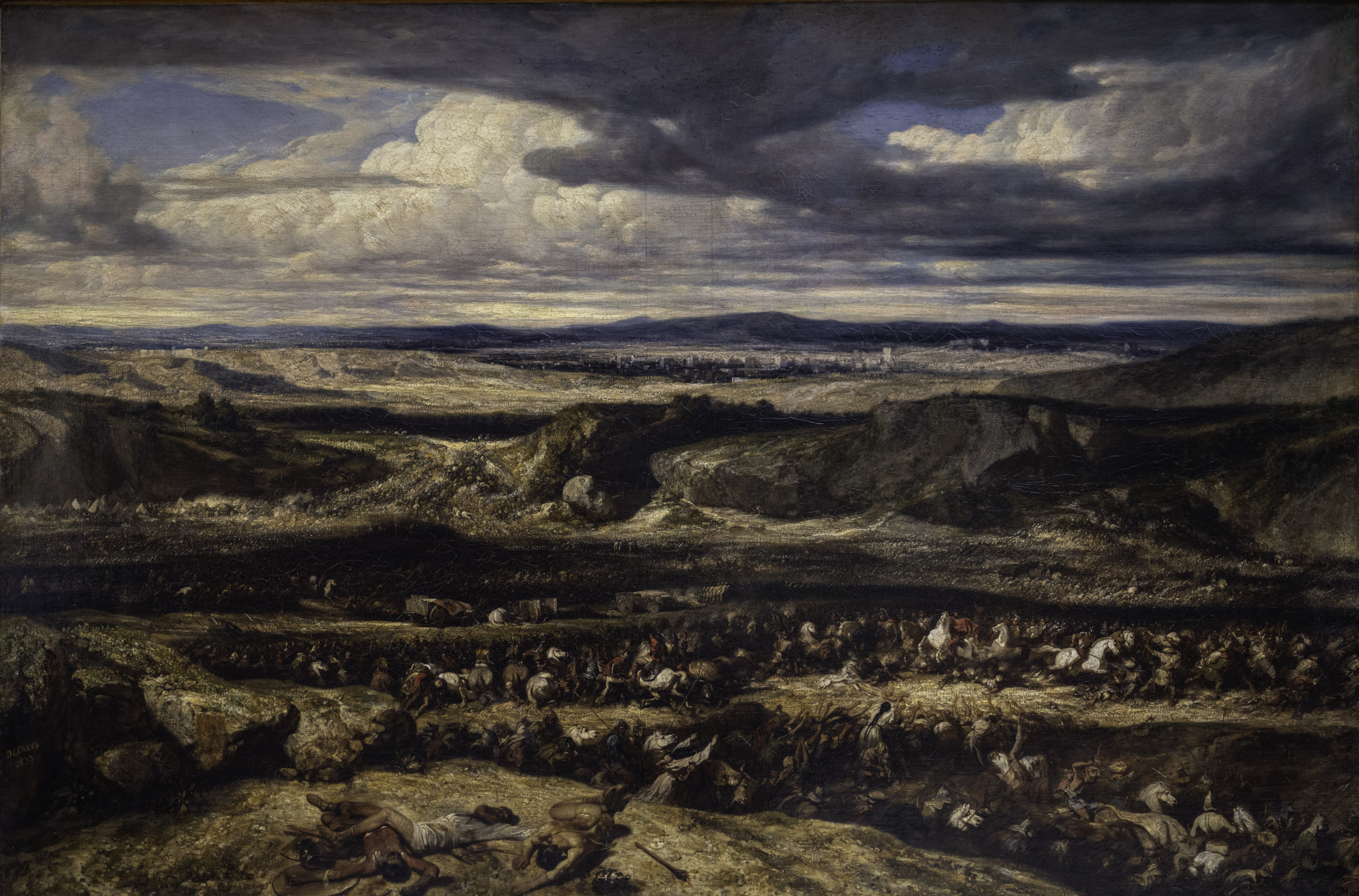
The Defeat of the Cimbri (1833)

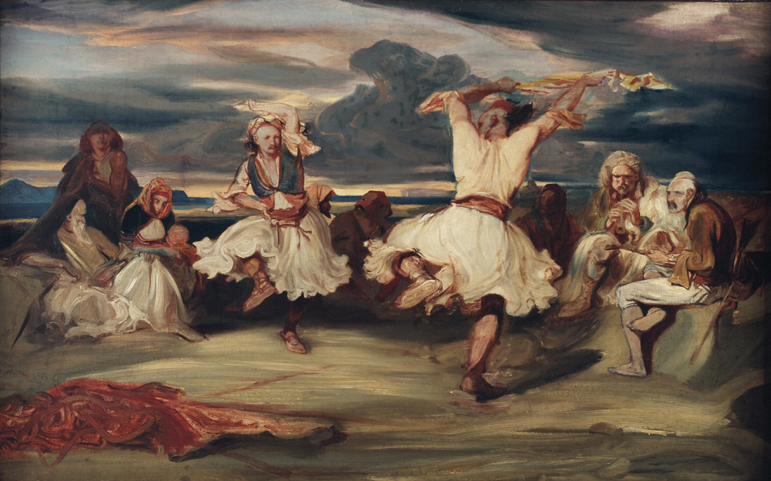
The Albanian dancer (1835)

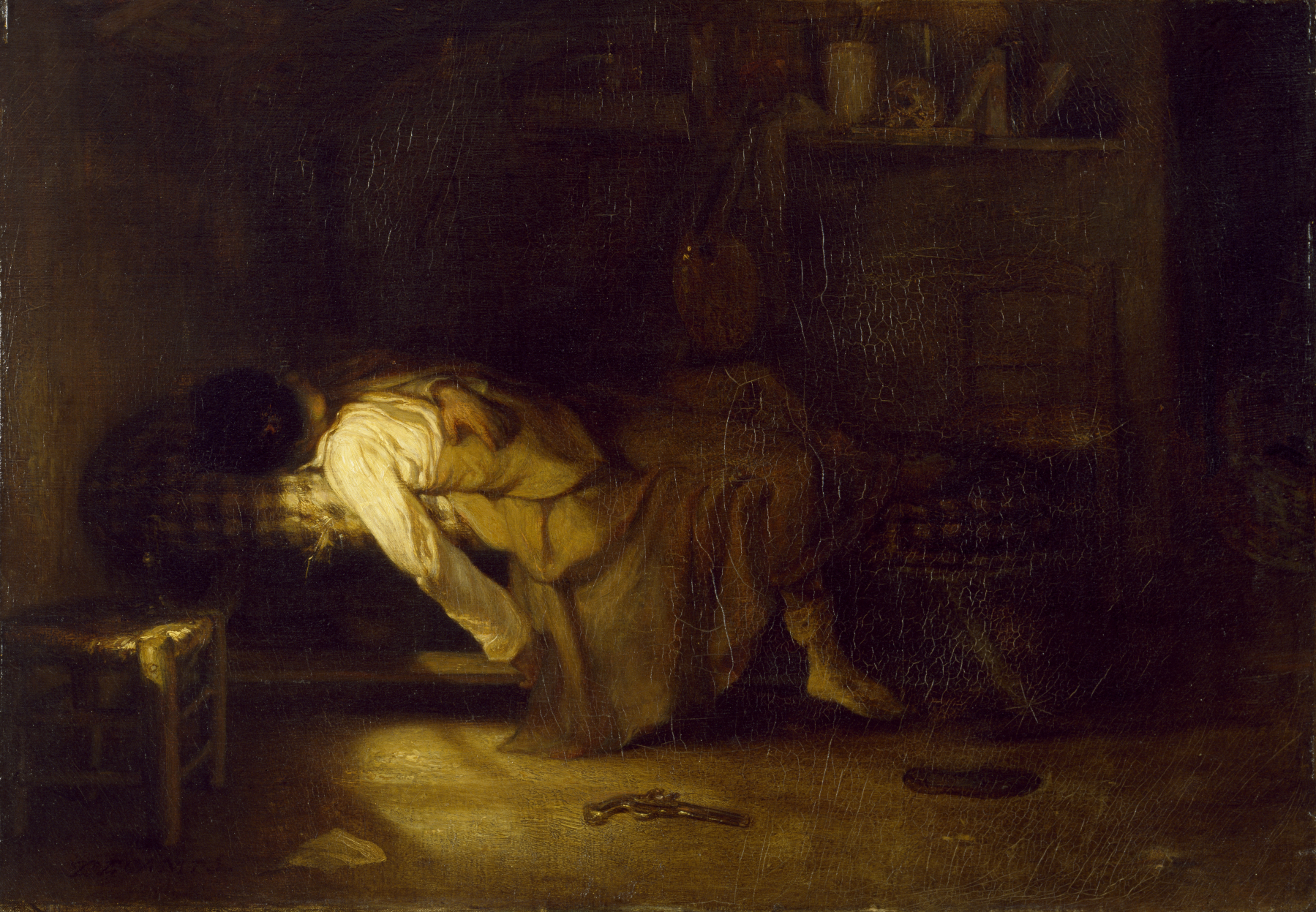
The Suicide (circa 1836). The Walters Art Museum.

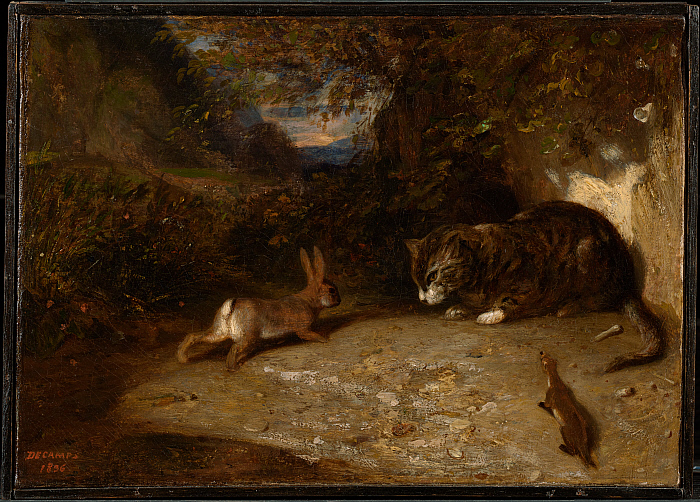
Cat, Weasel, and Rabbit (1836), oil on canvas, 9 1/2 x 13 1/2 in. (24.1 x 34.3 cm), Clark Art Institute

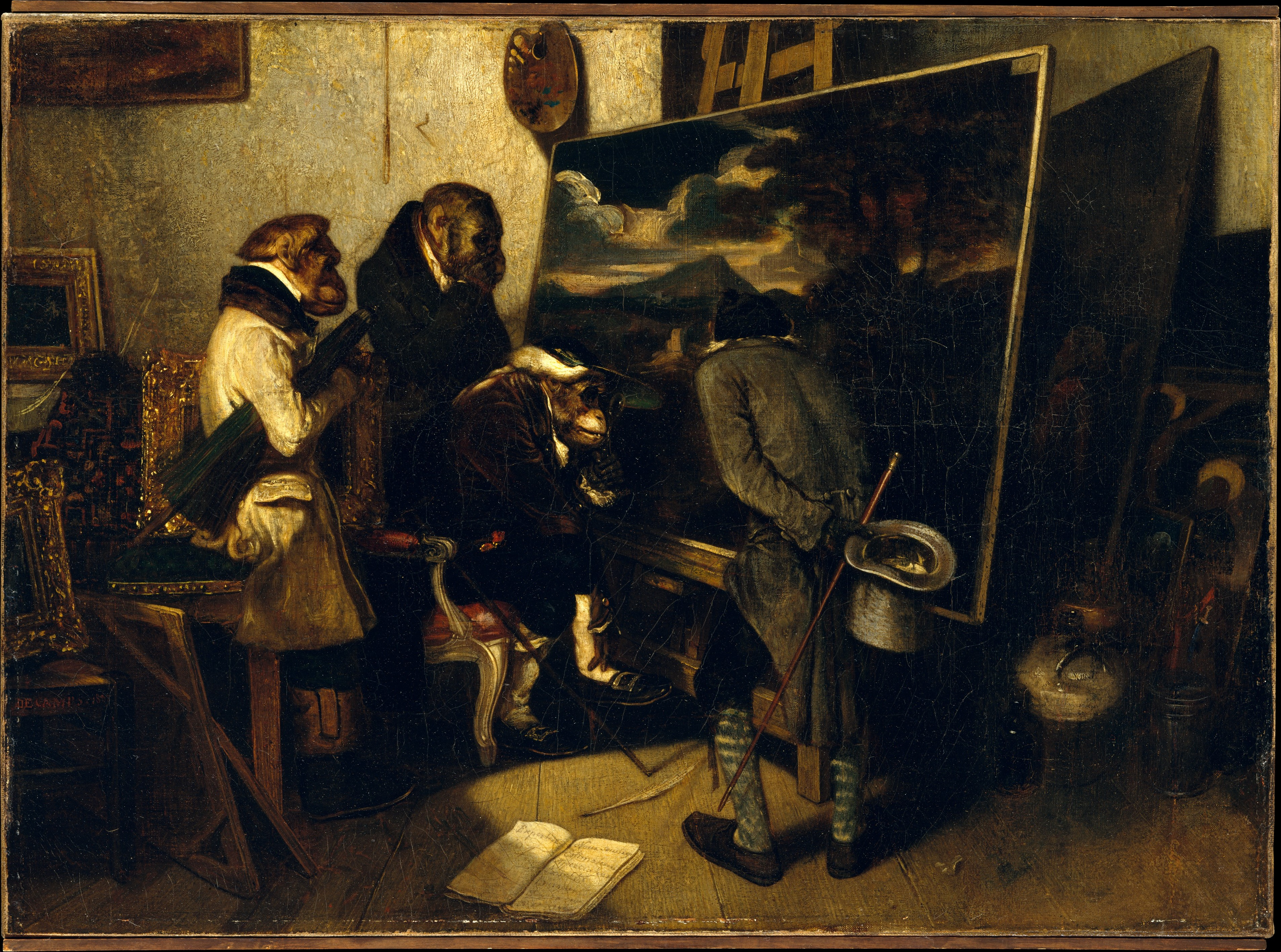
The Experts, 1837, oil on canvas, Metropolitan Museum of Art

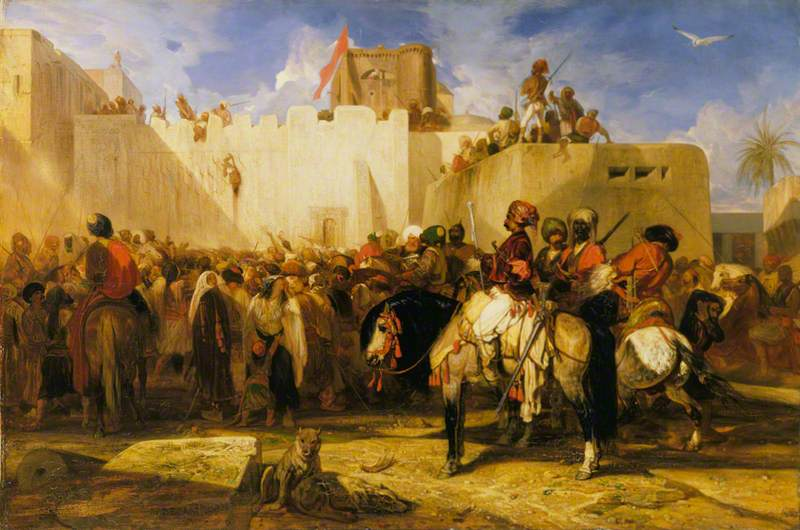
The Punishment of the Hooks (1837)

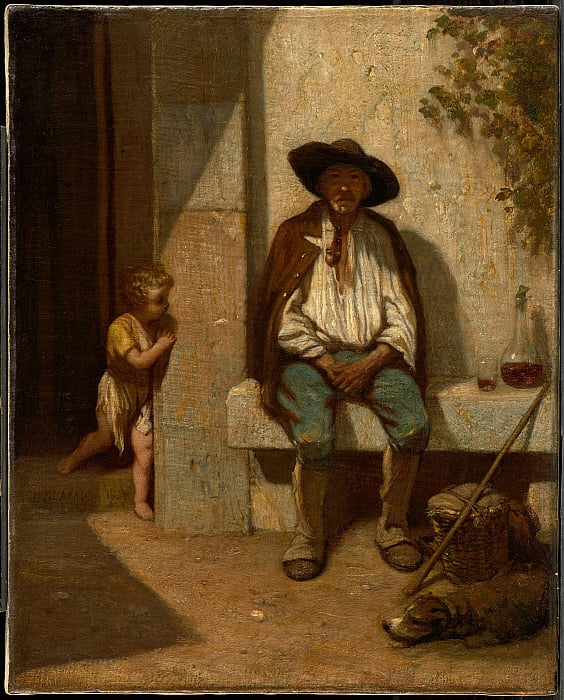
Italian Peasant (1842), oil on canvas, 15 5/8 x 12 1/2 in. (39.7 x 31.8 cm), Clark Art Institute

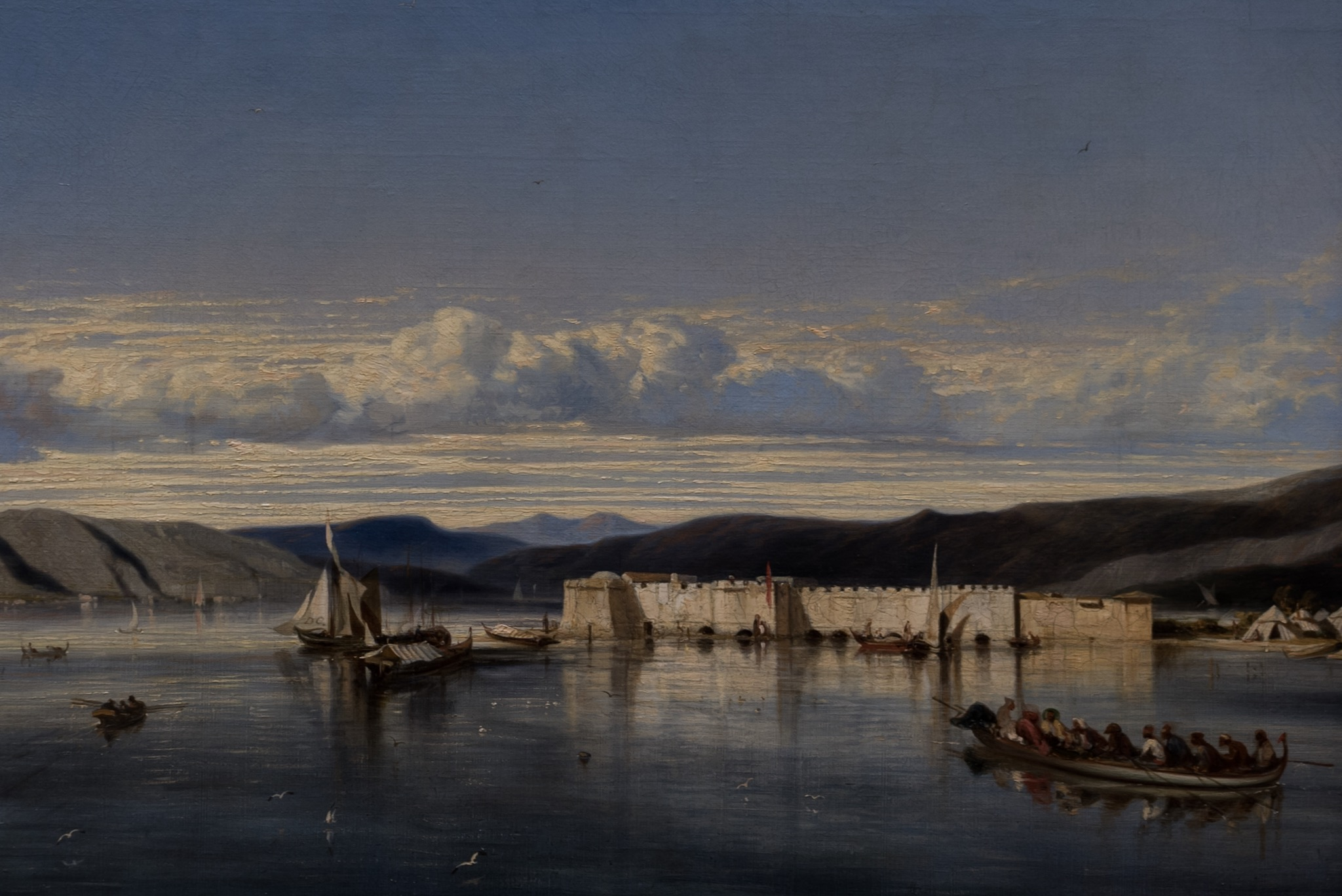
The Anchorage of Smyrna (1847)

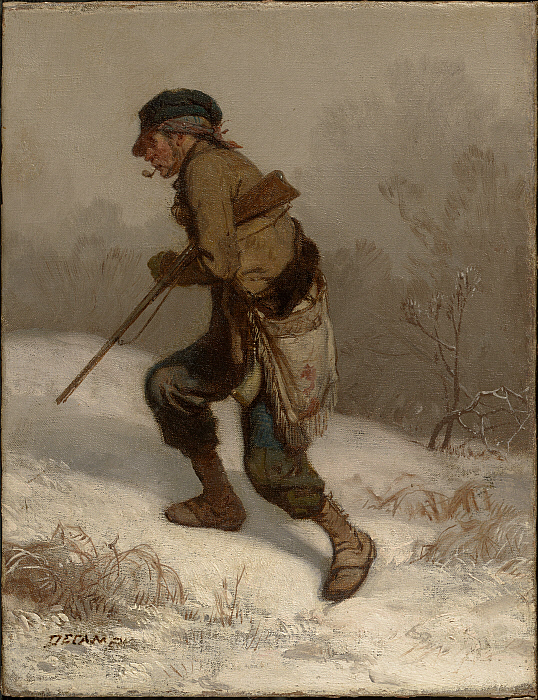
The Poacher (1847), oil on canvas, 9 1/2 x 7 5/16 in. (24.1 x 18.6 cm), Clark Art Institute

== See also ==
- List of Orientalist artists
- Orientalism
