= Jan Mooy =

Dutch painter

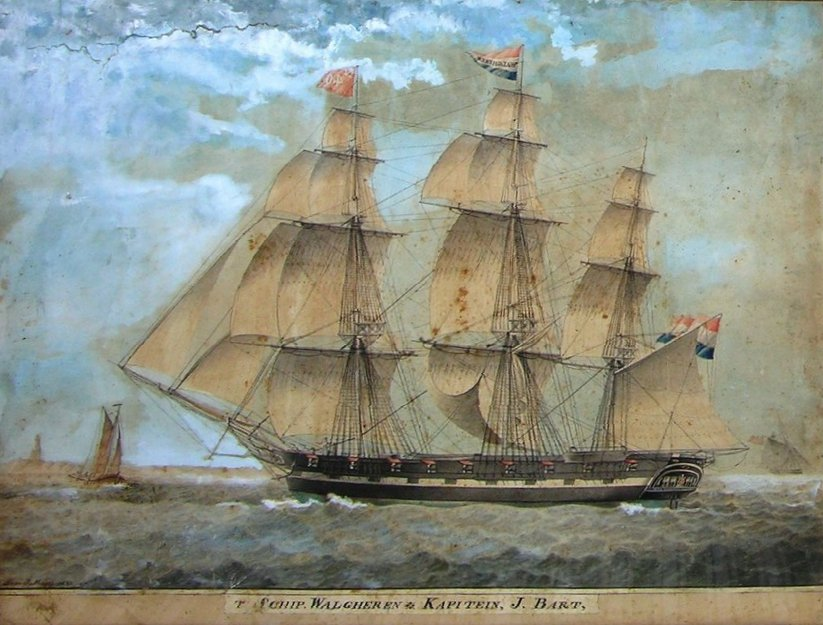
T Schip. Walgheren Kapitein, J. Bart by Jan Mooy in 1837

Jan Mooy (8 September 1776 in Callantsoog – 15 September 1847 in Den Helder), was a Dutch painter.

Mooy painted primarily marine art and watercolors. One of his works can be found at the Peabody Essex Museum.
