= Royal Academy Exhibition of 1836 =

1836 art exhibition in London

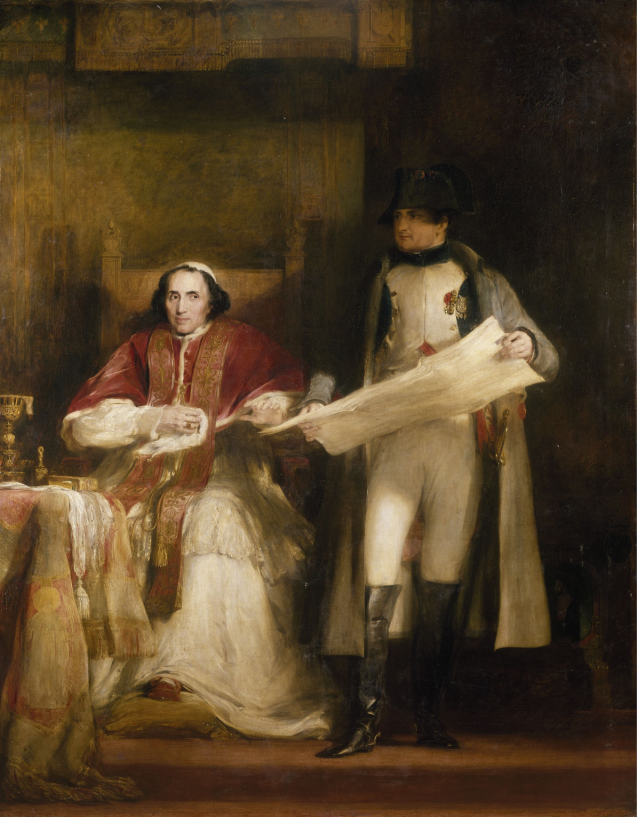
Napoleon and Pius VII at Fontainebleau by David Wilkie

The Royal Academy Exhibition of 1836 was the annual Summer Exhibition of the British Royal Academy of Arts running from 2 May to 16 July 1836. It featured more than a thousand submissions from leading artists and architects.

It was the notable as the last exhibition to be held at Somerset House in London, home to the Royal Academy since 1780, before it moved to new premises at the recently constructed National Gallery on Trafalgar Square. In recognition of this John Constable submitted a landscape painting Cenotaph to the Memory of Sir Joshua Reynolds paying tribute to the first President of the Royal Academy Joshua Reynolds and the art collector Sir George Beaumont, both of whom were associated with the Somerset House era. It was also to be Constable's final appearance at the academy as he died before the opening of the following year's Exhibition of 1837.

Constable's rival J. M. W. Turner exhibited three oil paintings but came under a fierce attack from critic of the Edinburgh-based Blackwood's Magazine, particularly his Juliet and her Nurse. The attack led Turner's admirer John Ruskin to launch a defence leading to his influential five-volume Modern Painters.

In portraiture the current President of the academy Martin Archer Shee displayed two paintings commissioned to hang in the Waterloo Chamber of Windsor Castle, commemorating the victory in the Napoleonic Wars two decades earlier. Although The Times was critical of the general quality of portraits displayed that year Margaret Sarah Carpenter's Portrait of Ada Lovelace was particularly praised.

The Scottish artist David Wilkie submitted the history paintings Napoleon and Pius VII at Fontainebleau, and The Duke of Wellington Writing Dispatches both featuring scenes from the Napoleonic Wars. He also displayed the genre work The Peep-o'-Day Boys' Cabin inspired by a recent visit to Ireland. George Jones submitted Godiva's Return, a sequel to his 1833 painting Godiva Preparing to Ride through Coventry.

== Gallery ==
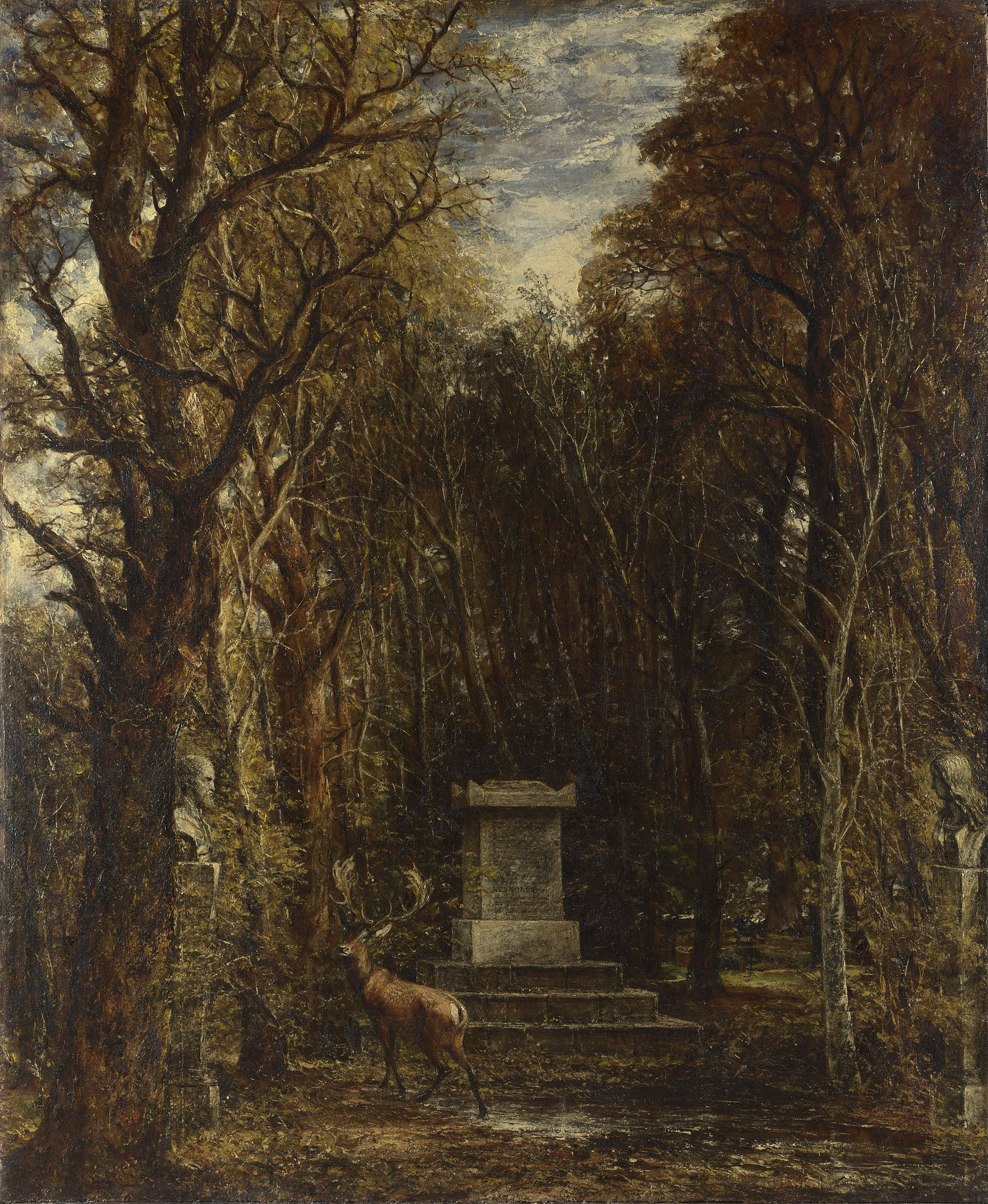
Cenotaph to the Memory of Sir Joshua Reynolds by John Constable

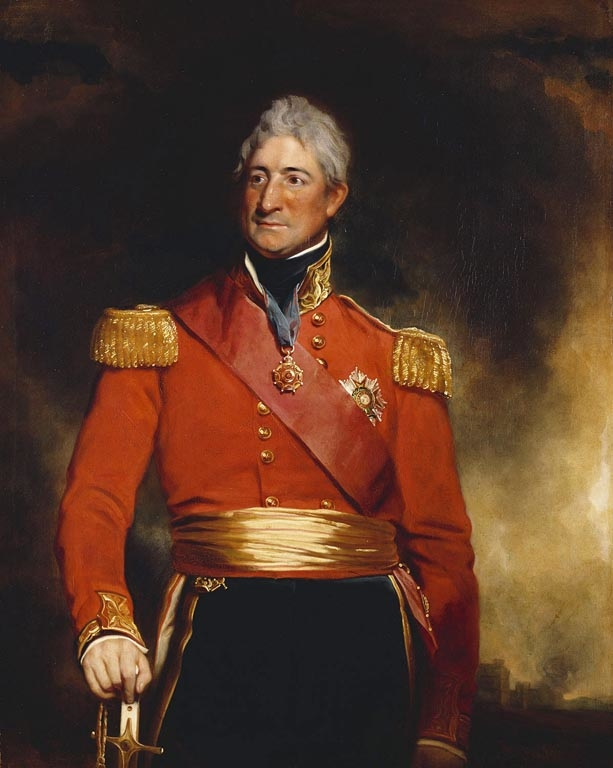
Portrait of Thomas Picton by Martin Archer Shee

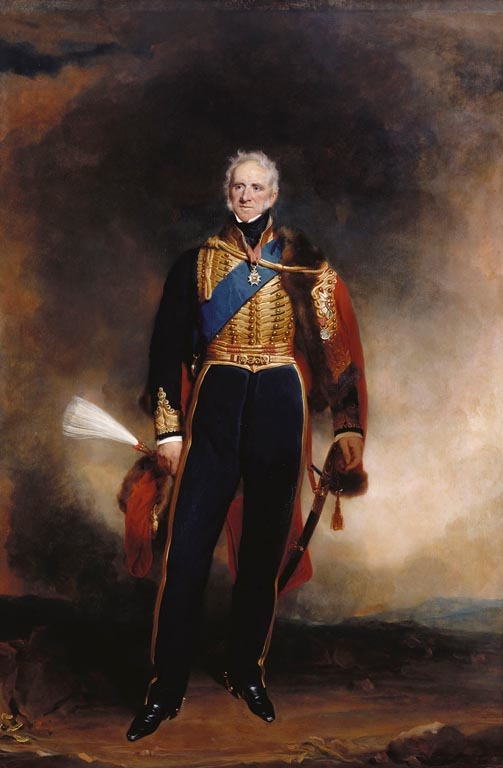
Portrait of the Marquess of Anglesey by Martin Archer Shee

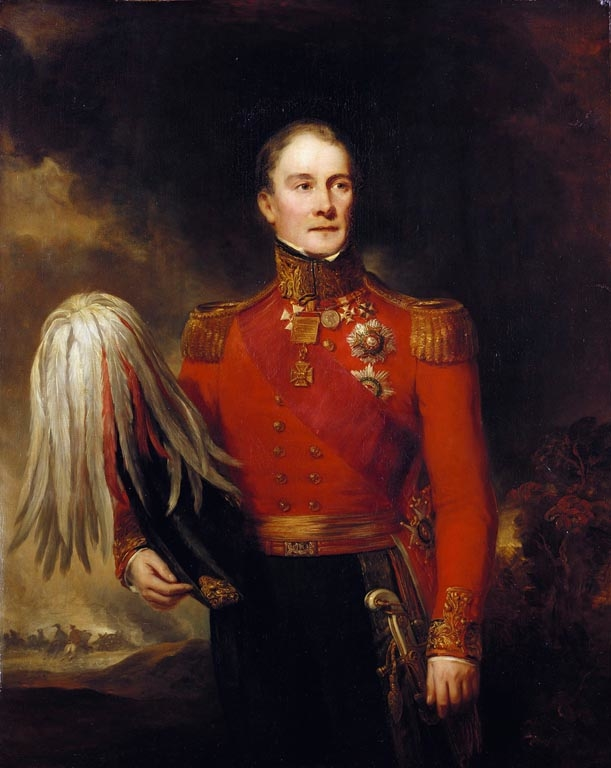
Portrait of James Kempt by Robert McInnes

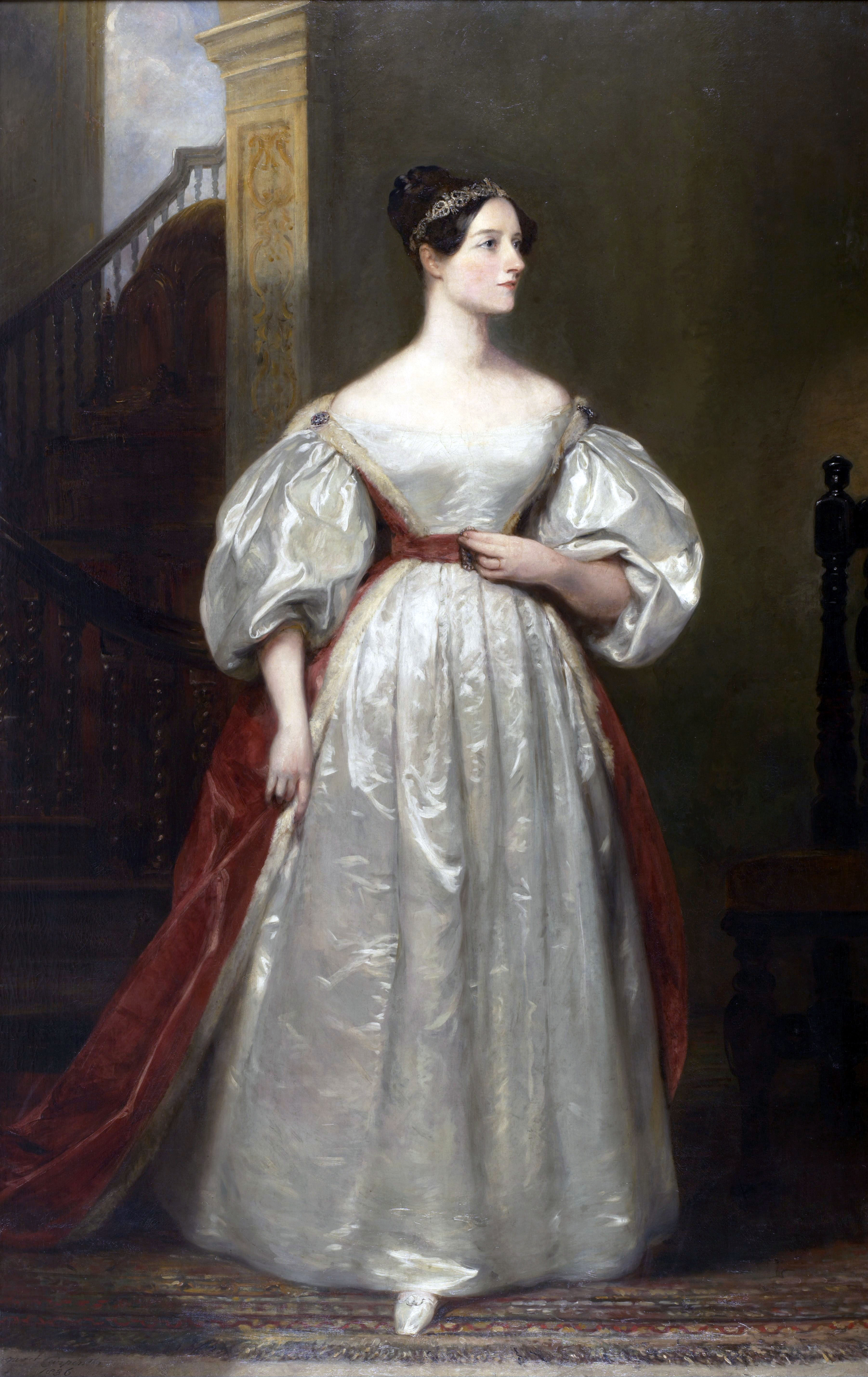
Portrait of Ada Lovelace by Margaret Sarah Carpenter

The Duke of Wellington Writing Dispatches by David Wilkie

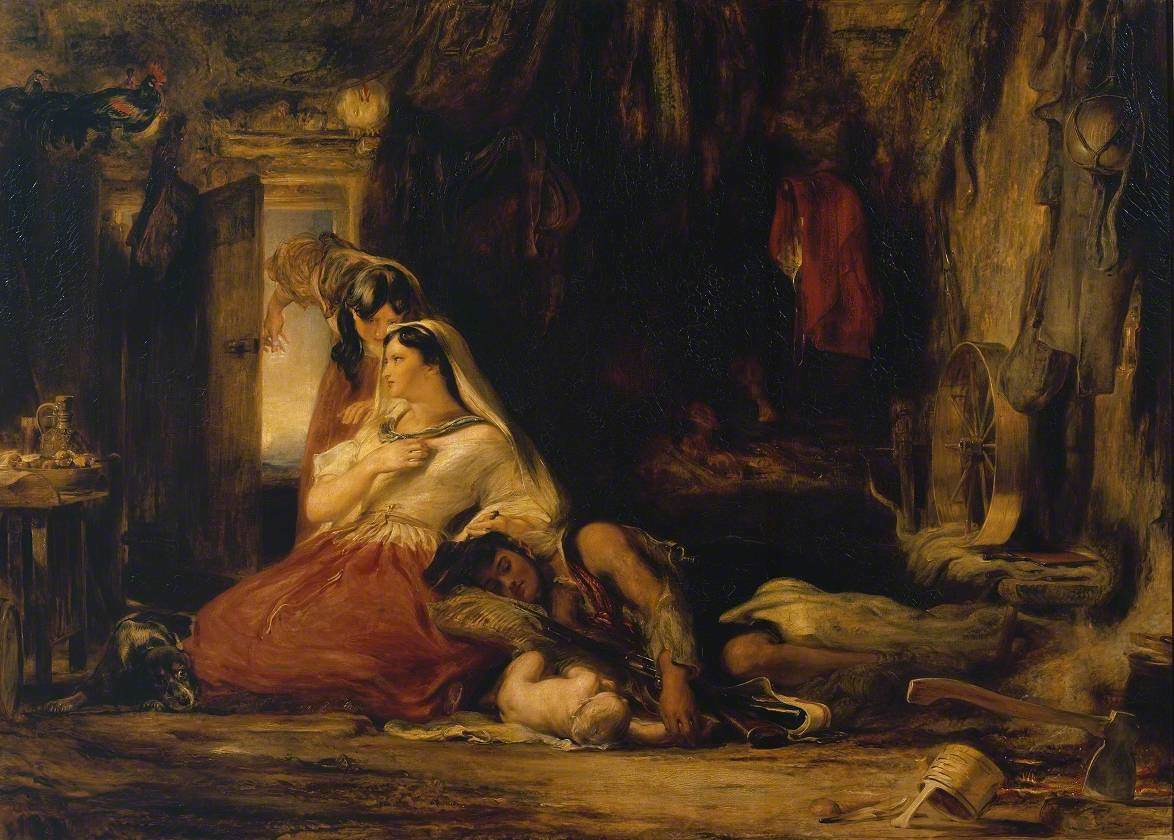
The Peep-o'-Day Boys' Cabin by David Wilkie

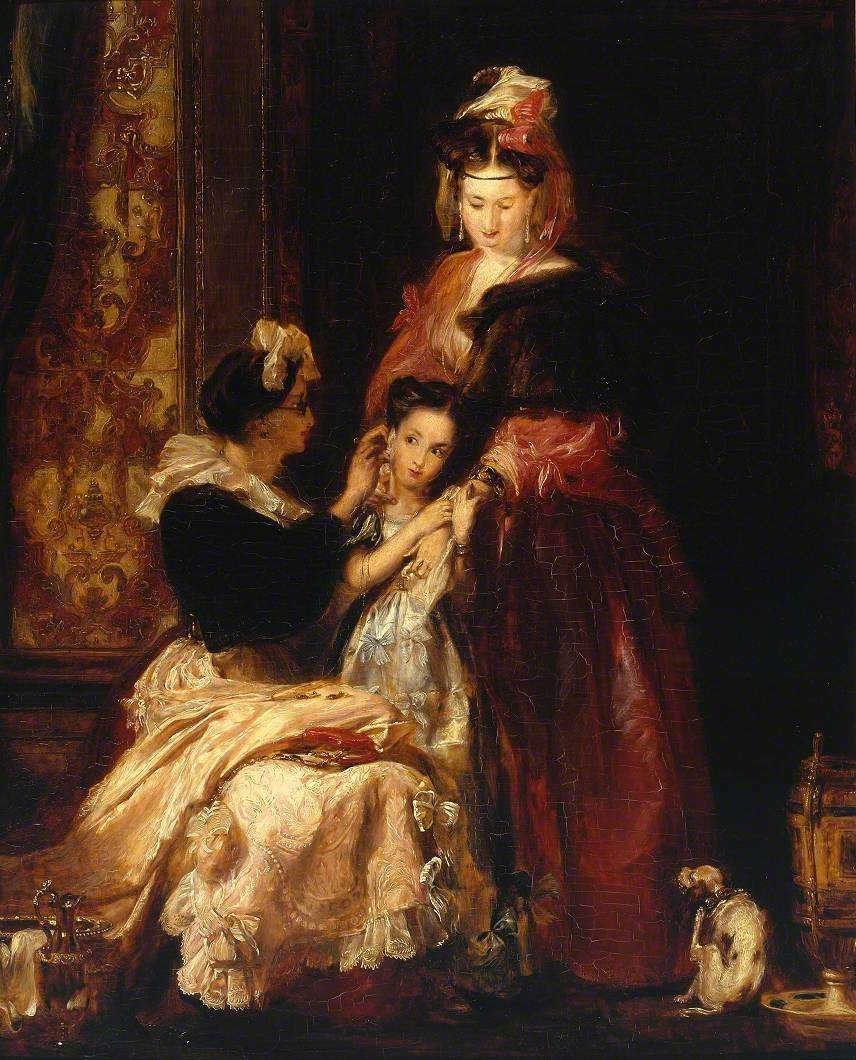
The First Earring by David Wilkie

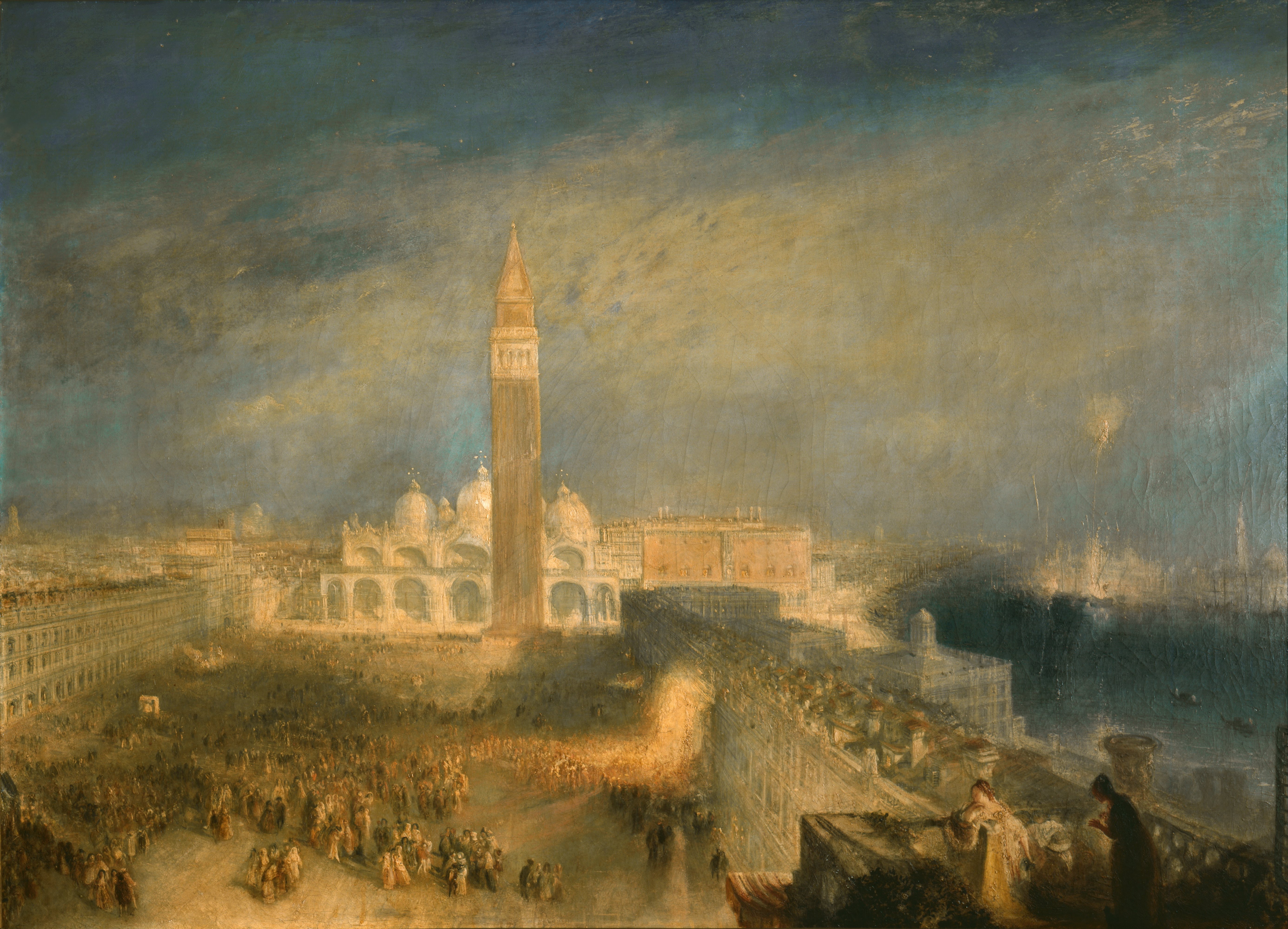
Juliet and Her Nurse by J. M. W. Turner

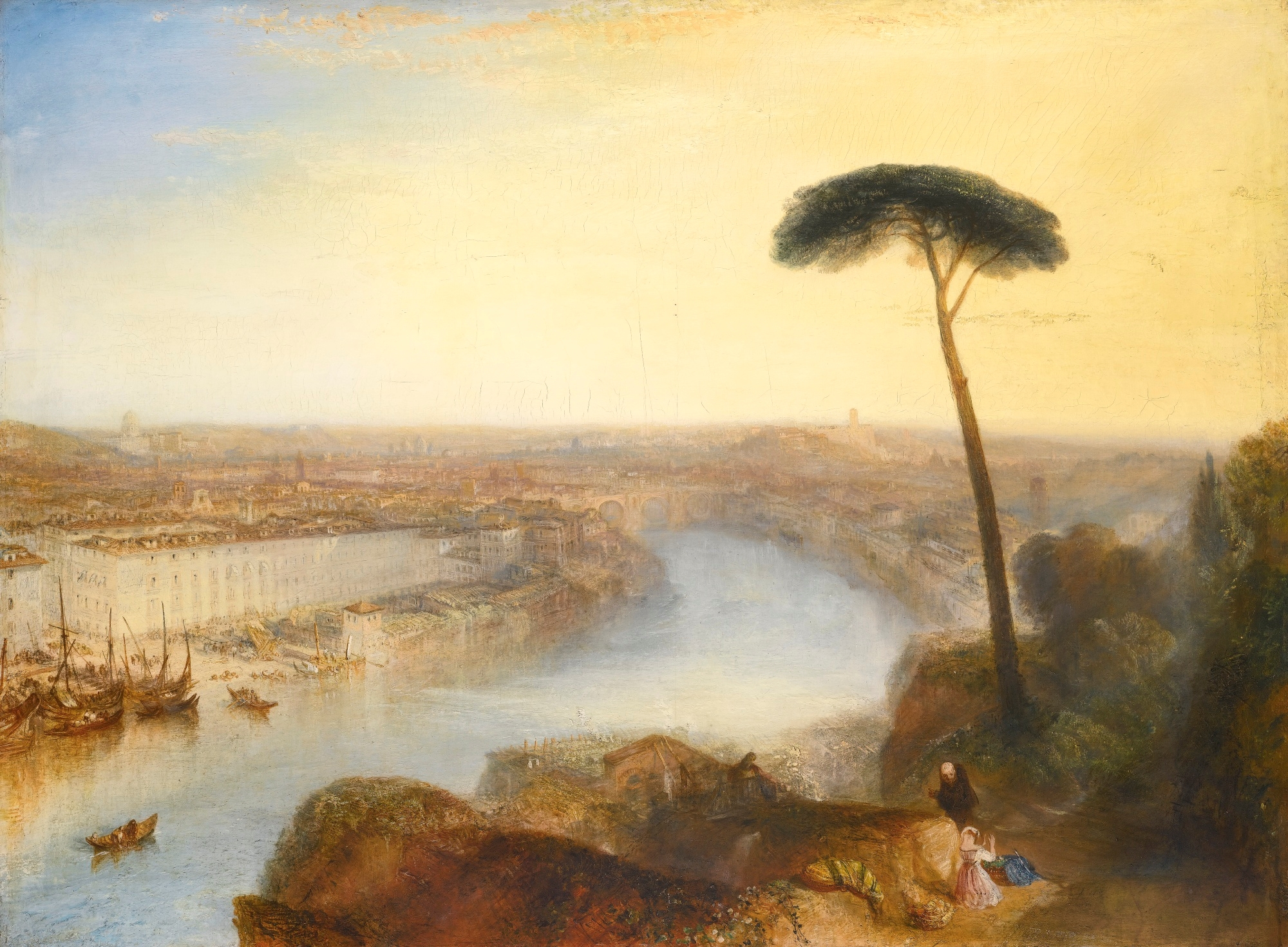
Rome, From Mount Aventine by J. M. W. Turner

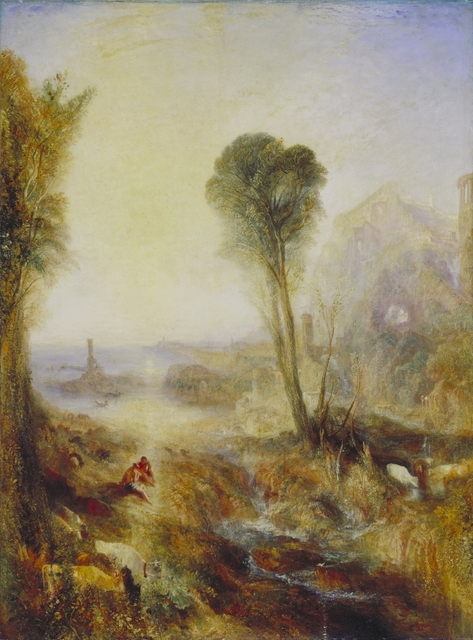
Mercury and Argus by J. M. W. Turner

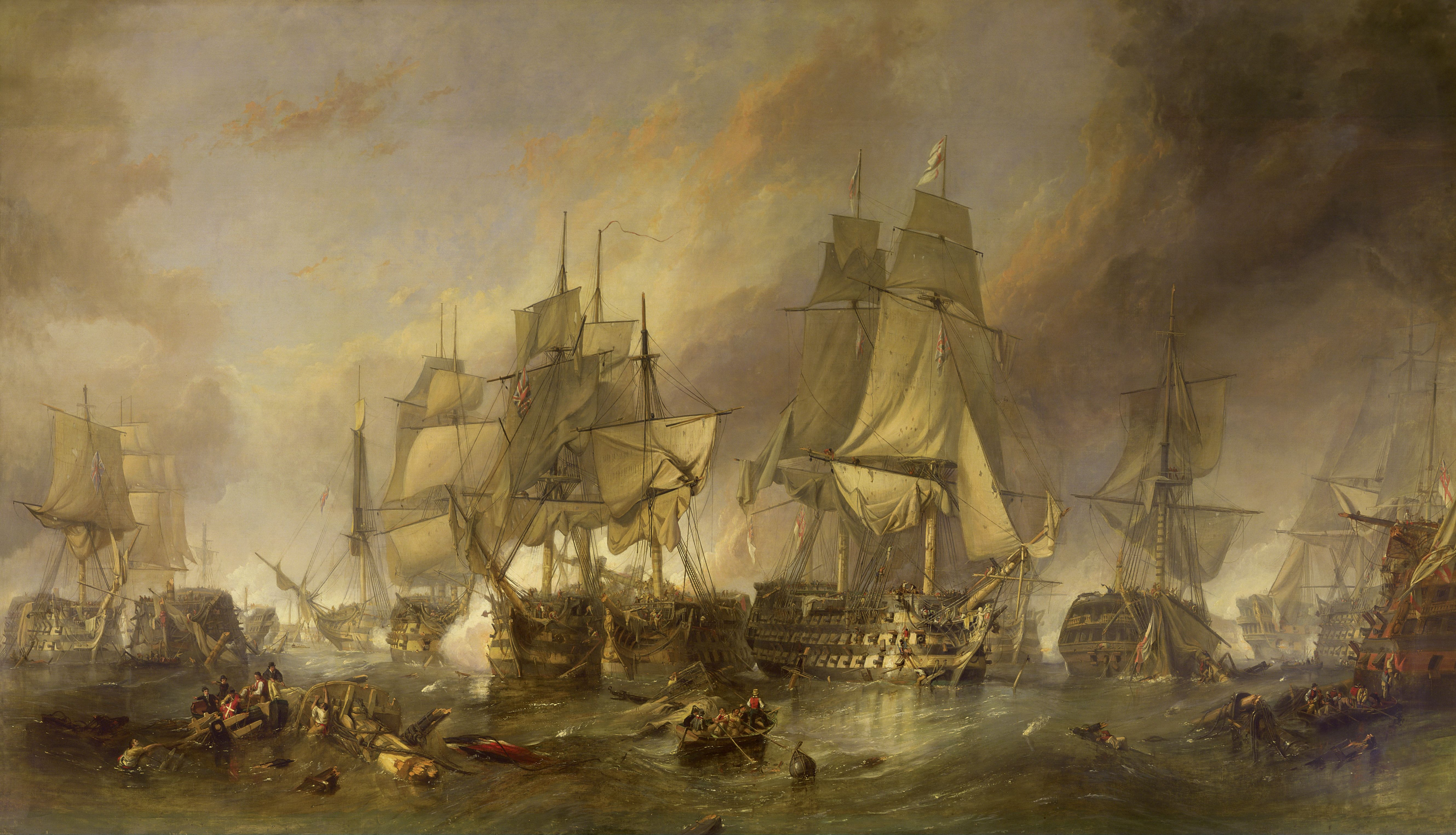
The Battle of Trafalgar by Clarkson Stanfield

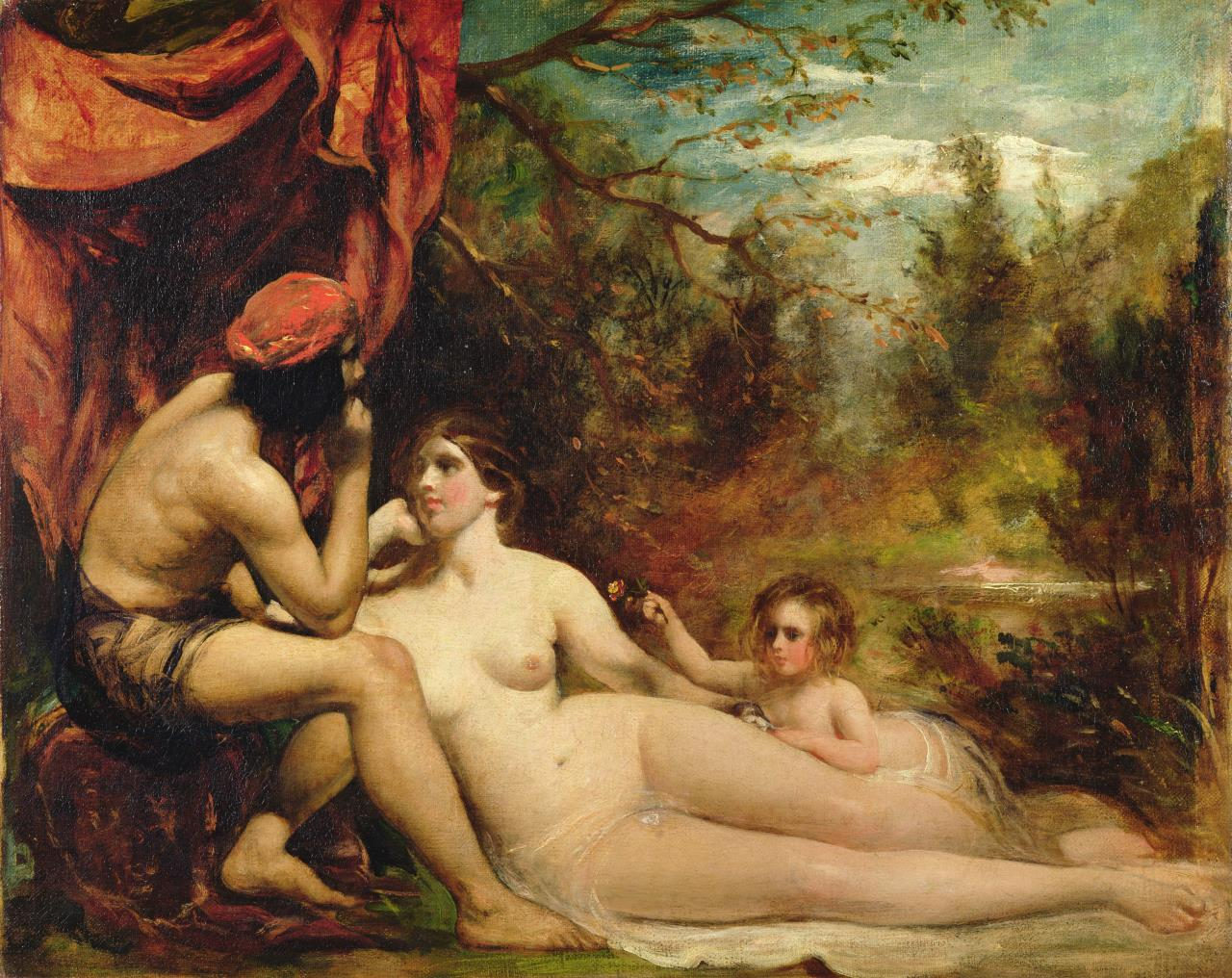
A Family of the Forest by William Etty

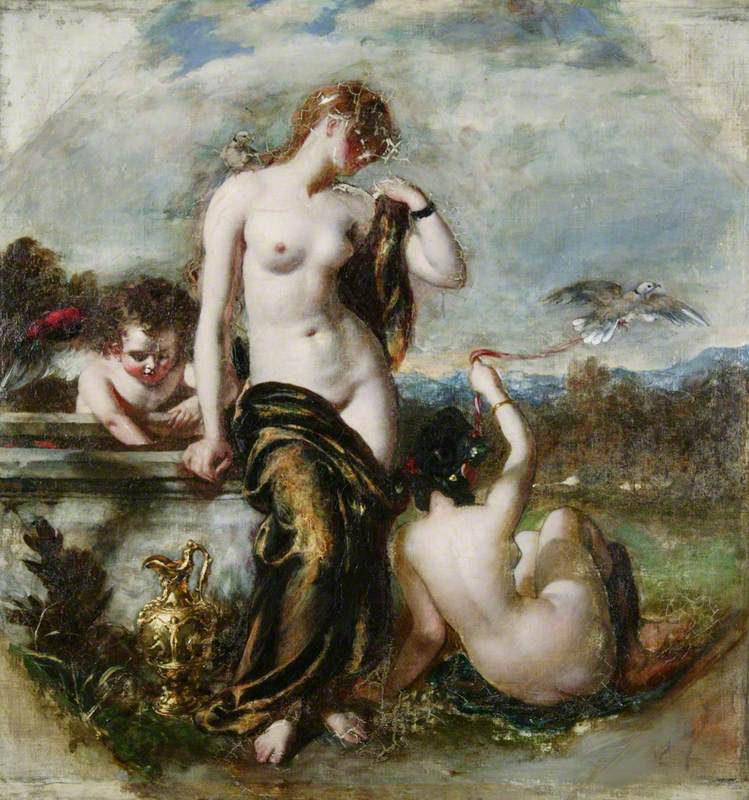
Venus and Her Doves by William Etty

Dick Whittington and his Cat by William Allan

Scene in Chillingham Park by Edwin Landseer

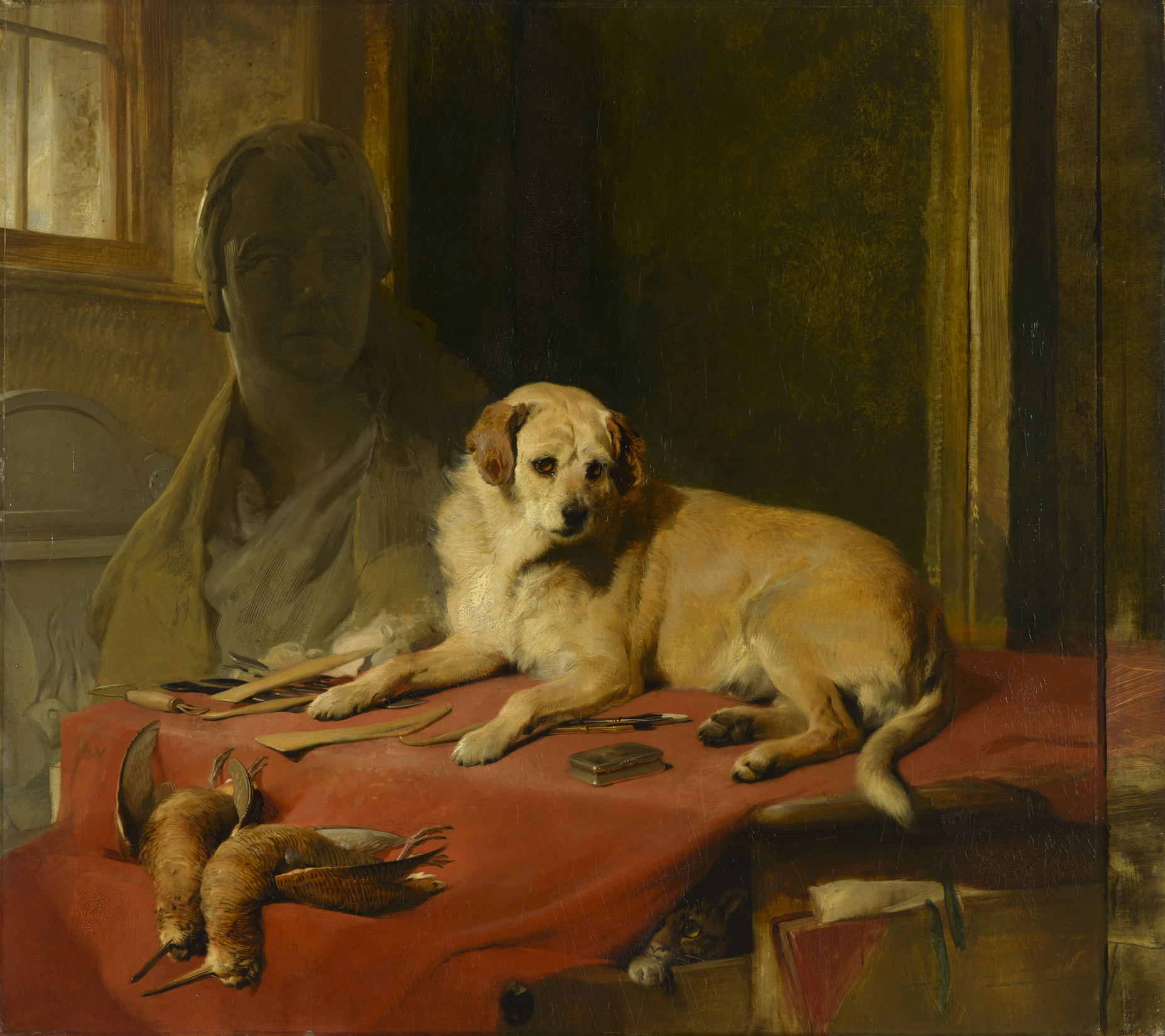
Pen, Brush and Chisel by Edwin Landseer

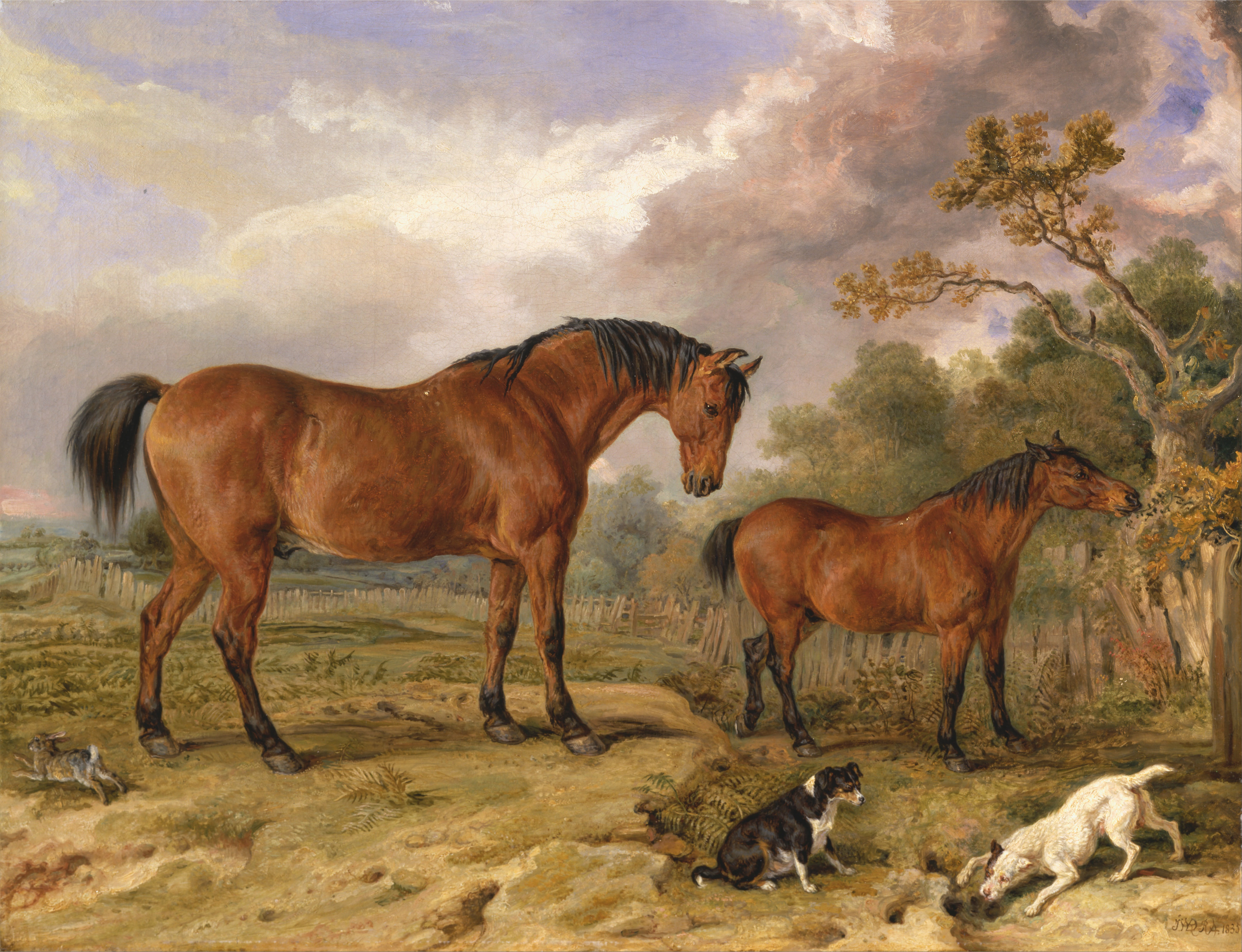
Reformer, Blucher, Tory and Crib by James Ward

Interior of the Cathedral of Bayonne by David Roberts

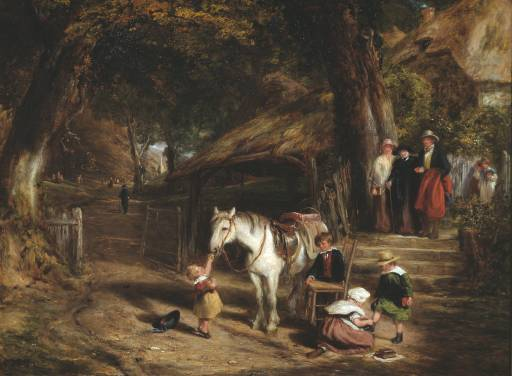
Sunday Morning by William Collins

Happy as a King by William Collins

The Trent in the Tyrol by Augustus Wall Callcott

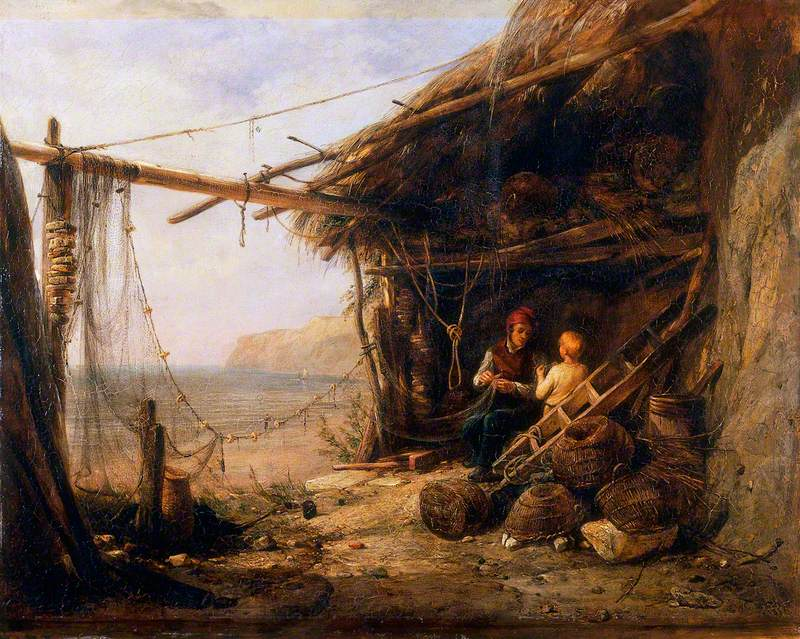
Mending the Bait-Nets, Shanklin by Edward William Cooke

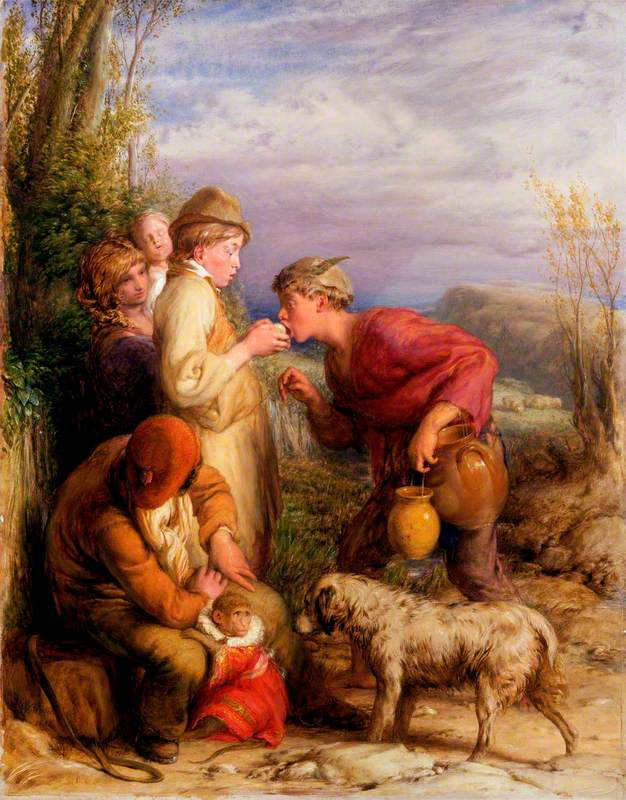
Giving a Bite by William Mulready

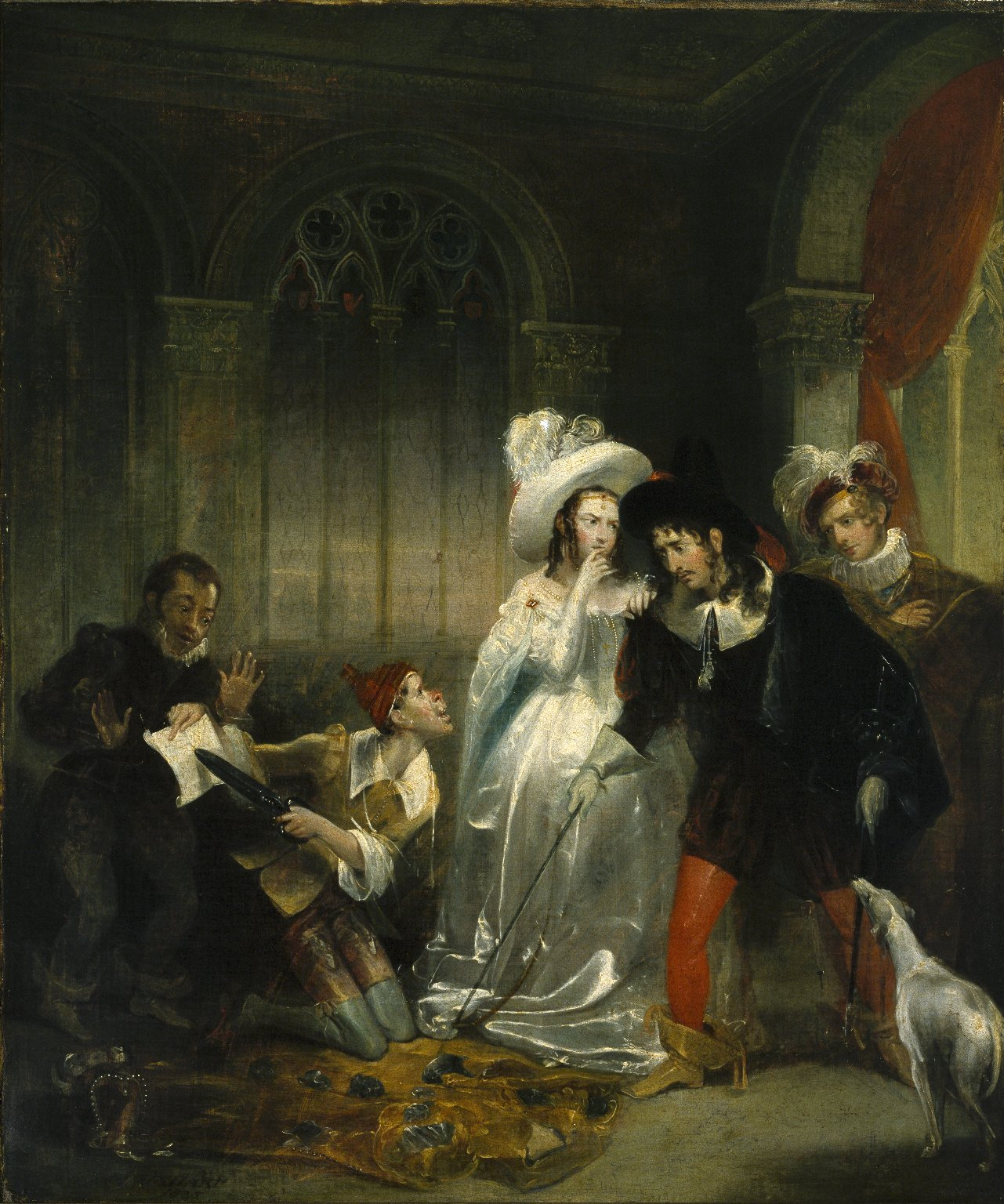
The Taming of the Shrew by Michael William Sharp

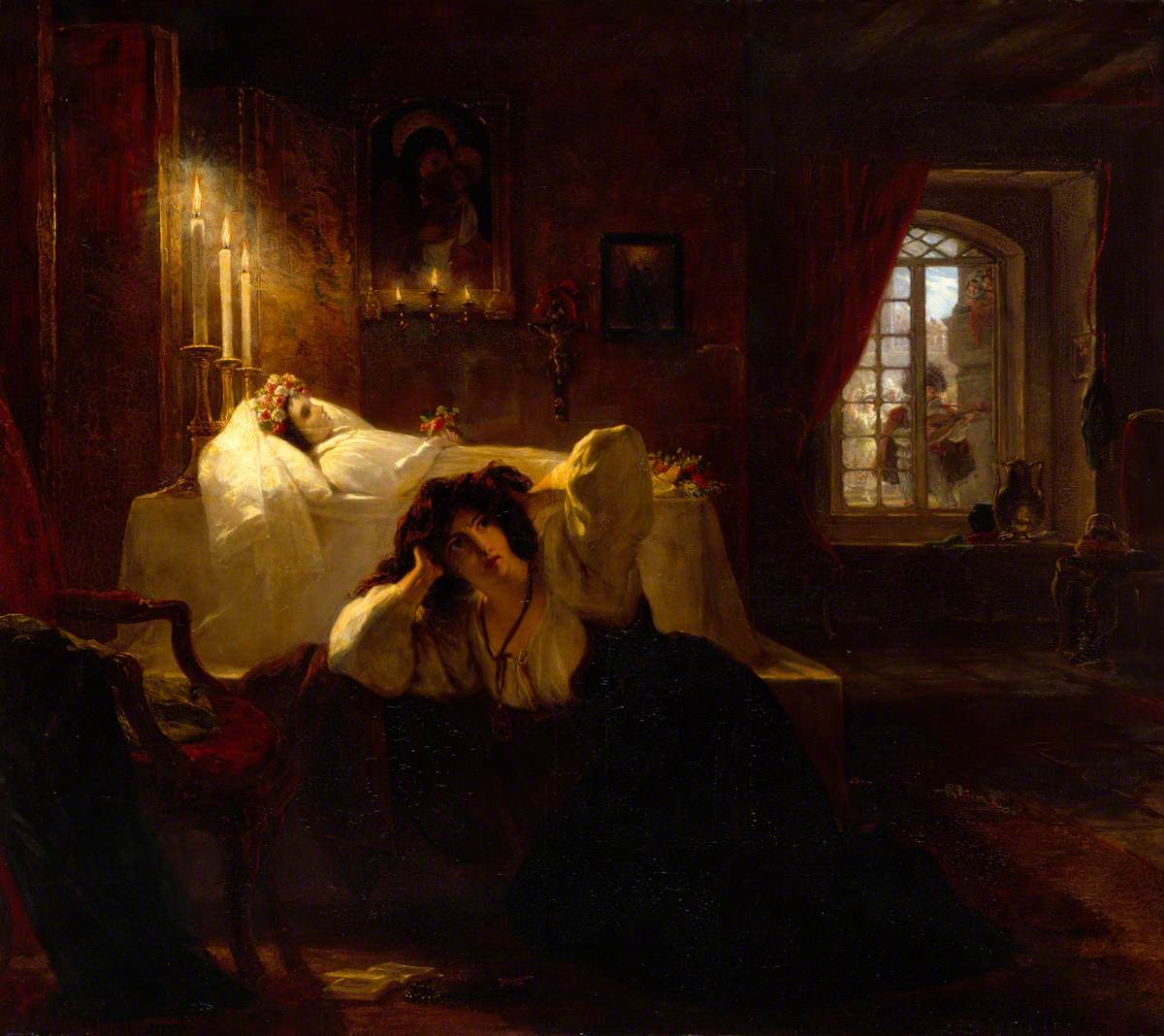
The House of Mourning by Thomas Uwins

Field of Waterloo by Samuel Drummond

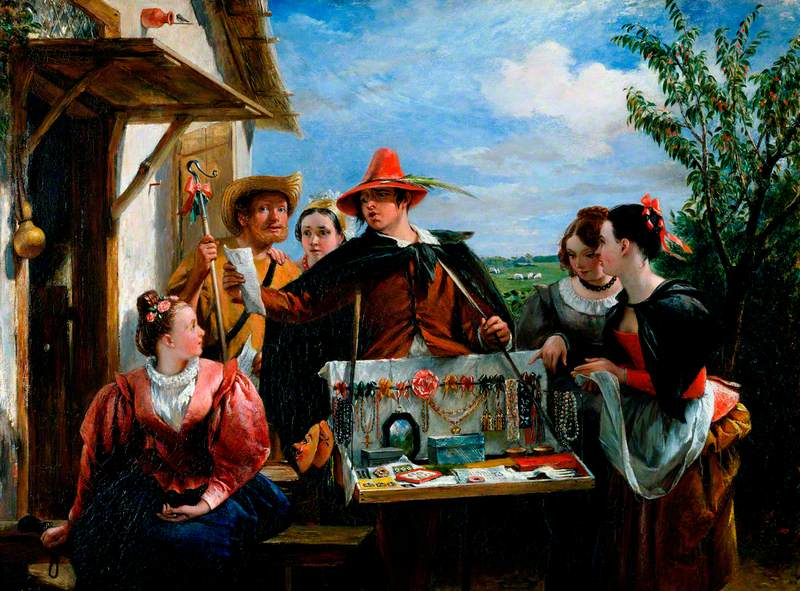
Autolycus by Charles Robert Leslie

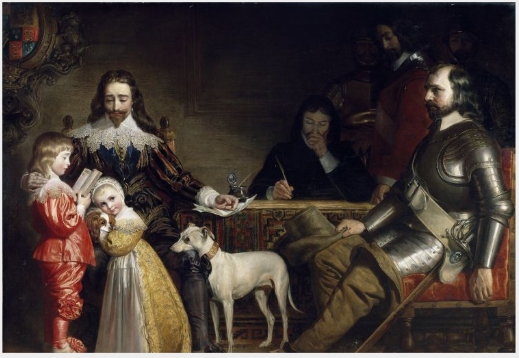
An Interview Between Charles I and Oliver Cromwell by Daniel Maclise

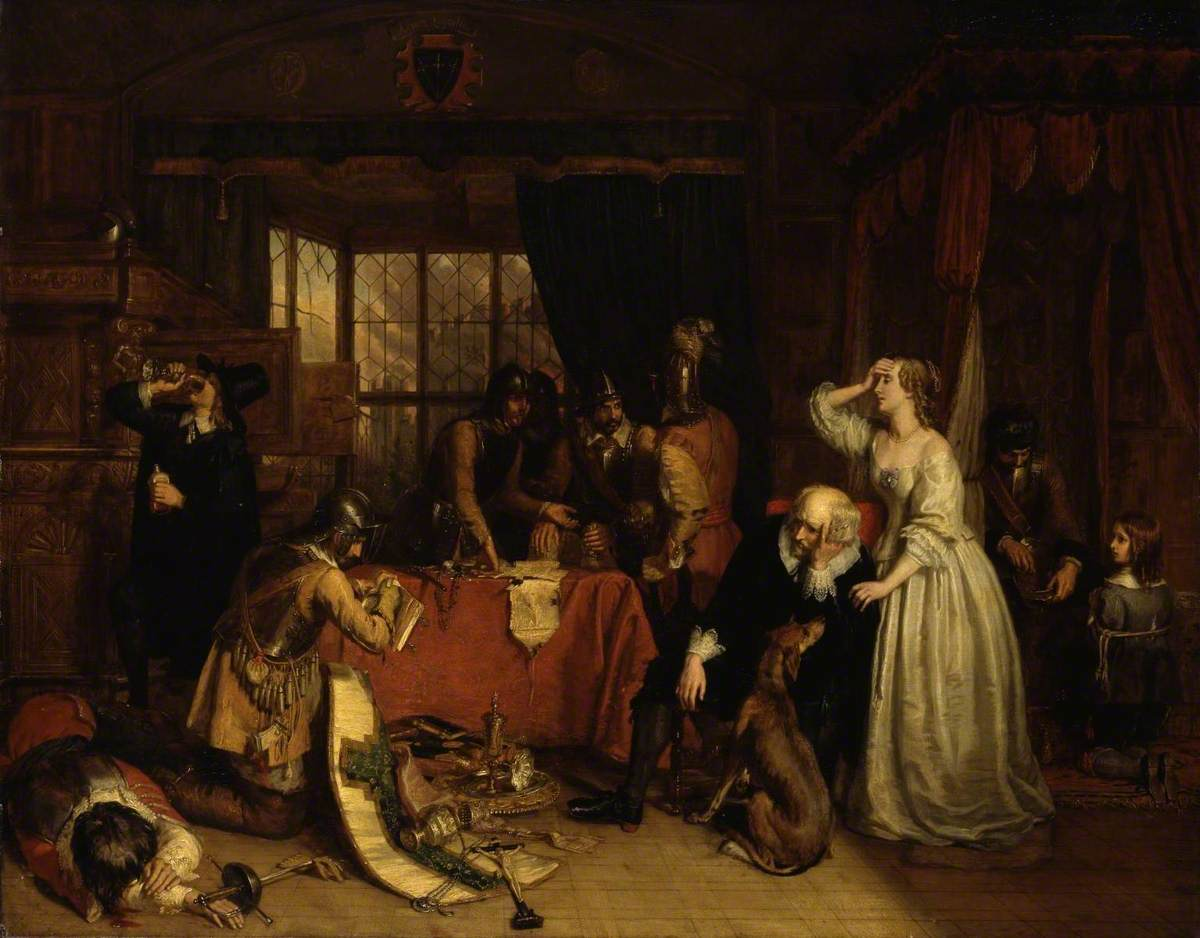
The Plundering of Basing House by Charles Landseer

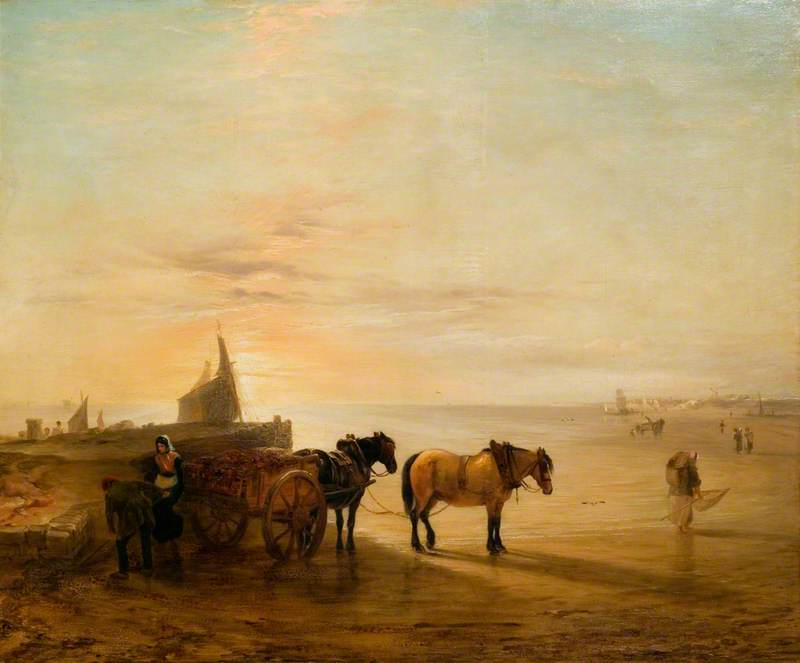
Gathering Seaweed by Frederick Richard Lee

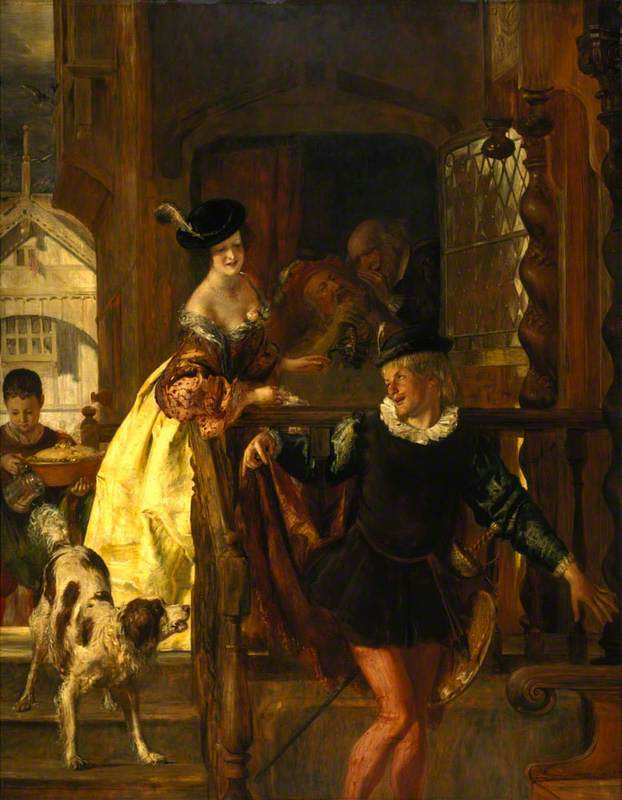
Anne Page Inviting Slender to Dinner by Thomas Duncan

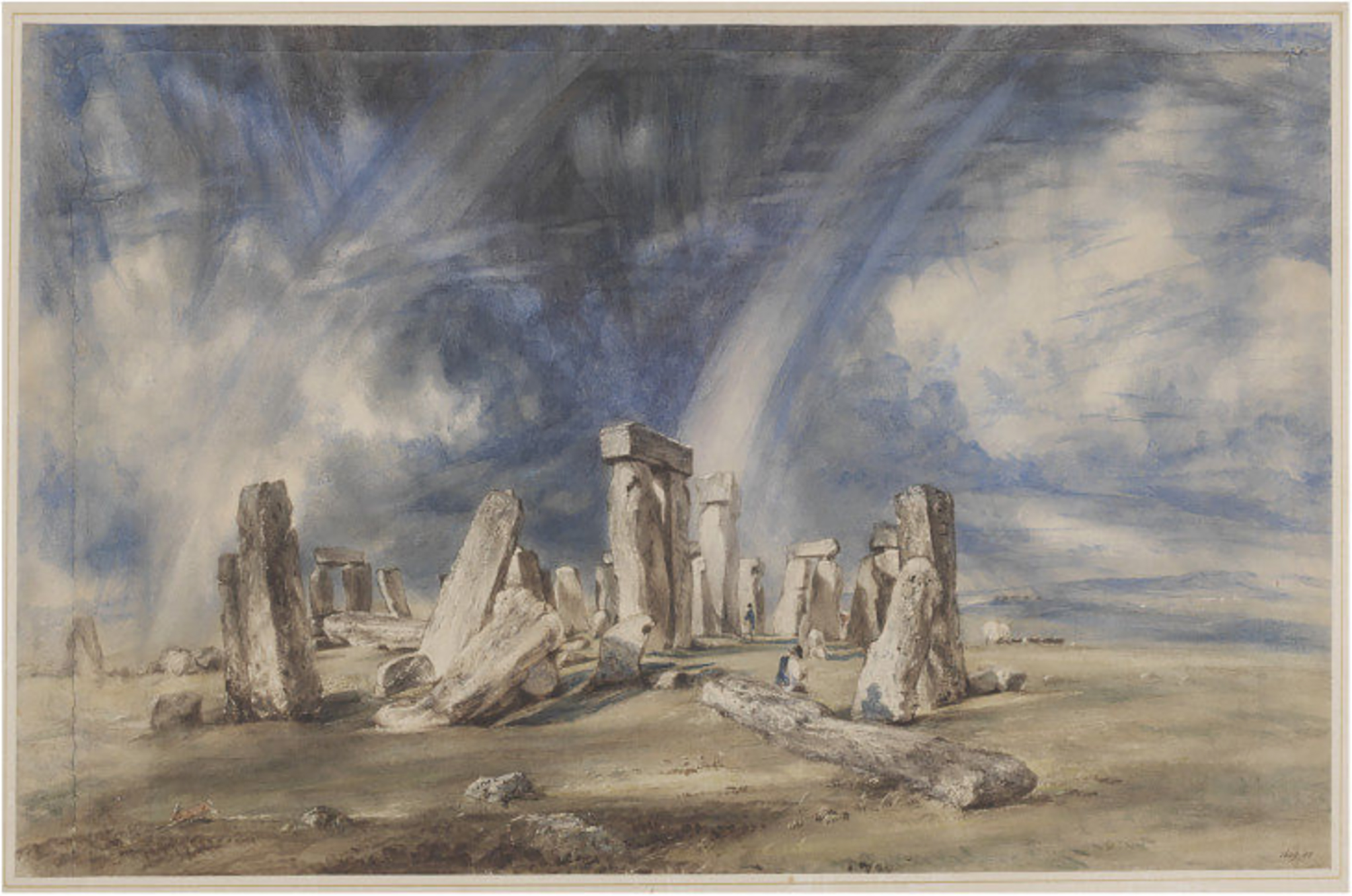
Stonehenge by John Constable

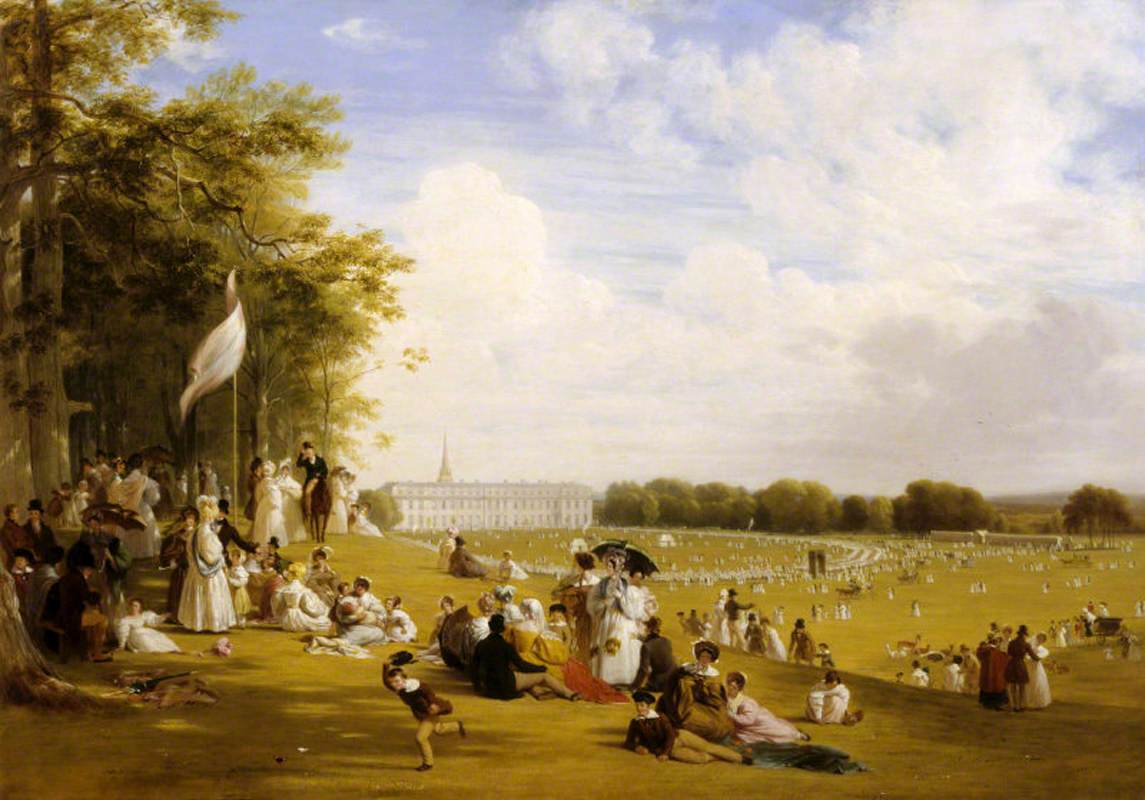
Fête in Petworth Park by William Frederick Witherington

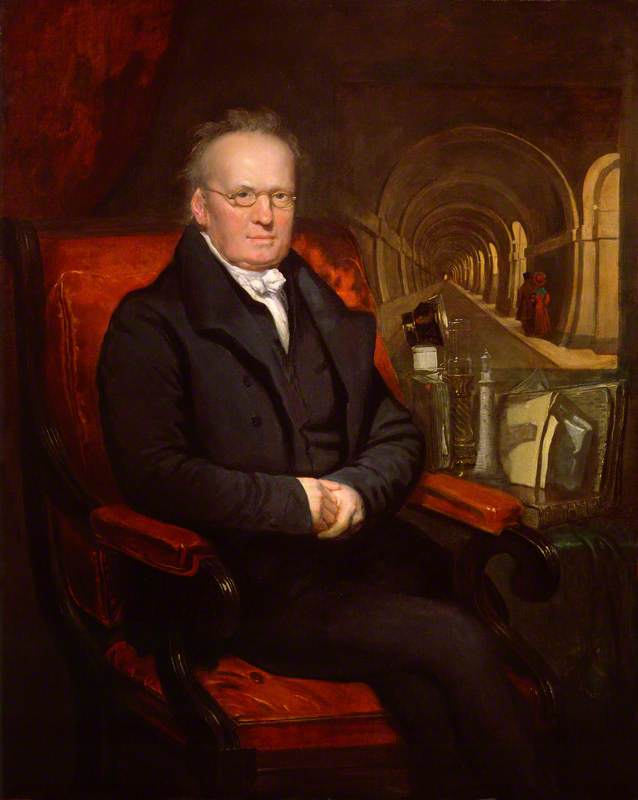
Portrait of Marc Isambard Brunel by Samuel Drummond

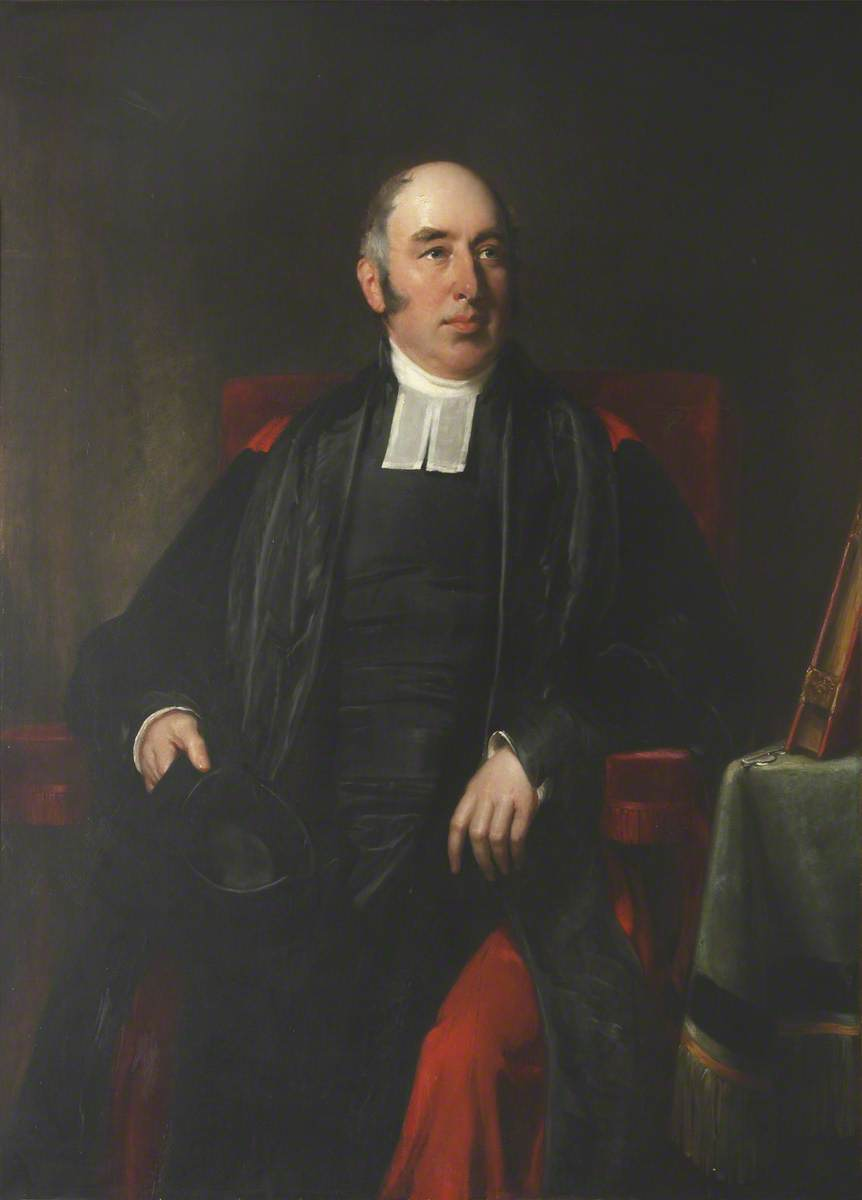
Portrait of Benjamin Parsons Symons by Henry William Pickersgill

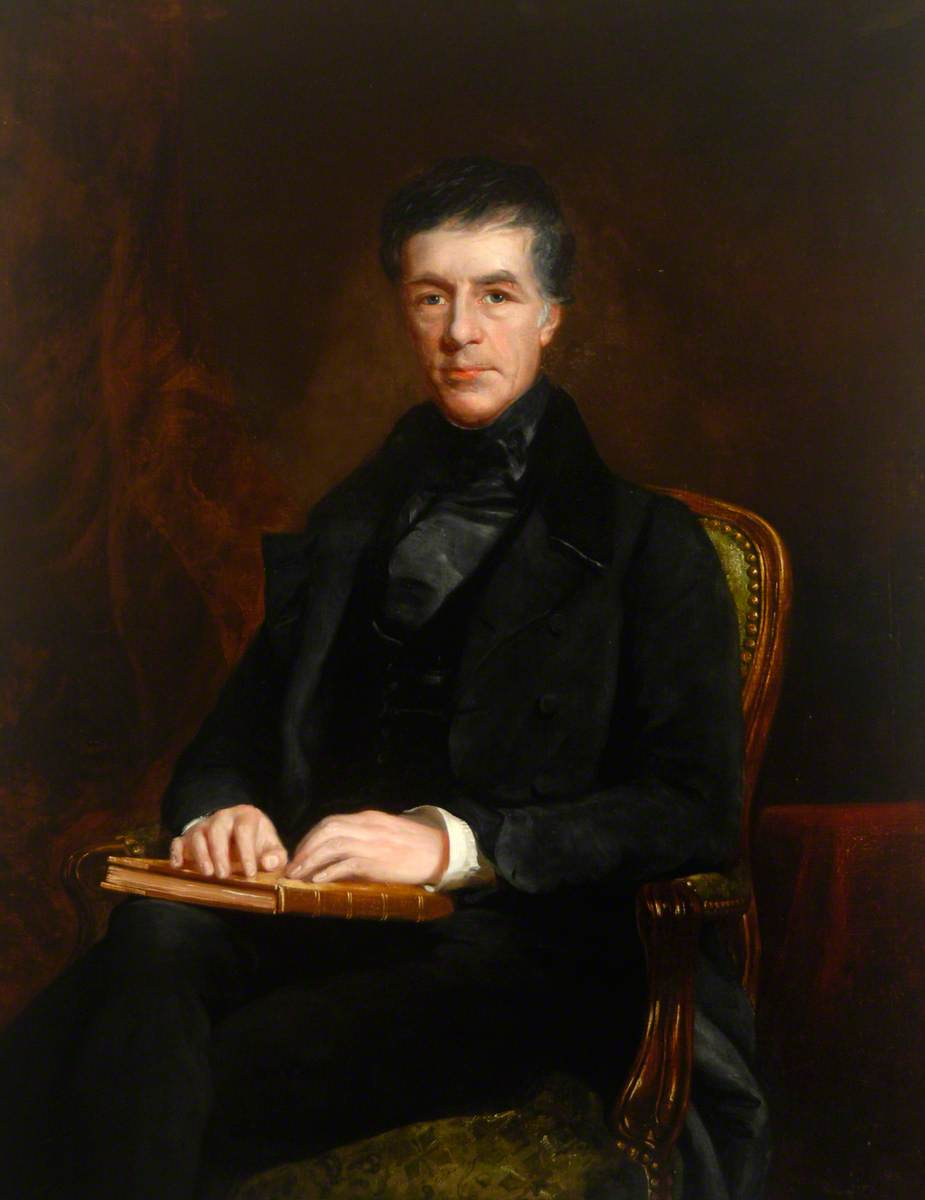
Portrait of Lord Brougham by Andrew Morton

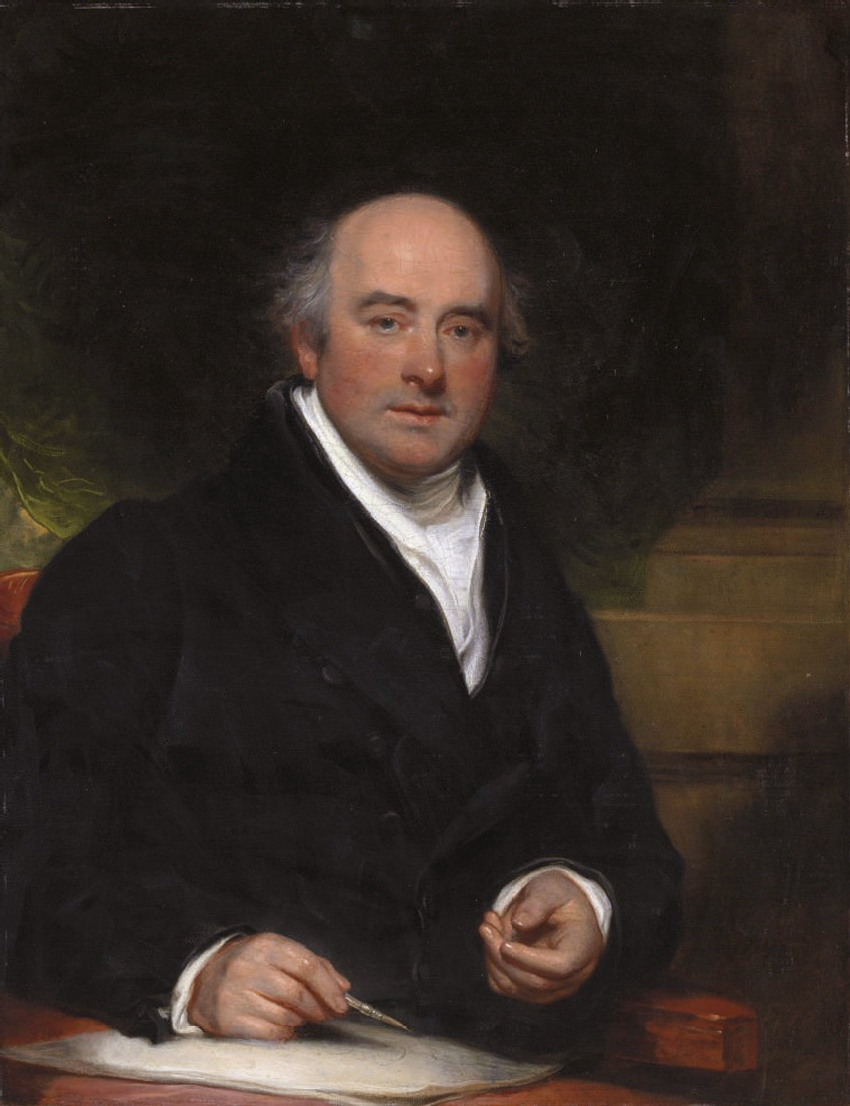
Portrait of Francis Leggatt Chantrey by Martin Archer Shee

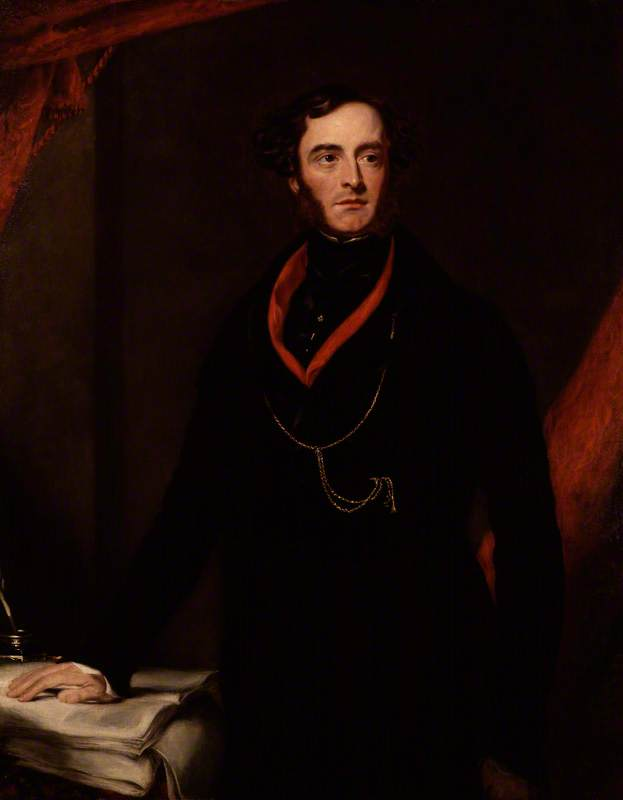
Portrait of Lord George Bentinck by Samuel Lane. A different version was displayed at the 1834 exhibition

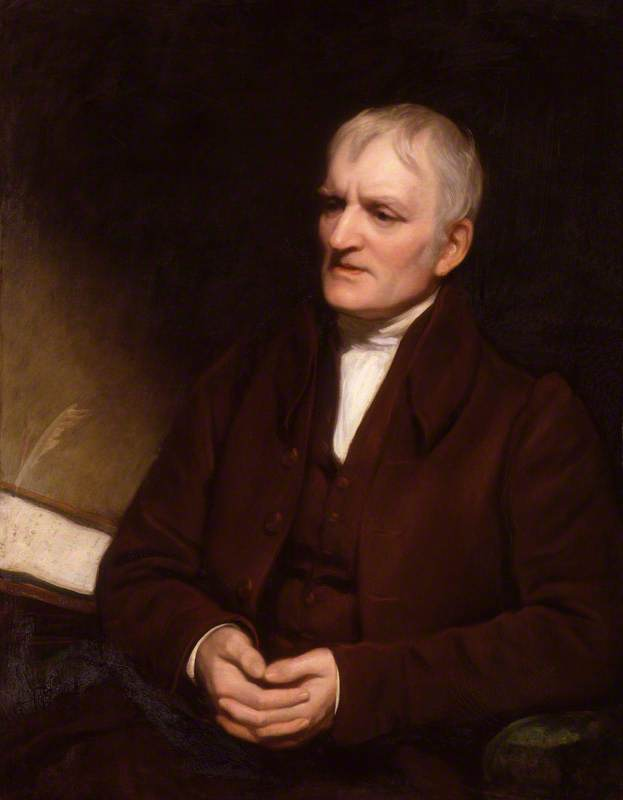
Portrait of John Dalton by Thomas Phillips

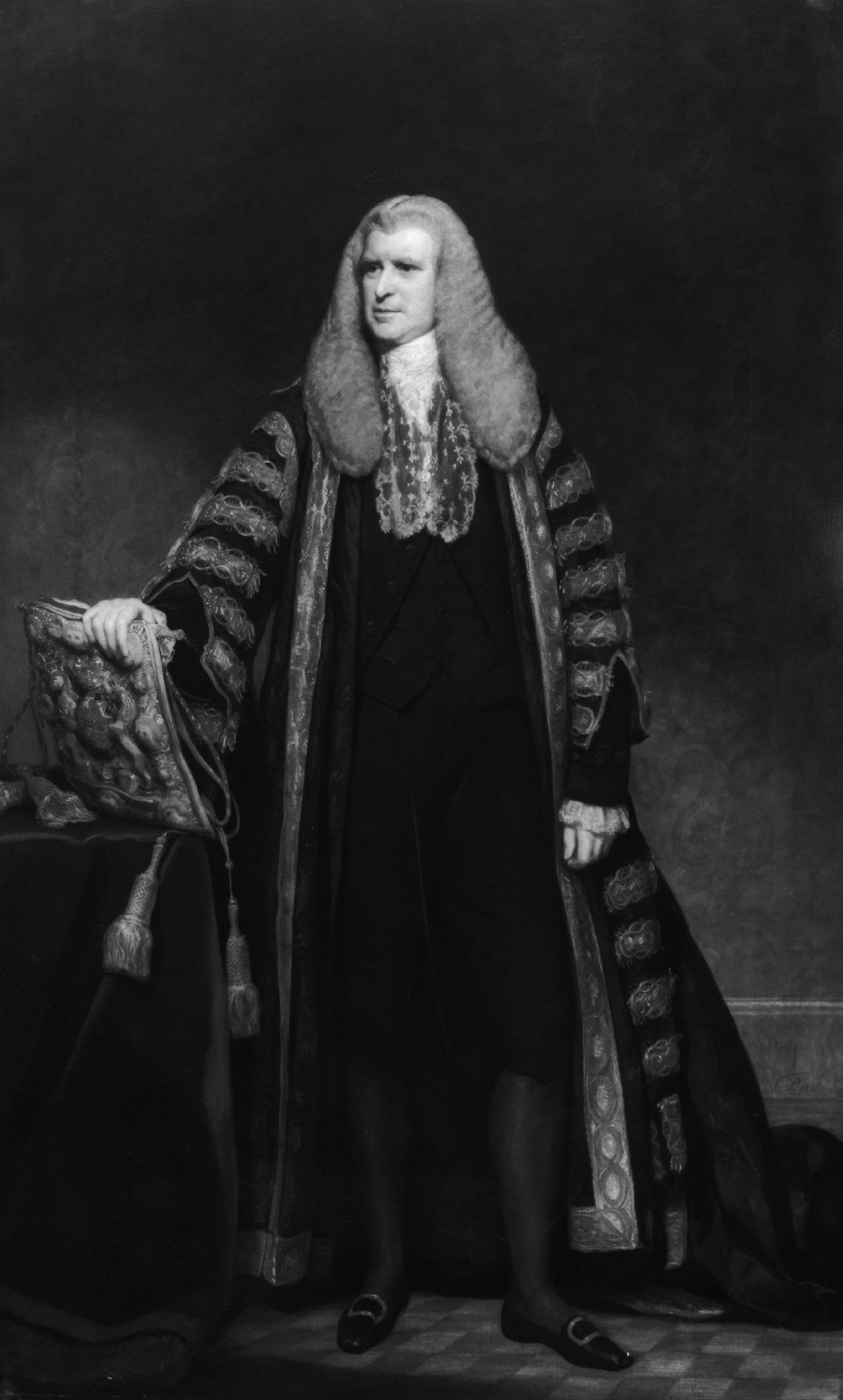
Portrait of Lord Lyndhurst by Thomas Phillips

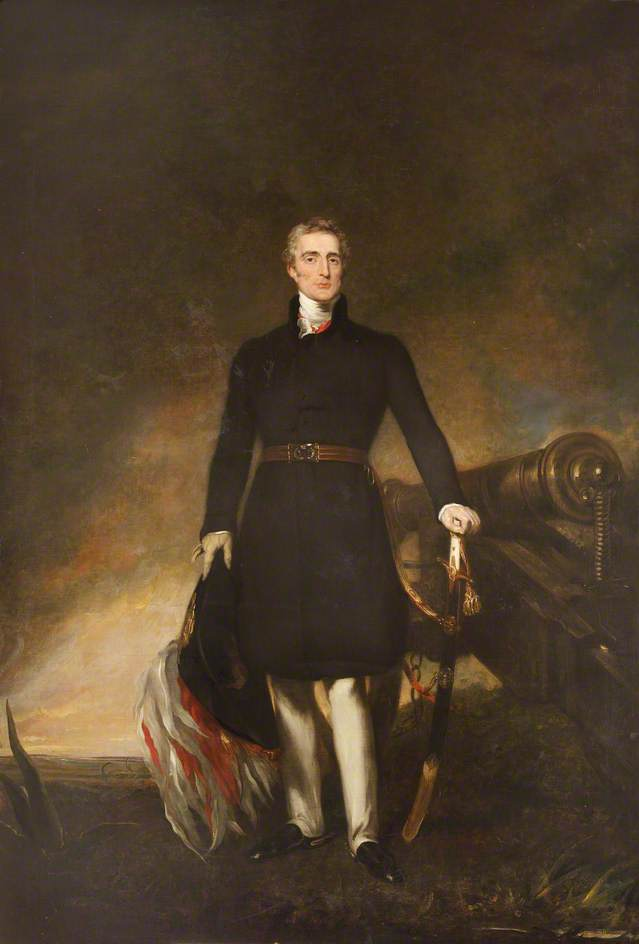
Portrait of the Duke of Wellington by John Simpson

== See also ==
- Salon of 1836, a contemporary French exhibition held at the Louvre in Paris

== Bibliography ==
- Bailey, Anthony. John Constable: A Kingdom of his Own. Random House, 2012.
- Hamilton, James. Constable: A Portrait. Hachette UK, 2022.
- Hamilton, James. Turner: A Life. Sceptre, 1998.
- Tromans, Nicholas. David Wilkie: The People's Painter. Edinburgh University Press, 2007.
