= The Peep-o'-Day Boys' Cabin =

Painting by David Wilkie

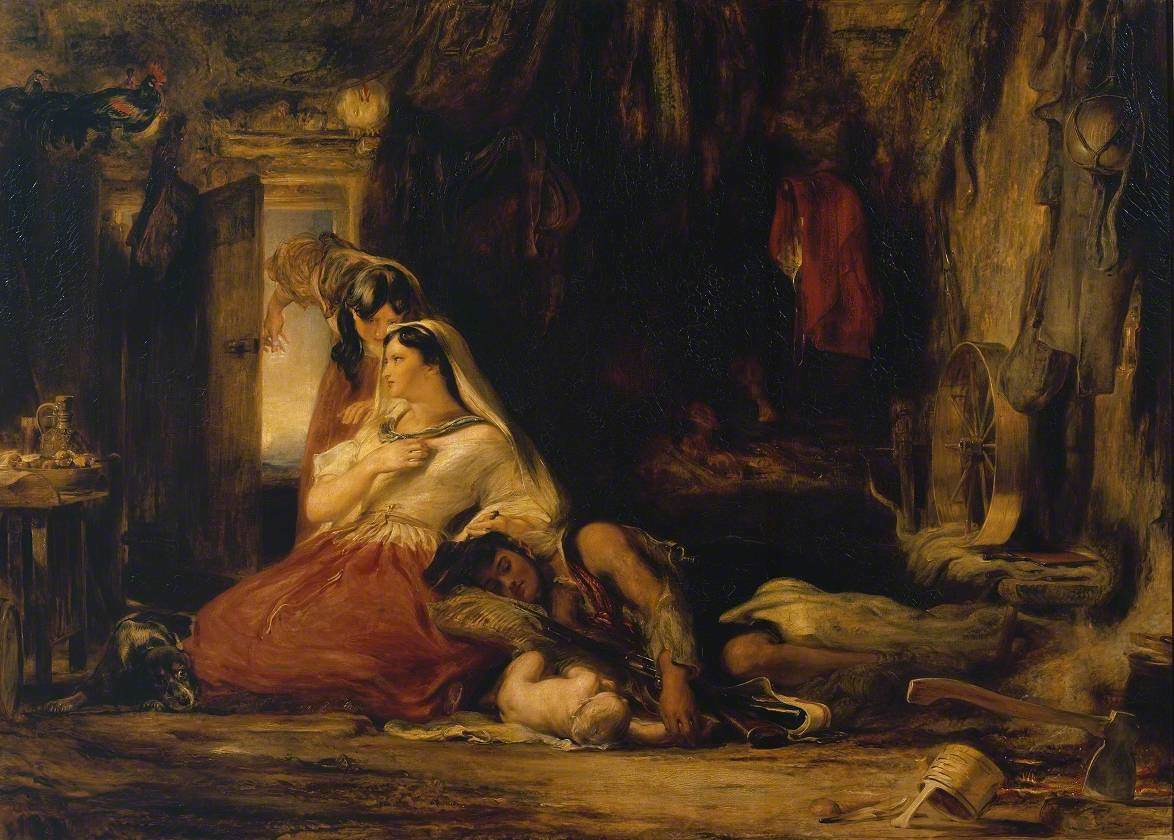
- Artist: David Wilkie
- Year: 1836
- Type: Oil on canvas, genre painting
- Dimensions: 125.7 cm × 175.3 cm (49.5 in × 69.0 in)
- Location: Tate Britain, London

The Peep-o'-Day Boys' Cabin in the West of Ireland is an 1836 genre painting by the British artist David Wilkie. It depicts a cabin in Ireland. The Peep o' Day Boys were a Protestant Agrarian movement active during the late eighteenth century.

The Scottish painter Wilkie had made his name in the Regency era, producing genre works that harked back to the Dutch old masters of the seventeenth century. He later travelled in Continental Europe and expanded his range into history paintings and portraits.

Wilkie toured the West of Ireland in 1835, which provided inspiration for two paintings, this and the later Irish Whiskey Still in 1840. It features a number of authentic details from Irish rural life, although it also includes a Catholic rosary shown in a supposedly Protestant dwelling. However, the Anglo-Irish Irish novelist Maria Edgeworth, a friend of Wilkie, felt that the expressions and clothing lacked a specific "Hibernian" character.

The painting was displayed at the Royal Academy Exhibition of 1836 at Somerset House. Acquired by the art collector Robert Vernon, it was donated by him to the National Gallery in 1847 as part of the Vernon Gift. Today it is in the collection of the Tate Britain in Pimlico.

== Bibliography ==
- Jones, Katherine & Duff, David. Scotland, Ireland, and the Romantic Aesthetic. Bucknell University Press, 2007.
- Kinmonth, Claudia. Irish Rural Interiors in Art. Yale University Press, 2006.
- Solkin, David H. Painting Out of the Ordinary: Modernity and the Art of Everyday Life in Early Nineteenth-century Britain. Yale University Press, 2009.
- Tromans, Nicholas. David Wilkie: The People's Painter. Edinburgh University Press, 2007.
