= The Battle of Trafalgar (Stanfield) =

Painting by Clarkson Stanfield

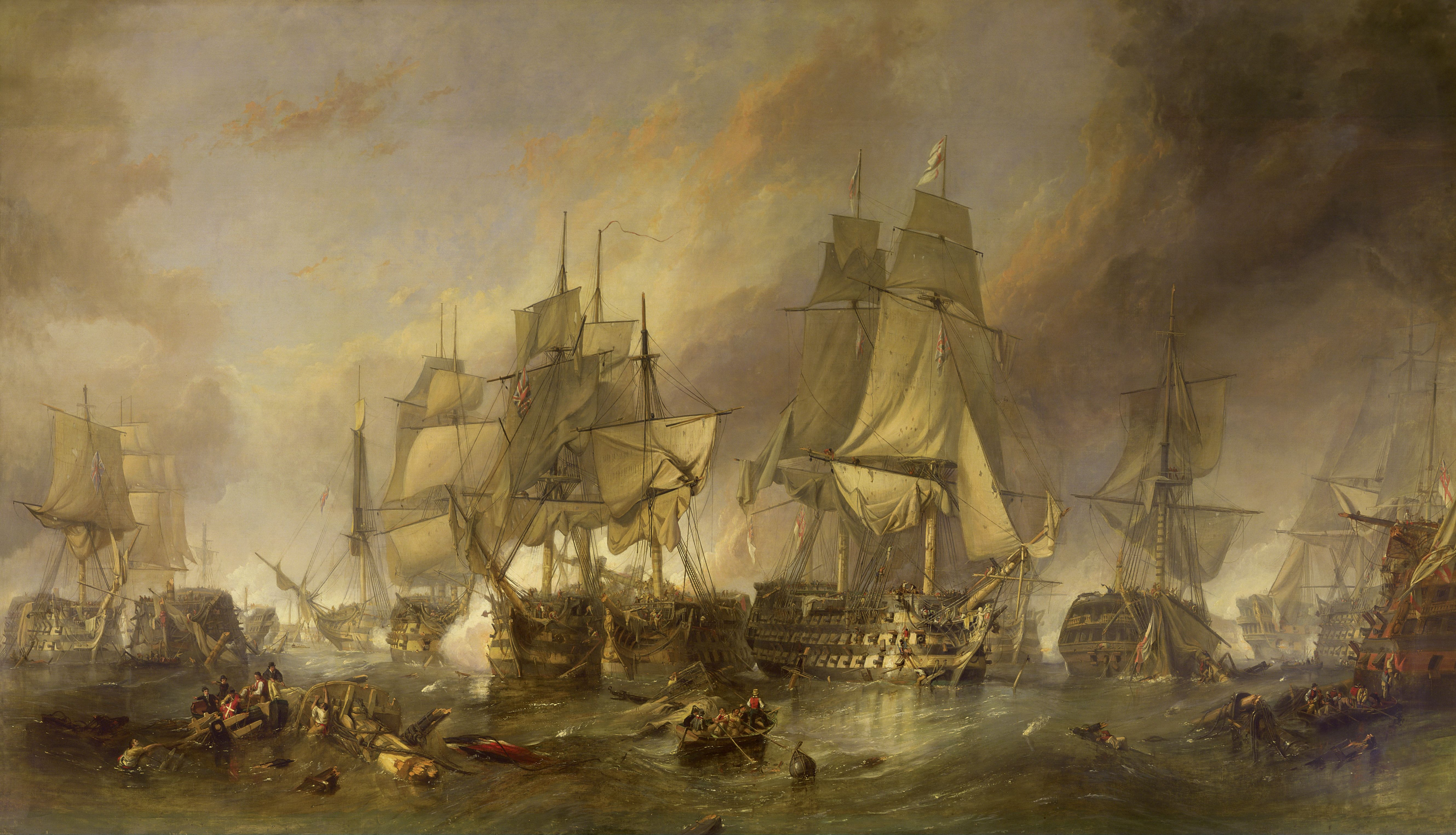
- Artist: Clarkson Stanfield
- Year: 1836
- Medium: Oil on canvas, history painting
- Dimensions: 270 cm × 480 cm (110 in × 190 in)
- Location: United Service Club, London

The Battle of Trafalgar is an 1836 history painting by the British artist Clarkson Stanfield. It depicts the 1805 naval Battle of Trafalgar in which the Royal Navy led by Horatio Nelson, 1st Viscount Nelson defeated a combined Franco-Spanish fleet during the Napoleonic Wars. The painting was commissioned by the United Service Club and represented a major milestone in Clarkson's career.

The work was exhibited at the Royal Academy's Summer Exhibition of 1836. An engraving based on Stanfield's work was produced by William Miller, a copy of which is held by the National Maritime Museum.

== Bibliography ==
- Harrington, Peter. British Artists and War: The Face of Battle in Paintings and Prints, 1700-1914. Greenhill Books, 1993.
- Tracy, Nicholas. Britannia’s Palette: The Arts of Naval Victory. McGill-Queen's Press, 2007.
- Van der Merwe, Pieter & Took, Roger. The Spectacular career of Clarkson Stanfield. Tyne and Wear County Council Museums, 1979.
