= Pen, Brush and Chisel =

Painting by Edwin Landseer

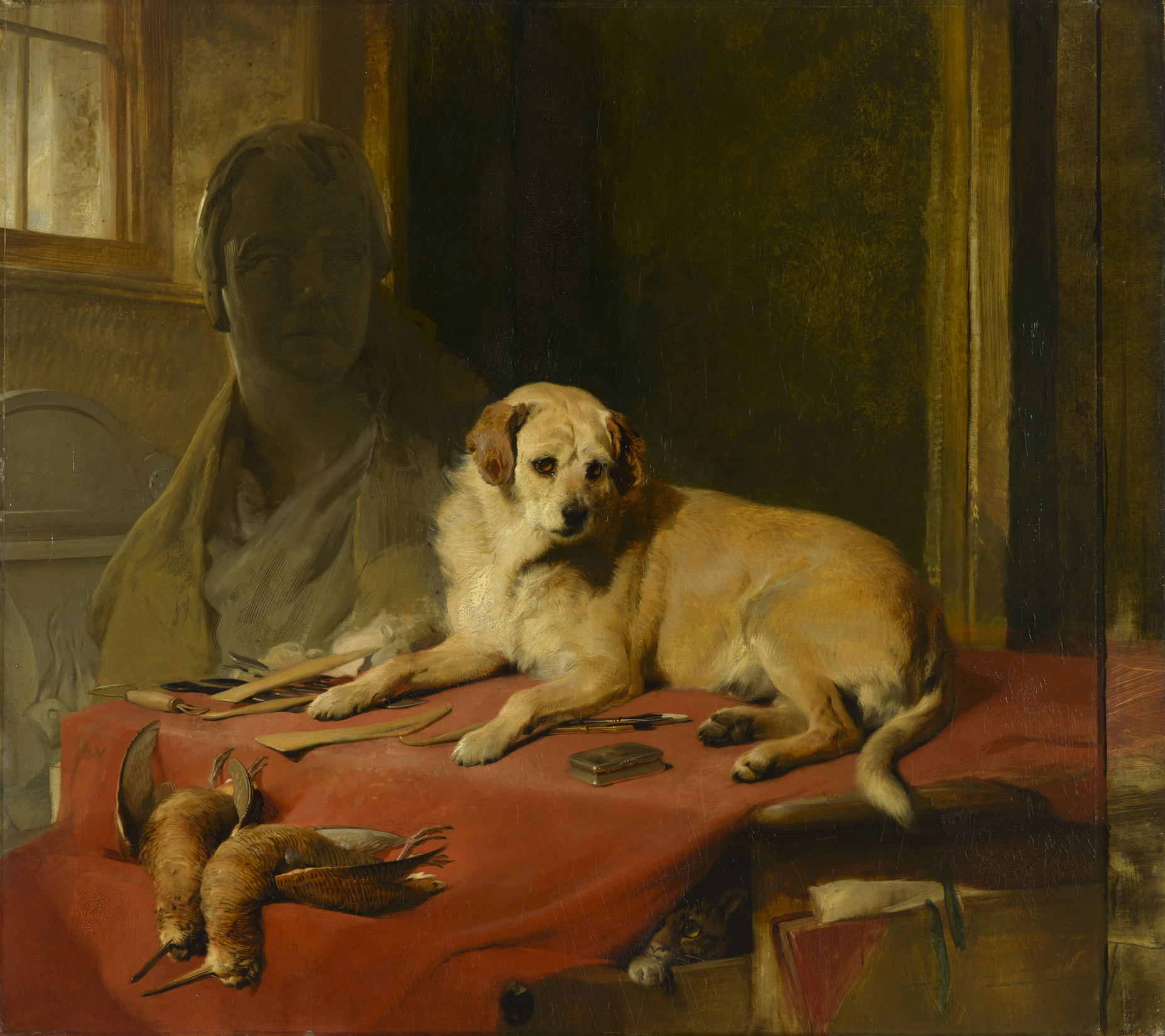
- Artist: Edwin Landseer
- Year: 1836
- Type: Oil on canvas, portrait painting
- Dimensions: 271 cm × 289 cm (106.7 in × 113.7 in)
- Location: Royal Collection

Pen, Brush and Chisel is an 1836 oil painting by the British artist Edwin Landseer. It depicts a scene in the studio of the sculptor Francis Chantrey, probably inspired by rather than directly based on the sculptor's real studio in Pimlico. Dominating the painting is Chantrey's dog Mustard, who had been a gift from the writer Walter Scott. The painting is also known by the alternative titles Mustard, the Son of Pepper and The Studio of Sir Francis Chantrey.

Aside from Mustard, the scene is filled with allusions to life and career including unfinished bust of Walter Scott and the two woodcock appear to refer to a famous shooting incident in which he killed a brace of the birds with a single shot. A cat is shown peering out of a desk drawer, his apparent threat to the birds has put Mustard on alert. The picture was displayed at the Royal Academy Exhibition of 1836 held at Somerset House in London. It was given to Queen Victoria in 1842 by Chantrey's widow and remains in the Royal Collection today.

== Bibliography ==
- Gibson, Robin. The Face in the Corner: Animals in Portraits from the Collections of the National Portrait Gallery. National Portrait Gallery Publications, 1998.
- Ormond, Richard. Sir Edwin Landseer. Philadelphia Museum of Art, 1981.
