= Godiva Preparing to Ride through Coventry =

1833 painting by George Jones

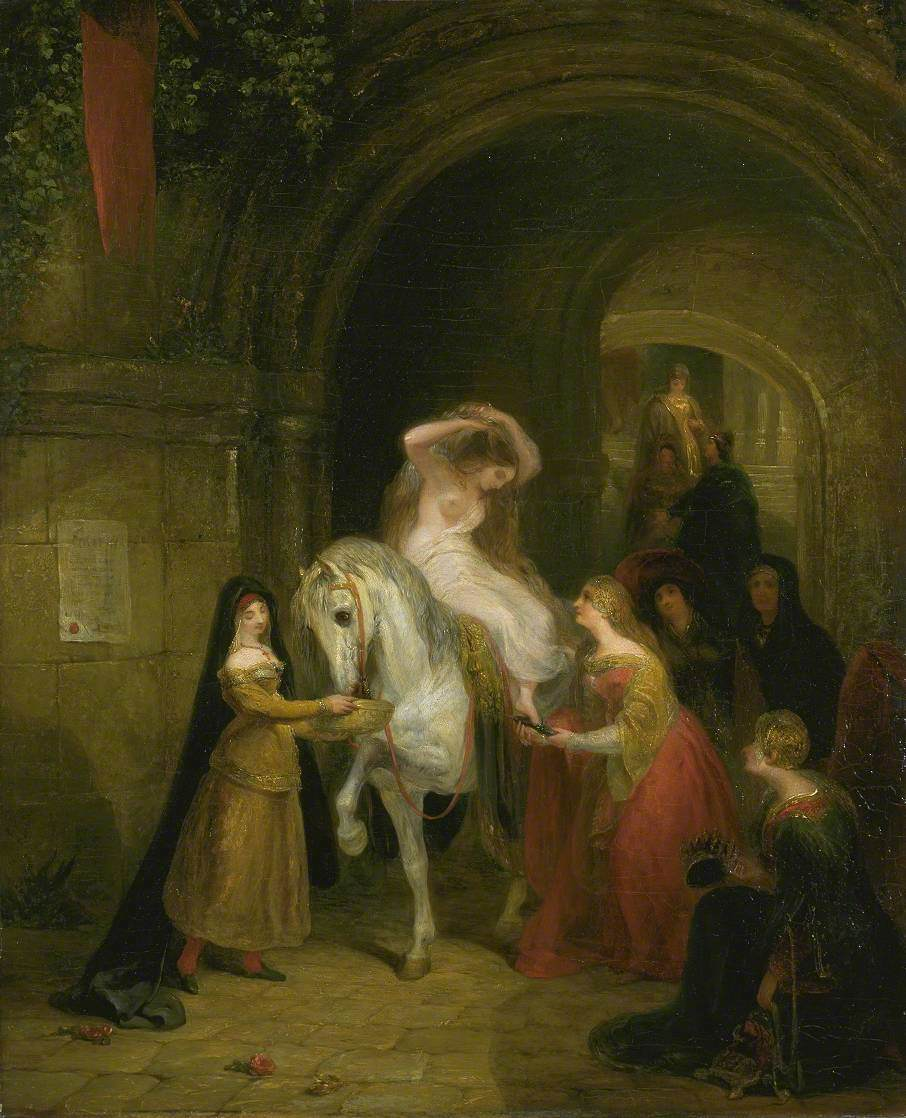
- Artist: George Jones
- Year: 1833
- Type: Oil on canvas, history painting
- Dimensions: 74.9 cm × 61 cm (29.5 in × 24 in)
- Location: Tate Britain, London

Godiva Preparing to Ride through Coventry is an oil on canvas history painting by the British artist George Jones, from 1833. It depicts Lady Godiva, the eleventh century Anglo-Saxon noblewoman known for her naked ride through Coventry. Jones was a veteran of the Napoleonic Wars and best known for his battle paintings. The painting was exhibited at the Royal Academy's Summer Exhibition at Somerset House in 1833. A review in The Times considered it "a picture of great merit; fanciful, cleverly imagined, and painted with no mean skill".

Today the painting is in the collection of the Tate Britain in Pimlico, having been gifted to the nation by Robert Vernon in 1847 as part of the Vernon Gift. The preparatory sketch for the work is now in the collection of the Royal Academy. Three years later Jones produced another painting of the story Godiva's Return return which he exhibited at the Royal Academy in 1836.

== Bibliography ==
- Clarke, Ronald Aquilla & Day, Patrick A. E. Lady Godiva: Images of a Legend in Art & Society. Leisure Services, Arts and Museums Division, 1982.
