= Stonehenge (painting) =

Painting by John Constable

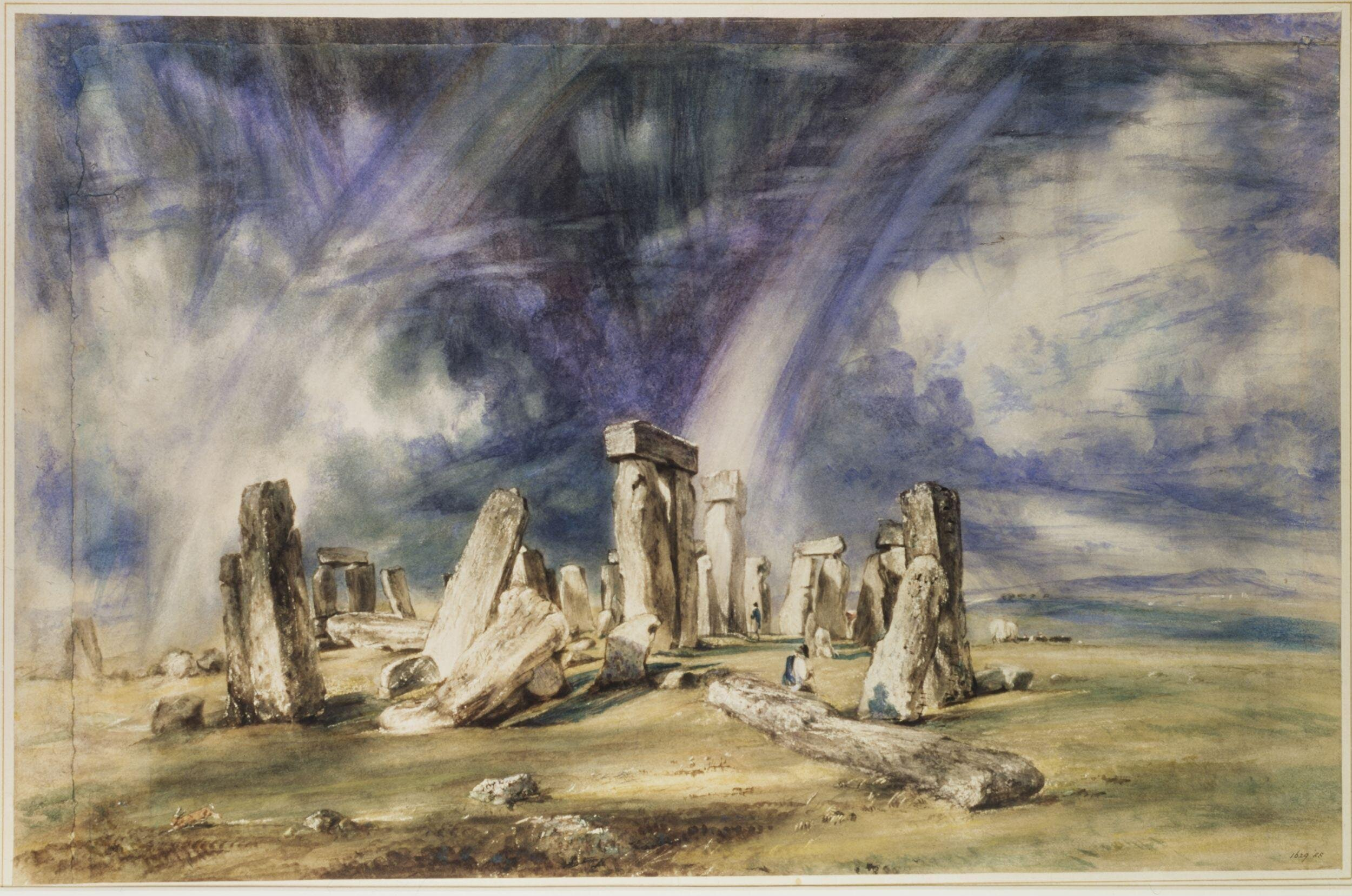
- Artist: John Constable
- Year: 1835
- Type: Watercolour, landscape painting
- Dimensions: 38.7 cm × 59.1 cm (15.2 in × 23.3 in)
- Location: Victoria and Albert Museum, London

Stonehenge is an 1835 landscape painting by the British artist John Constable. A watercolour it features a view of Stonehenge in Wiltshire. Its expressive use of sky matches some of the experimental oil sketches he produced late in his career.

The work was displayed at the Royal Academy Exhibition of 1836 at Somerset House in London. The painting is now in the collection of the Victoria and Albert Museum, having been presented by the artist's daughter Isabel in 1888 as part of the Constable Bequest.

In 2025 it was lent to the Tate Britain for the exhibition Turner and Constable: Rivals and Originals along with another watercolour Old Sarum.

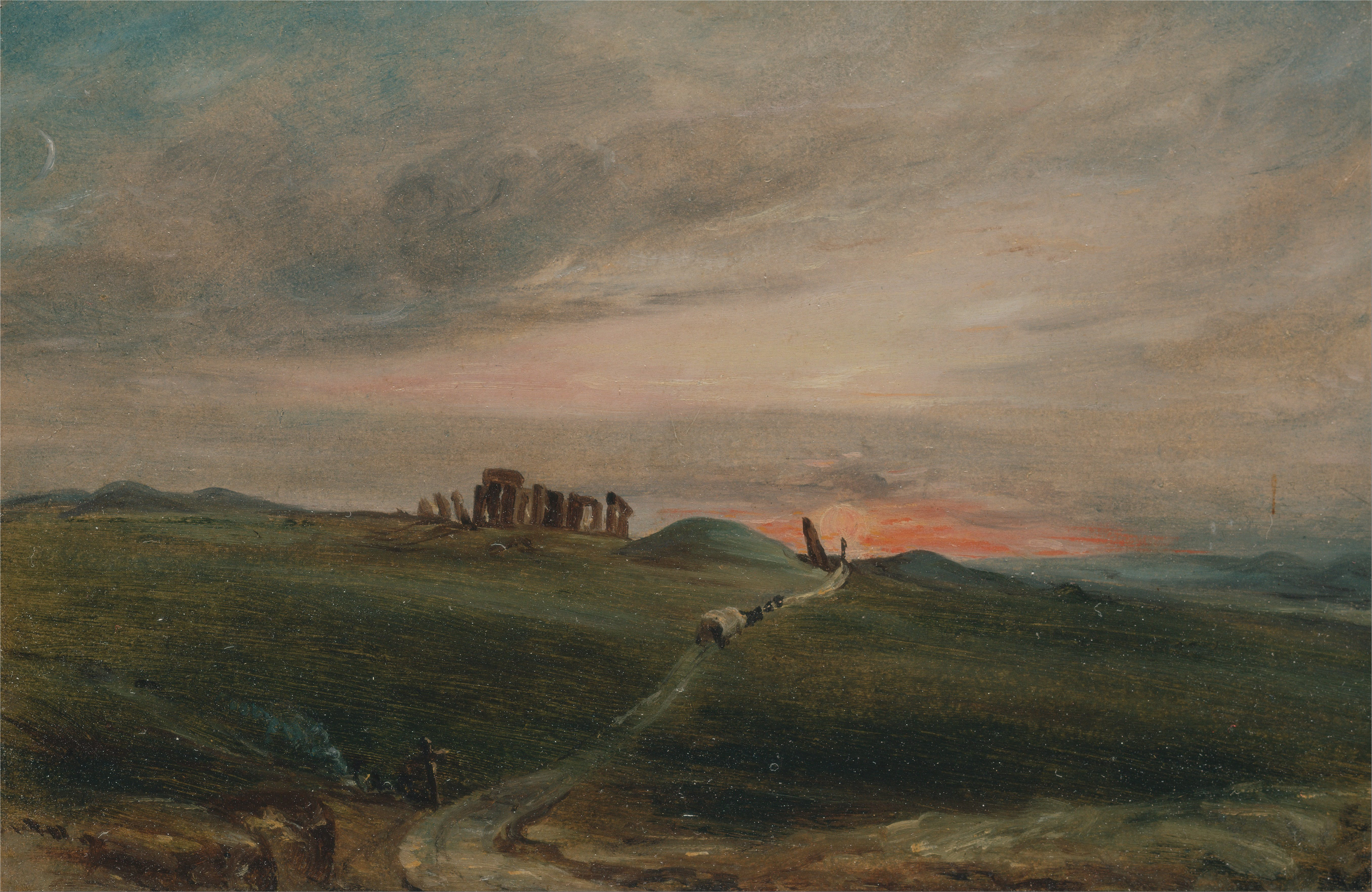
Stonehenge at Sunset, 1836

Constable also produced a small oil painting around this time, known as Stonehenge at Sunset, now in the Yale Center for British Art.

== See also ==
- List of paintings by John Constable

== Bibliography ==
- Concannon, Amy (ed.) Turner and Constable: Rivals and Originals.Tate Publishing, 2025.
