= United Service Club =

Gentlemen's club in London, England (1815–1978)

Coordinates: 51°30′26.61″N 0°7′54.86″W

- Founded: 1815
- Defunct: 1978
- Fate: Closed
- Headquarters: 116 Pall Mall, London, England

The United Service Club was a London gentlemen's club founded in 1815 for the use of senior officers in the British Army and Royal Navy – those above the rank of Major or Lieutenant Commander – and the club was accordingly known to its members as "The Senior". The club closed in 1978.

Because of its emphasis on senior officers, it was considered the most prestigious of London's military clubs – reflected partly in its entry fees, which were the highest of any London club in the 1880s, although there has been some speculation this was a device to limit the number of new members.

== History ==
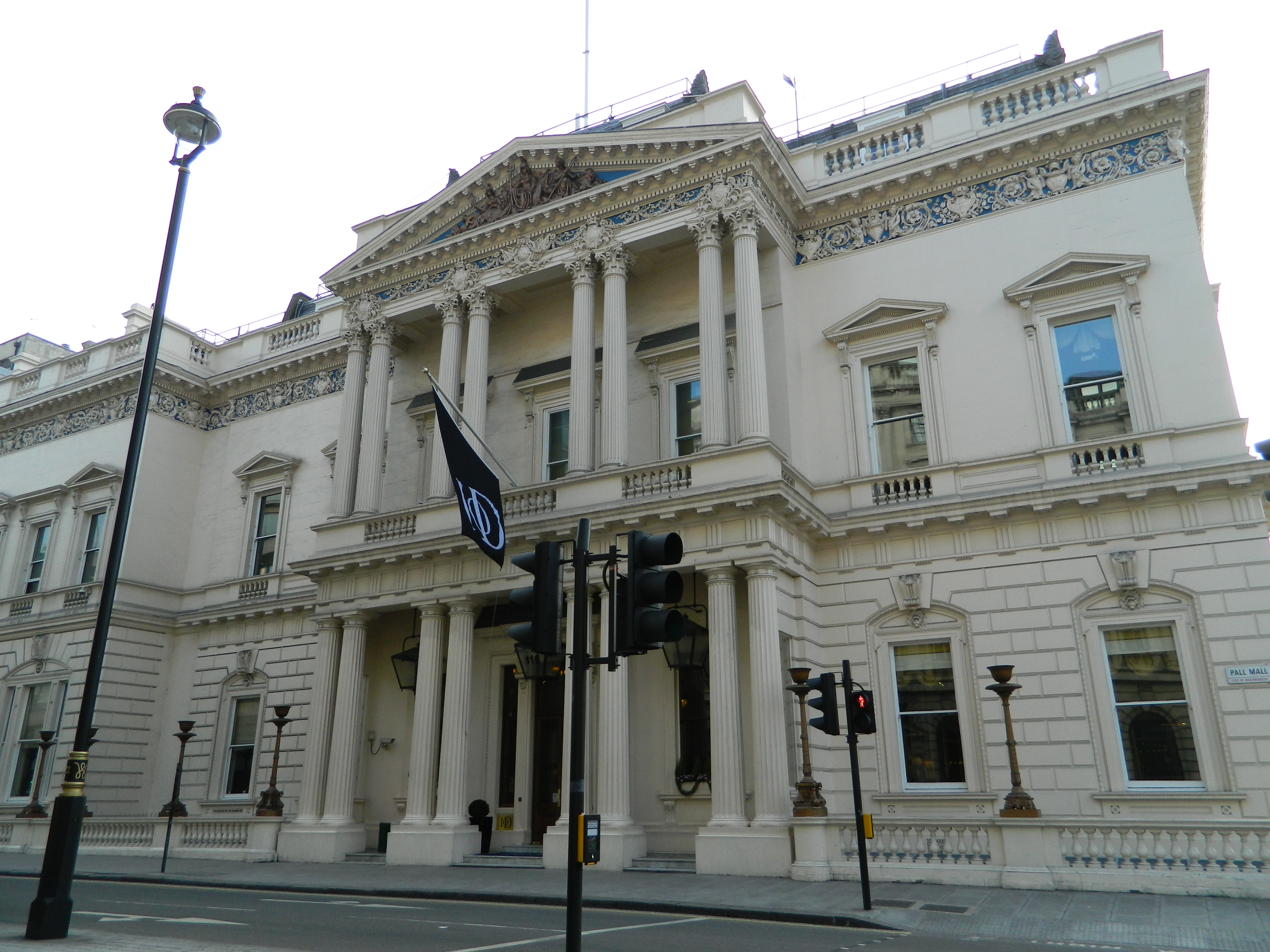
Former clubhouse at 116 Pall Mall, now used by the Institute of Directors

The club was founded by a group of senior army officers, led by General Thomas Graham. The year after it was founded, in 1816, the Club moved into its first premises in Albemarle Street. Three years later, in 1819, it moved to Charles Street and in 1828 to a purpose-built clubhouse at 116 Pall Mall, designed by the noted architect John Nash. The club house, on the corner with Waterloo Place, was built between 1826 and 1828. Its style, displaying military friezes along the top of the building, was later mirrored by the Athenaeum opposite. Both buildings had a stone step outside, facing each other across Waterloo Place. These were for the use of the Duke of Wellington, who was a member of both clubs and rode everywhere, rather than use a carriage. These steps still stand today. The building was later altered and extended by Decimus Burton in 1858–9, and then again by the firm of Thompson and Walford, in the years 1912–13 and 1929–30. It was built on the site of the former Carlton House.

In 1892 members were concerned that the club was facing financial difficulties and elected to allow lesser ranks – down to Army Captains and Naval Lieutenants – as members. This led to a significant increase in membership and in 1910 the Club expanded its premises into the existing Nos. 118 and 119 Pall Mall.

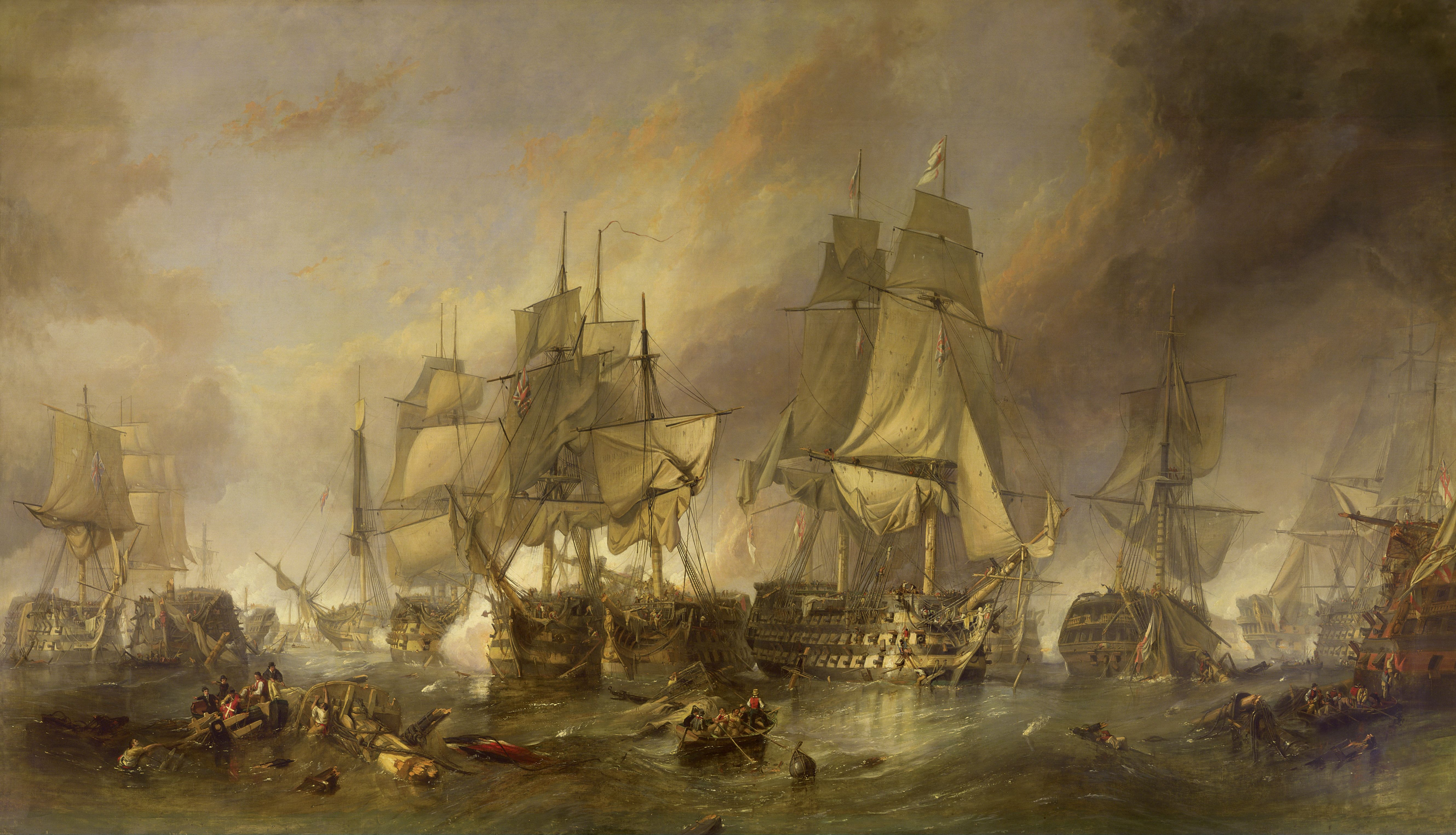
The Battle of Trafalgar by Clarkson Stanfield. An 1836 painting commissioned by the club

Despite the club's prestige, like many other clubs it ran into serious financial difficulties in the 1970s, and was forced to close in 1978. The building was bought by the Institute of Directors (IoD), and a condition of the sale was that the IoD would retain all of the club's original fixtures and fittings (including the Duke's step), which it still does today. However, although the building survives substantially intact, the old club building makes up only part of the IoD headquarters on Pall Mall, whose complex encompasses several neighbouring buildings which were never part of the club.

== See also ==
- List of London's gentlemen's clubs
