= The Plundering of Basing House =

Painting by Charles Landseer

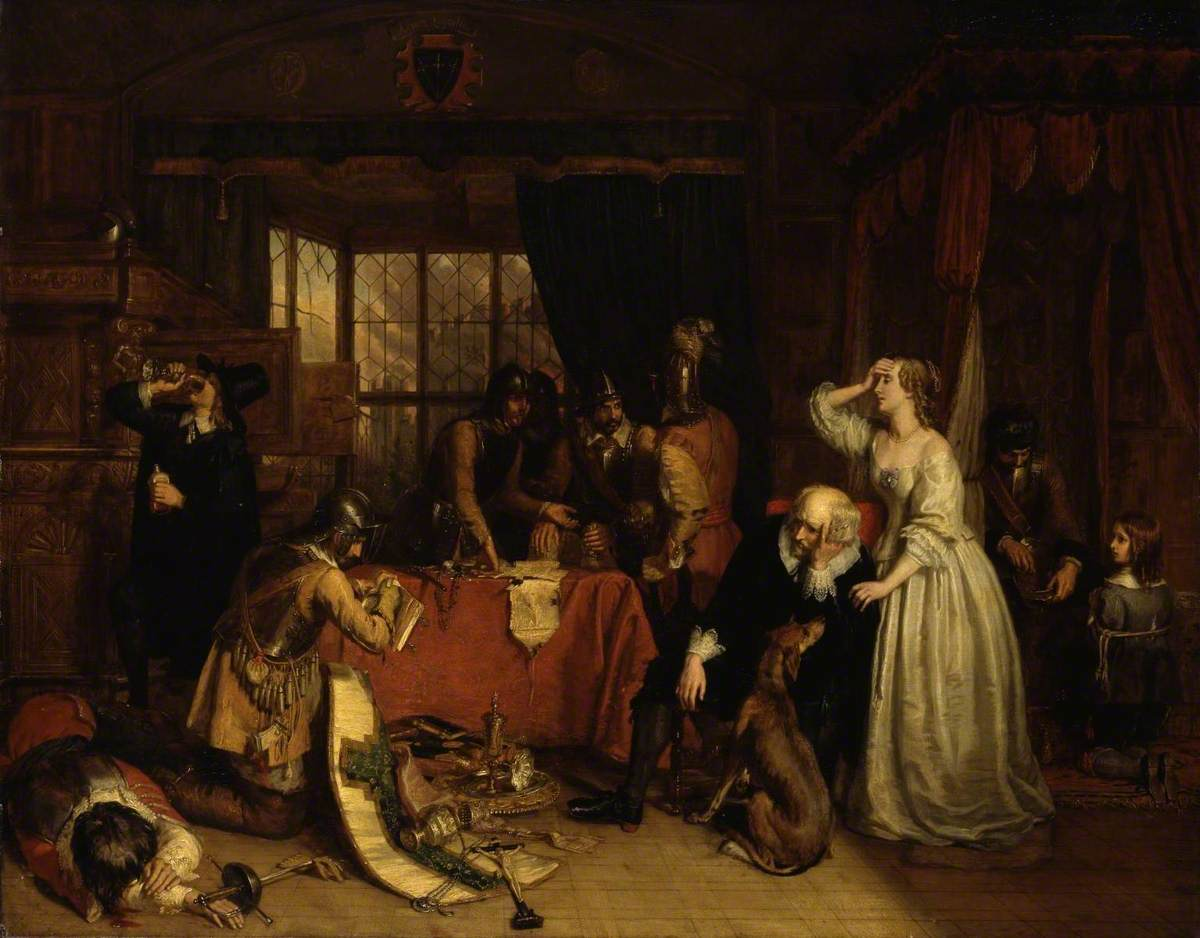
- Artist: Charles Landseer
- Year: 1836
- Type: Oil on canvas, history painting
- Dimensions: 100.3 cm × 125.7 cm (39.5 in × 49.5 in)
- Location: Tate Britain, London

The Plundering of Basing House is an 1836 history painting by the British artist Charles Landseer depicting a scene from the English Civil War. It portrays the ransacking of Basing House in Hampshire in October 1645. Long a Royalist stronghold, it was stormed by troops of the New Model Army under Oliver Cromwell. It is one of the best-known paintings of the conflict.

Landseer was the elder brother of the celebrated animal painter Edwin Landseer and was known for his depictions of scenes from British history. The work was displayed at the Royal Academy Exhibition of 1836 at Somerset House in London, where it earned critical praise. The painting was given to the National Gallery in 1859 by the chemist and art collector Jacob Bell. Today it is in the possession of the Tate Britain.

== Bibliography ==
- Mendlesohn, Farah. Creating Memory: Historical Fiction and the English Civil Wars. Springer International Publishing, 2020.
- Neher, Allister. Art and Anatomy in Nineteenth Century Britain. Cambridge Scholars Publishing, 2022.
