= The Duke of Wellington Writing Dispatches =

Painting by David Wilkie

- Artist: David Wilkie
- Year: 1836
- Type: Oil on panel, history painting
- Dimensions: 64.6 cm × 55.2 cm (25.4 in × 21.7 in)
- Location: Aberdeen Art Gallery, Aberdeen

The Duke of Wellington Writing Dispatches is an 1836 history painting by the British artist David Wilkie. It shows the Duke of Wellington the night before the Battle of Waterloo writing to the King of France Louis XVIII who was then in exile in Ghent by lamplight to inform him of the coming battle.

The painting was commissioned by James Willoughby Gordon, the Quartermaster-General along with a portrait of the Duke of York produced in 1823, although the project was long-delayed. Wilkie intended it to show Wellington writing the dispatch announcing the victory at Waterloo in his battlefield headquarters, making it a loose companion to one of his best-known works The Chelsea Pensioners Reading the Waterloo Dispatch from 1822. However, Gordon pointed out that this was historically inaccurate as the Waterloo dispatch was written in Brussels.

Instead when it was displayed at the Royal Academy Exhibition of 1836 at Somerset House in London it was under the title The Duke of Welliington Writing to the King of France on the Eve of Waterloo. In fact this was itself inaccurate as Wellington had in fact written not to Louis, but to the king's nephew Charles Ferdinand, Duke of Berry at three o'clock in the morning. Today the painting is in the collection of the Aberdeen Art Gallery having been acquired in 1938.

== Bibliography ==
- Tromans, Nicholas. David Wilkie: The People's Painter. Edinburgh University Press, 2007.
- Wellesley, Charles. Wellington Portrayed. Unicorn Press, 2014.
- Wright, Christopher, Gordon, Catherine May & Smith, Mary Peskett. British and Irish Paintings in Public Collections: An Index of British and Irish Oil Paintings by Artists Born Before 1870 in Public and Institutional Collections in the United Kingdom and Ireland. Yale University Press, 2006.
