= An Interview Between Charles I and Oliver Cromwell =

Painting by Daniel Maclise

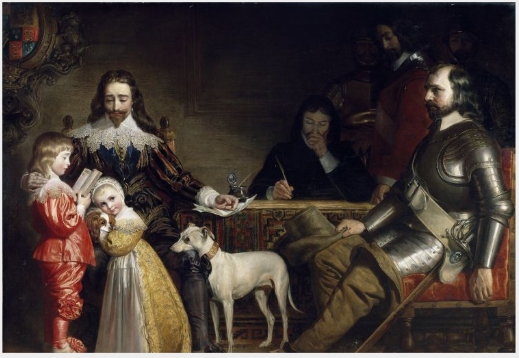
- Artist: Daniel Maclise
- Year: 1836
- Type: Oil on canvas, history painting
- Dimensions: 184 cm × 235 cm (72 in × 93 in)
- Location: National Gallery of Ireland, Dublin

An Interview Between Charles I and Oliver Cromwell is an 1836 history painting by the Irish artist Daniel Maclise. It depicts a meeting between Charles I in and the Roundhead commander Oliver Cromwell, in which the king with two of his children with him, signs over power to Cromwell.

Charles was later executed in 1649 with Oliver Cromwell one of those who signed his death warrant. The work was displayed at the Royal Academy Exhibition of 1836 at Somerset House in London. The painting is now in the collection of the National Gallery of Ireland in Dublin, having been purchased in 1951.

== Bibliography ==
- Murray, Peter. Daniel Maclise, 1806-1870: Romancing the Past. University of Michigan, 2008.
- Weston, Nancy. Daniel Maclise: Irish Artist in Victorian London. Four Courts Press, 2001.
