= Cenotaph to the Memory of Sir Joshua Reynolds =

Painting by John Constable

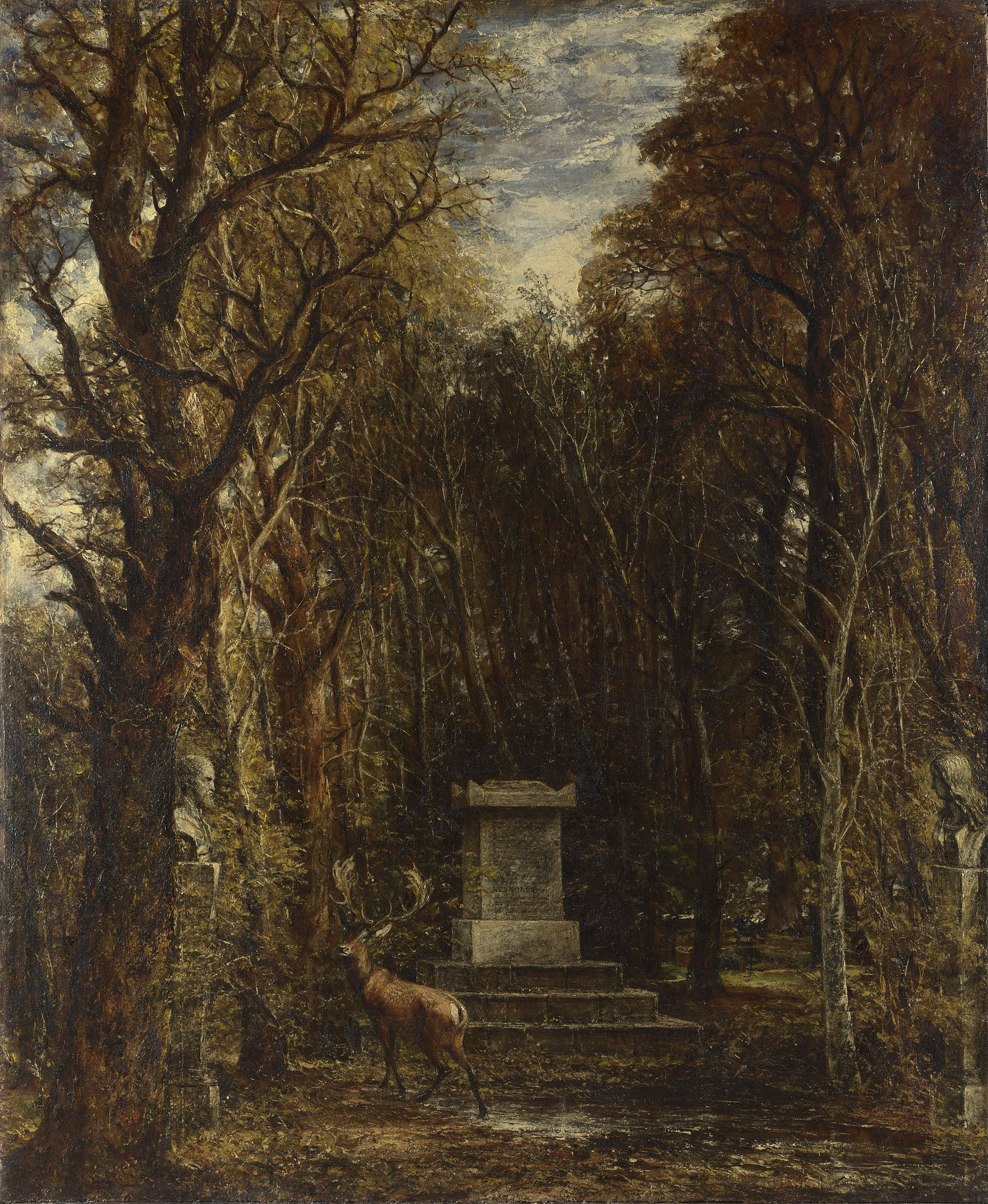
- Artist: John Constable
- Year: 1836
- Type: Oil on canvas, Landscape painting
- Dimensions: 132 cm × 108.5 cm (52 in × 42.7 in)
- Location: National Gallery, London

Cenotaph to the Memory of Sir Joshua Reynolds is an 1836 landscape painting by the English artist John Constable. One of his later works, it depicts a scene in the grounds of the country estate Coleorton Hall in Leicestershire. Formerly the property of the landowner and artistic patron Sir George Beaumont before his death in 1827, it features a monument commemorating the life of Sir Joshua Reynolds, the first President of the Royal Academy. The monument was erected in 1812. The artist visited the property in 1823, when he did pencil sketches before developing it into a grander work more than a decade later. Constable shows it amongst the woodland of the estate, with a stag prominently featured. It was exhibited at the Royal Academy's Summer Exhibition at Somerset House the same year. Since 1888 it has been in the collection of the National Gallery having been part of the Constable Bequest.

== See also ==
- List of paintings by John Constable

== Bibliography ==
- Charles, Victoria. Constable. Parkstone International, 2015.
- Coleman, Patrick, Lewis, Jayne & Kowalik, Jill. Representations of the Self from the Renaissance to Romanticism. Cambridge University Press, 2000.
- Hamilton, James. Constable: A Portrait. Hachette UK, 2022.
- Murray, Christopher John. Encyclopedia of the Romantic Era, 1760–1850. Routledge, 2013.
- Venning, Barry. Constable. Parkstone International, 2015.
