= Napoleon and Pius VII at Fontainebleau =

Painting by David Wilkie

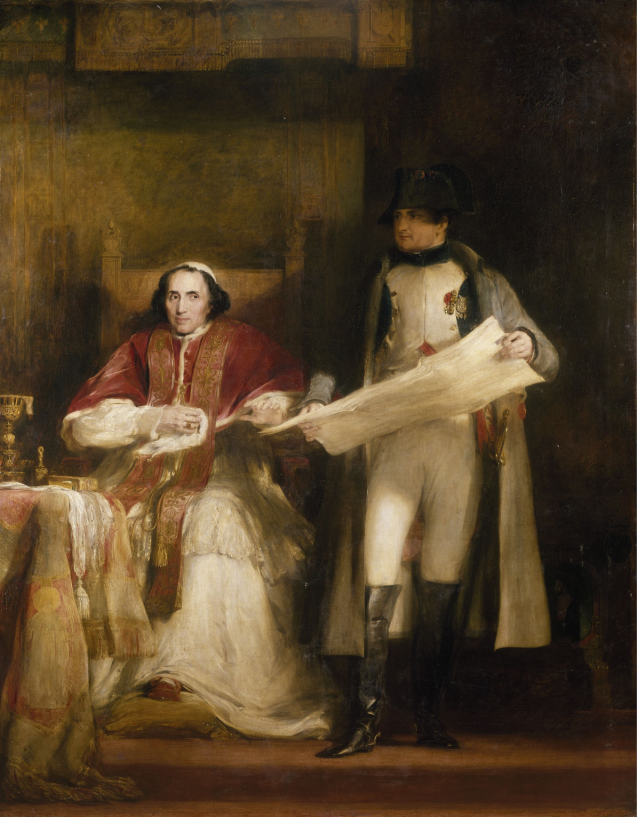
- Artist: David Wilkie
- Year: 1836
- Type: Oil on canvas, history painting
- Dimensions: 255 cm × 196 cm (100 in × 77 in)
- Location: National Gallery of Ireland, Dublin

Napoleon and Pius VII at Fontainebleau is an 1836 history painting by the Scottish artist David Wilkie. It is held at the National Gallery of Ireland, in Dublin.

== History ==
It depicts Napoleon, the emperor of France, meeting with Pope Pius VII at Fontainebleau Palace. Wilkie was inspired by a passage in Walter Scott's 1827 biography The Life of Napoleon Buonaparte.

Wilkie read Scott's book while in Geneva. He originally conceived the painting as showing the two arguing over the French emperor's desire to divorce his wife Joséphine in order to allow him to make a dynastic marriage with Marie Louise, the daughter of Emperor Francis I of Austria. When Pius refused to grant a divorce, Napoleon imprisoned him in France. As this confrontation had not involved a face-to-face meeting, Wilkie instead chose to portray the two men meeting in 1813 to negotiate the Concordat of Fontainebleau. He wanted his painting to show the contrasting world views of Napoleon and Pius, particularly the latter's moral dilemma in dealing with the perceived evil of the domineering French emperor.

It was exhibited at the Royal Academy's 1836 Summer Exhibition at Somerset House. It is now in the collection of the National Gallery of Ireland in Dublin, having been acquired in 1877. The painting cost £2,000 to purchase, representing a major acquisition for the Dublin gallery.

== Bibliography ==
- Olson, Roberta. Ottocento: Romanticism and Revolution in 19th-century Italian Painting. Centro Di, 1992.
- Somerville-Large, Peter. 1854-2004: The Story of the National Gallery of Ireland. National Gallery of Ireland, 2004.
- Tromans, Nicholas. David Wilkie: The People's Painter. Edinburgh University Press, 2007.
