= Salon of 1836 =

1836 art exhibition in Paris

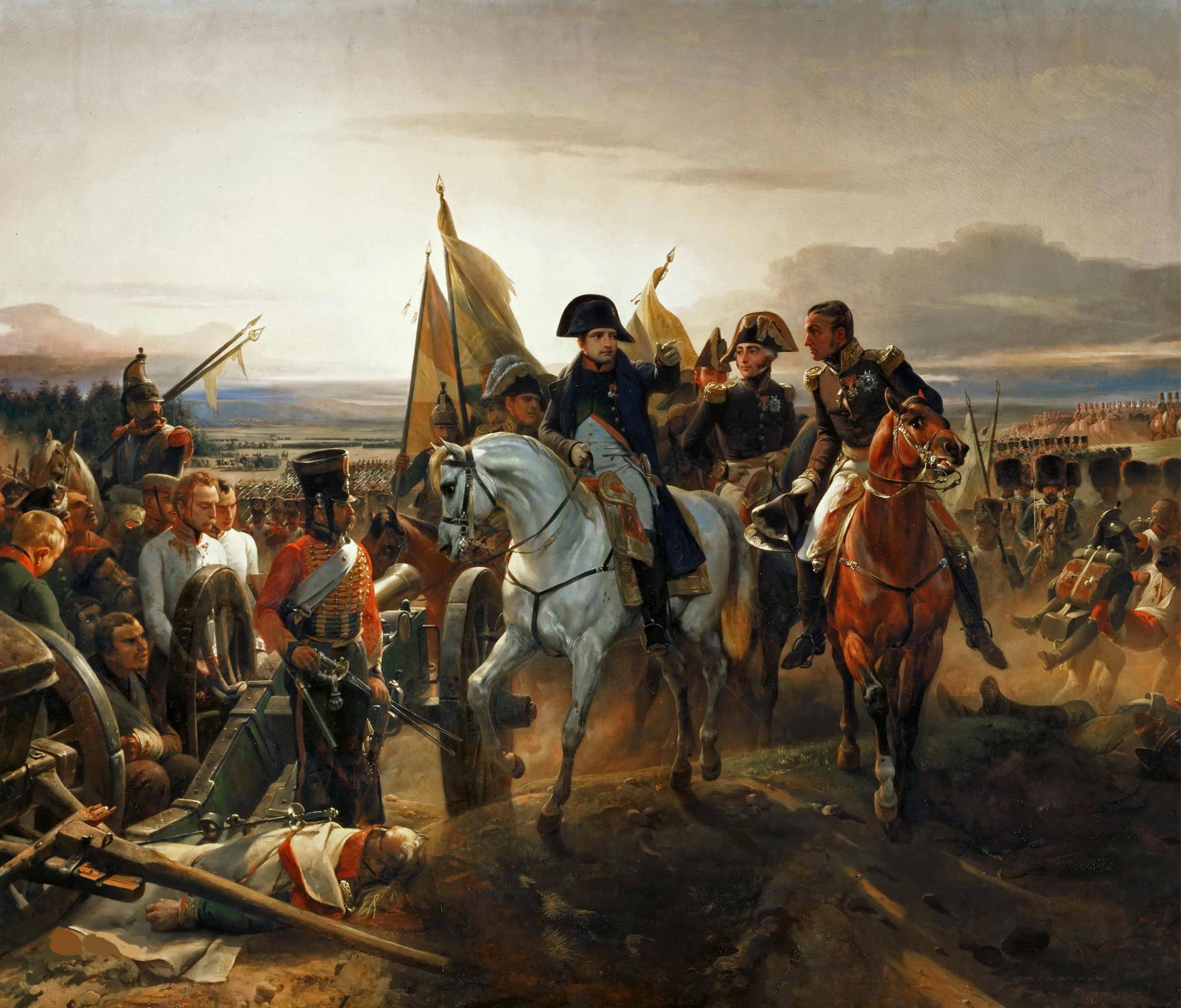
The Battle of Friedland by Horace Vernet. One of three Napoleonic battle scenes exhibited by Vernet.

The Salon of 1836 was an art exhibition held at the Louvre in Paris. Since 1833 the Salon had been held annually, featuring paintings, sculptures and other works of art. It was followed by the Salon of 1837.

It took place during the July Monarchy and featured works depicting the July Revolution of 1830 The Arrival of the Duke of Orleans at the Hôtel de Ville by Charles-Philippe Larivière and The King Distributing Battalion Standards to the National Guard. Louis Philippe I had ordered the restoration of the historic Palace of Versailles as a Musée de l'Histoire de France. This meant commissioning of a number of battle scenes depicting patriotic moments from French history. Notably, Horace Vernet exhibited three paintings (The Battle of Friedland, The Battle of Jena and The Battle of Wagram) showing scenes from the Napoleonic Wars intended to hang in the Galerie des Batailles. Vernet also submitted his The Battle of Fontenoy set during the War of the Austrian Succession. In addition works by other artists destined for Versailles were also displayed, including The Battle of Hohenlinden by Henri Frédéric Schopin, The Battle of Marignan by Alexandre-Évariste Fragonard and The Battle of Lauffeld by Auguste Couder. Joseph Beaume's Napoleon's Departure from Elba was intended to be displayed by was withdrawn due to the sensitives arising from Louis Napoleon's failed Strasbourg Coup attempt.

Camille Roqueplan displayed The Lion in Love, now in the Wallace Collection Léon Cogniet's The National Guard of Paris Departs for the Army portrayed a scene from 1792 during the first French Revolution. Eugène Delacroix exhibited The Martyrdom of Saint Sebastian but a painting featuring Hamlet was rejected by the committee. The German artist Franz Xaver Winterhalter made his Salon debut with Il Dolce far niente. The young artist Théodore Chassériau received third-place medal in the category of history painting. A young British artist Thomas Jones Barker also appeared for the first time. When one of Théodore Rousseau's paintings was rejected by the jury, he refused to enter the salon again until the Salon of 1849.

In portraiture Auguste de Châtillon submitted a portrait of the writer Victor Hugo seated with his son. The admiral Henri de Rigny, co-victor at the Battle of Navarino, was depicted by François-Gabriel Lépaulle. Pierre Daubigny produced a miniature featuring the writer Alfred de Vigny. The engraver Jean-Pierre-Marie Jazet exhibited six prints including versions of works by Vernet.

== Gallery ==
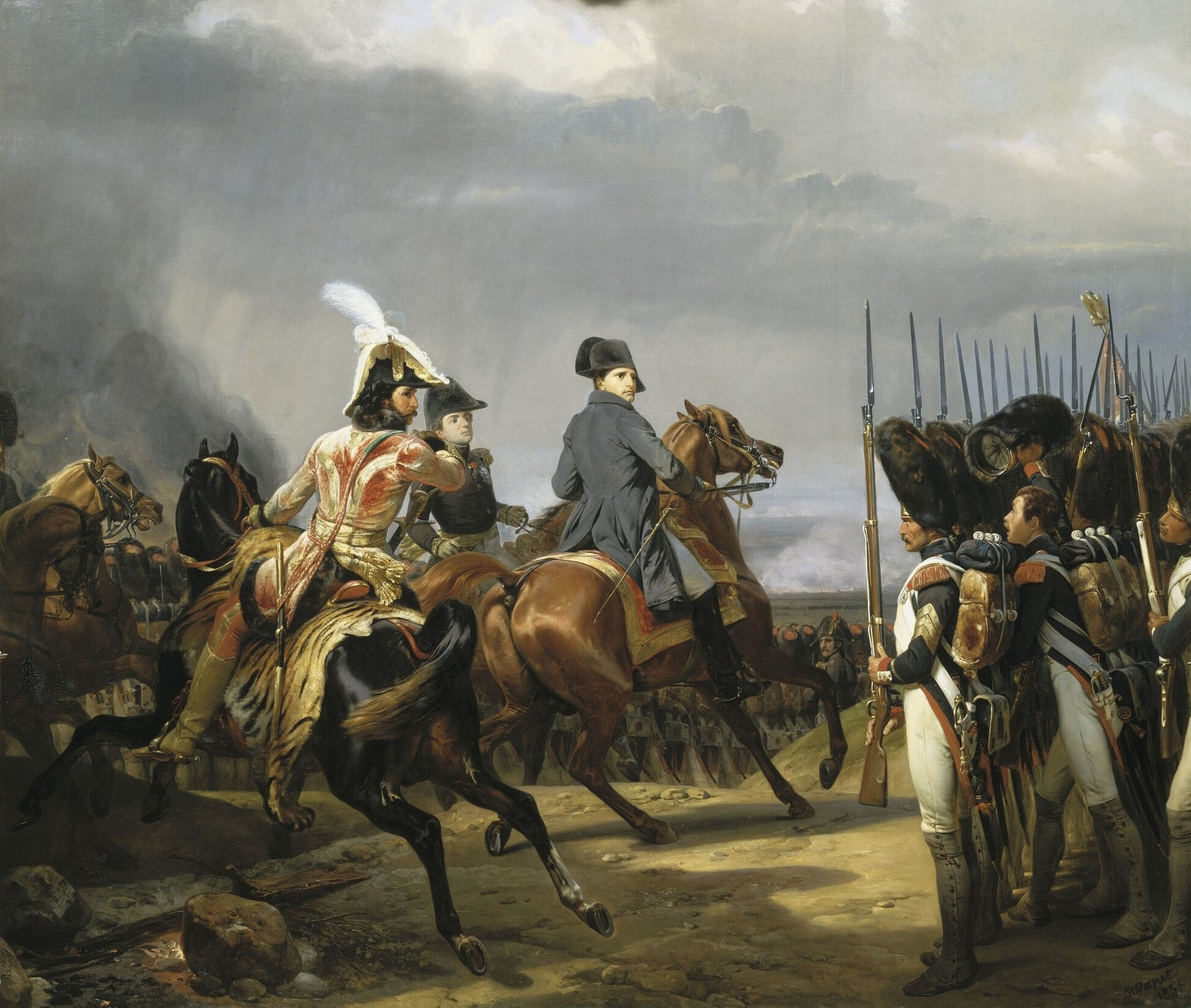
The Battle of Jena by Horace Vernet

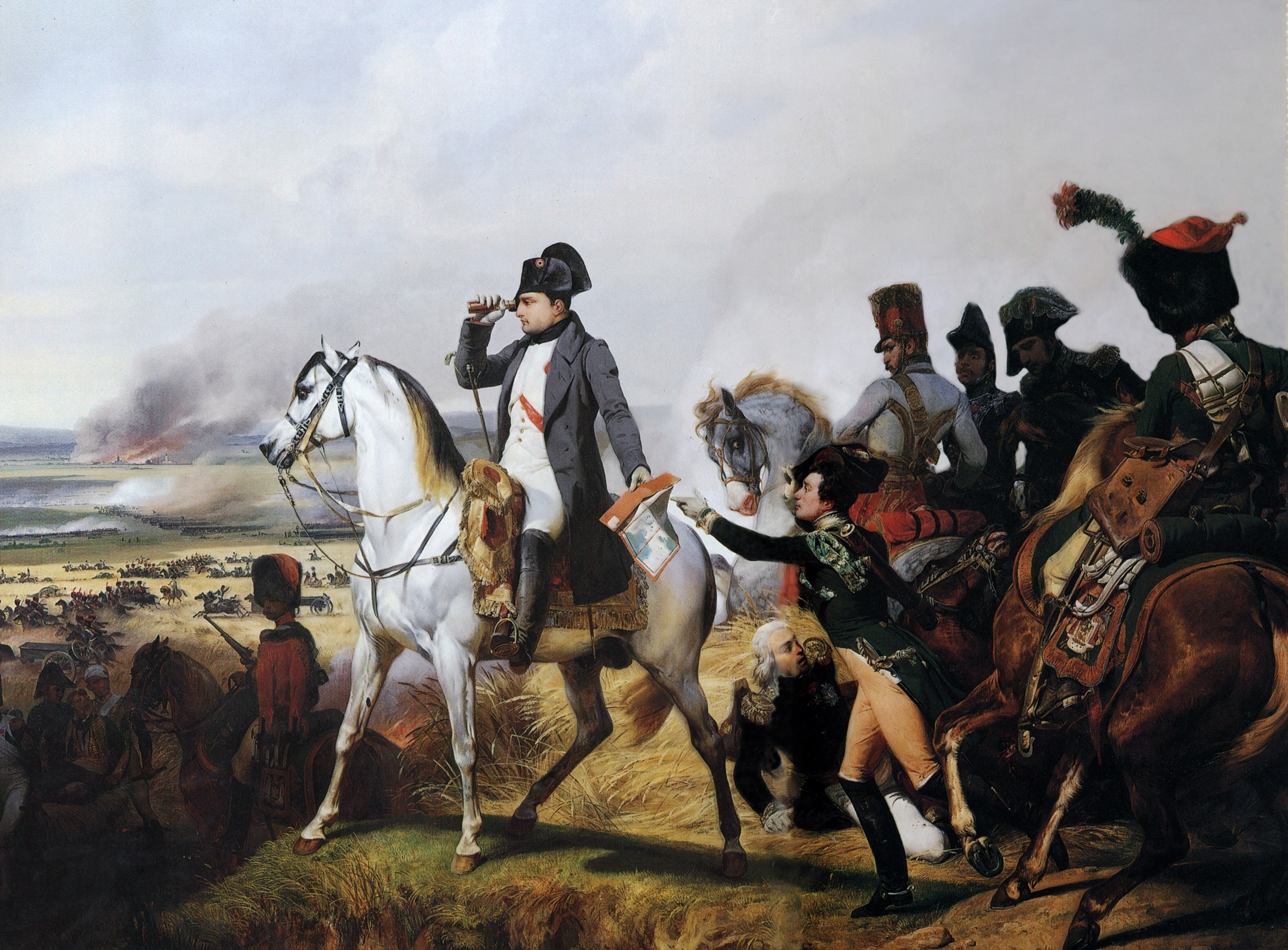
The Battle of Wagram by Horace Vernet

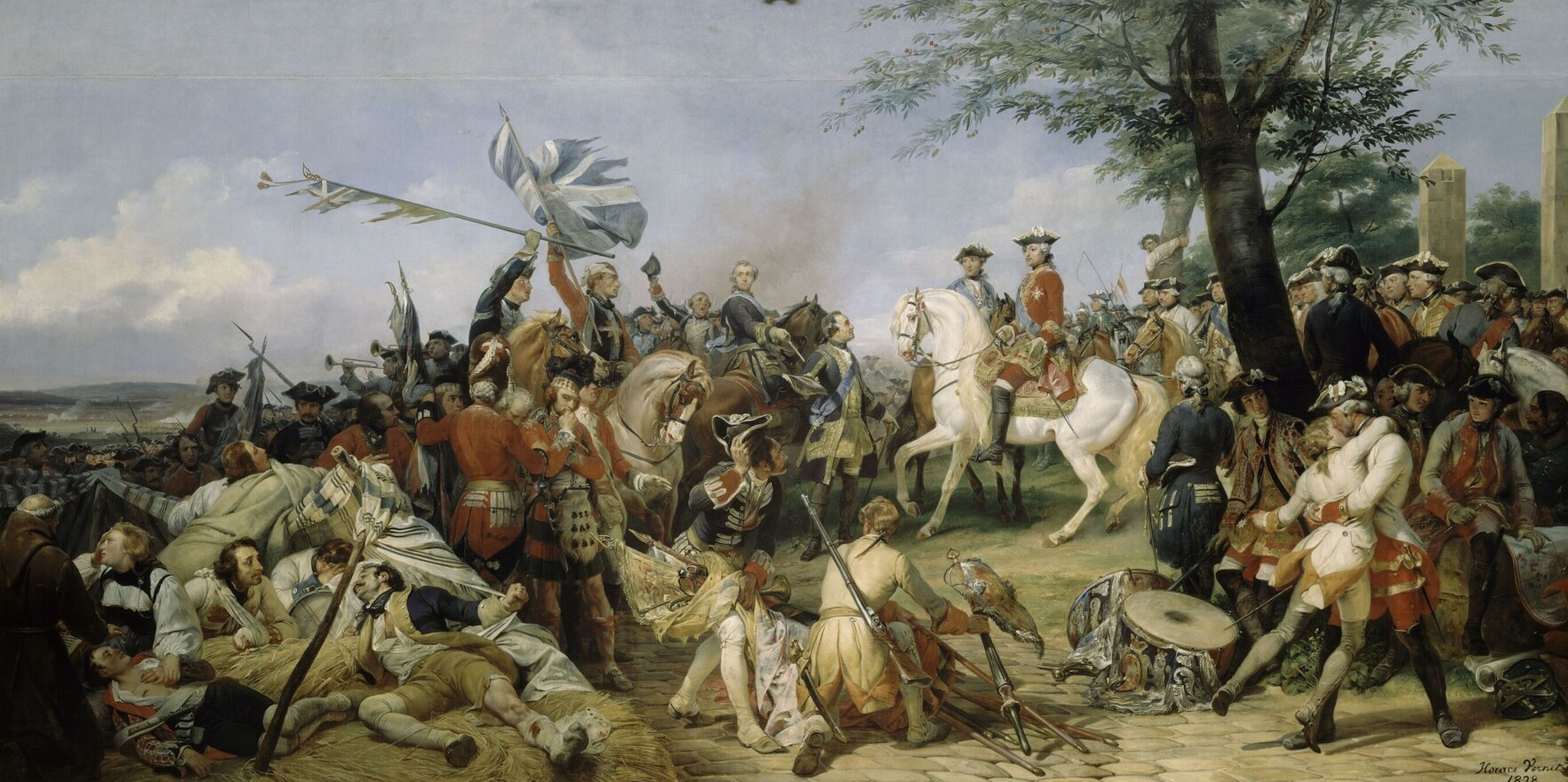
The Battle of Fontenoy by Horace Vernet

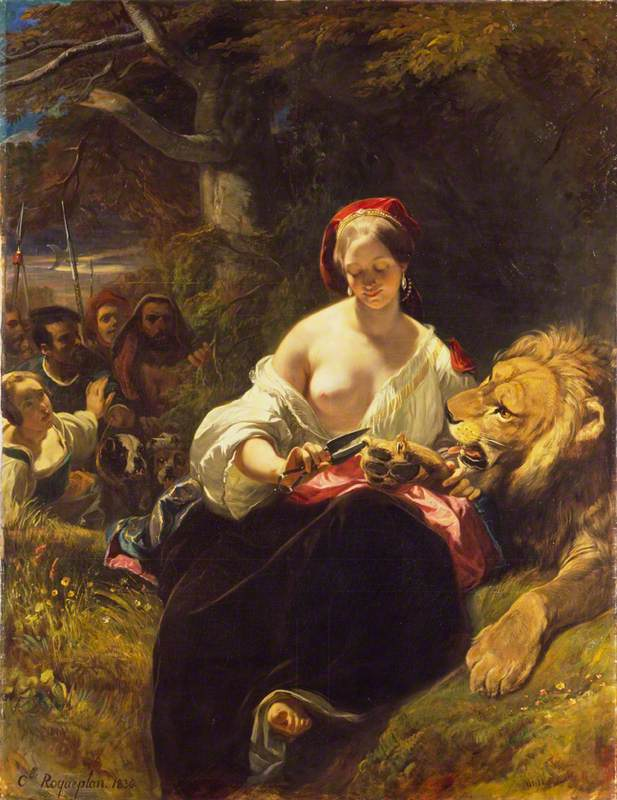
The Lion in Love by Camille Roqueplan

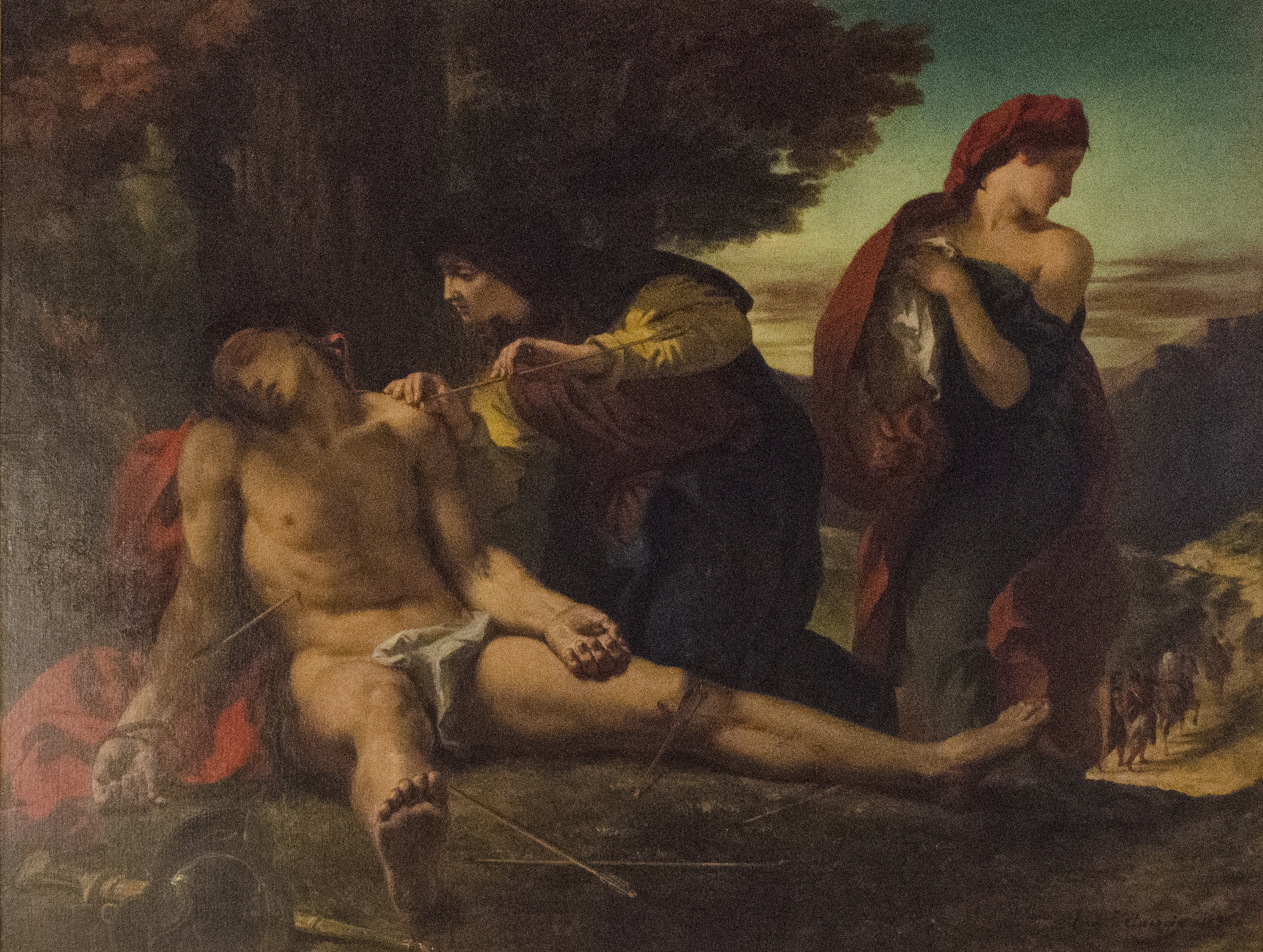
The Martyrdom of Saint Sebastian by Eugène Delacroix

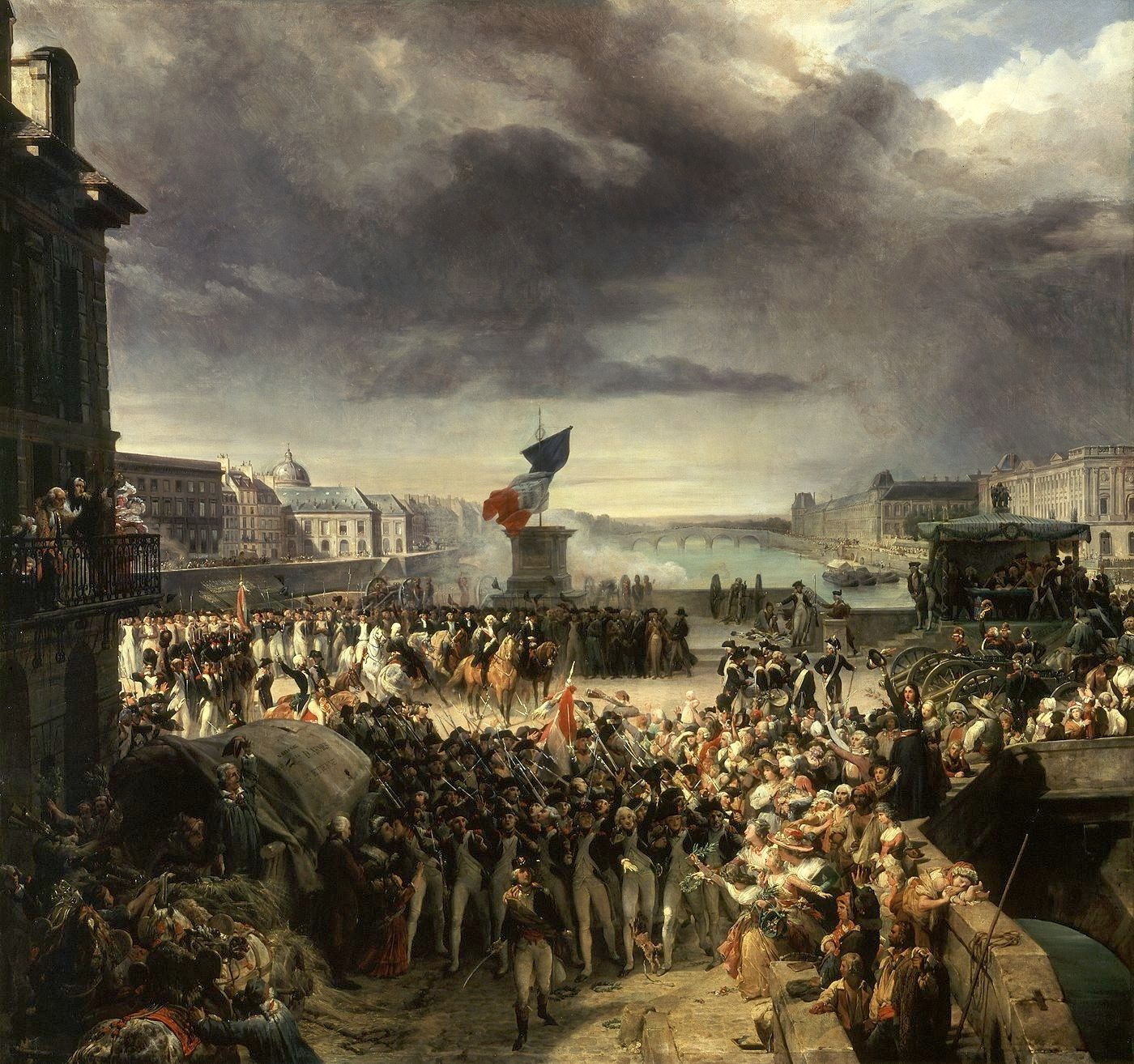
The National Guard of Paris Departs for the Army by Léon Cogniet

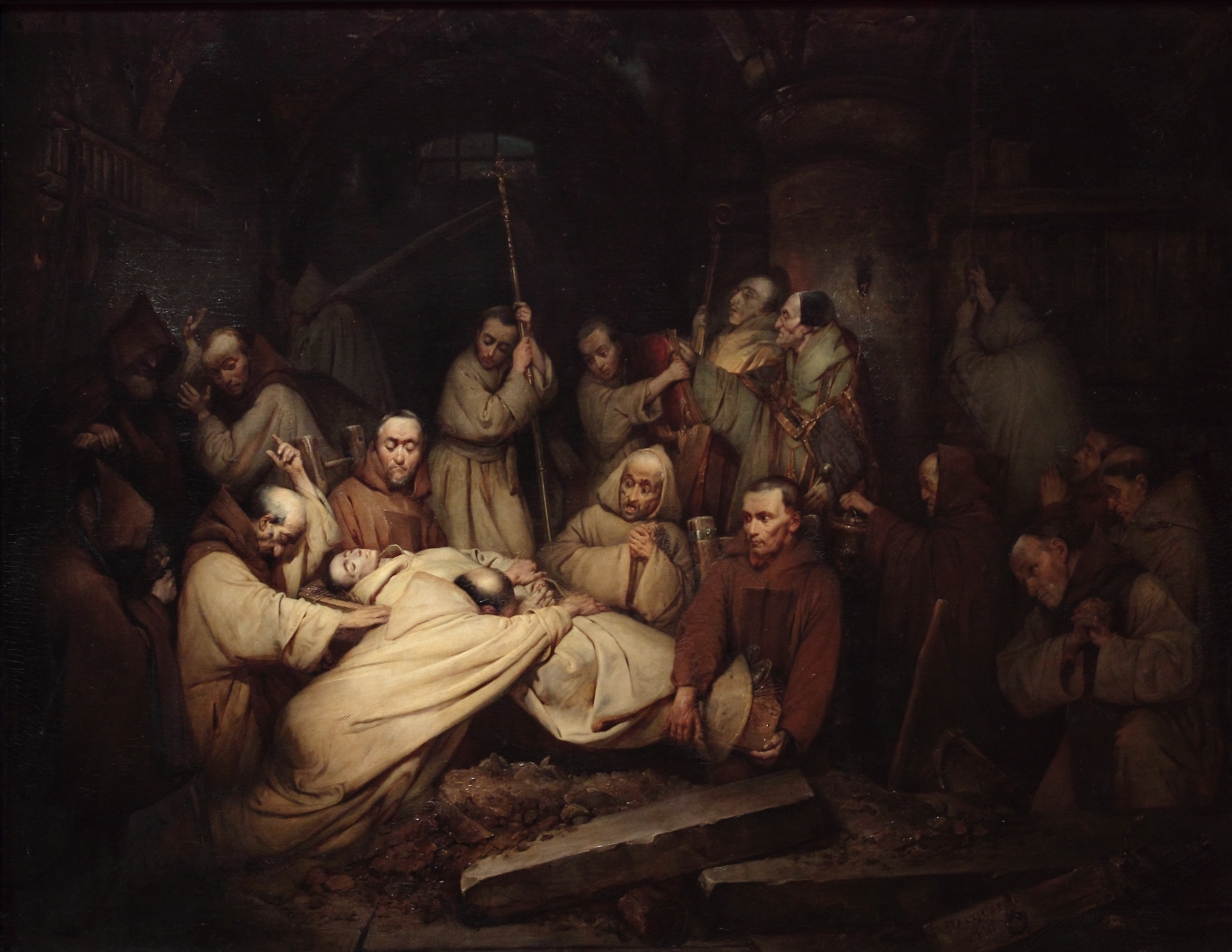
The Count of Comminges Recognising Adélaïde by Claudius Jacquand

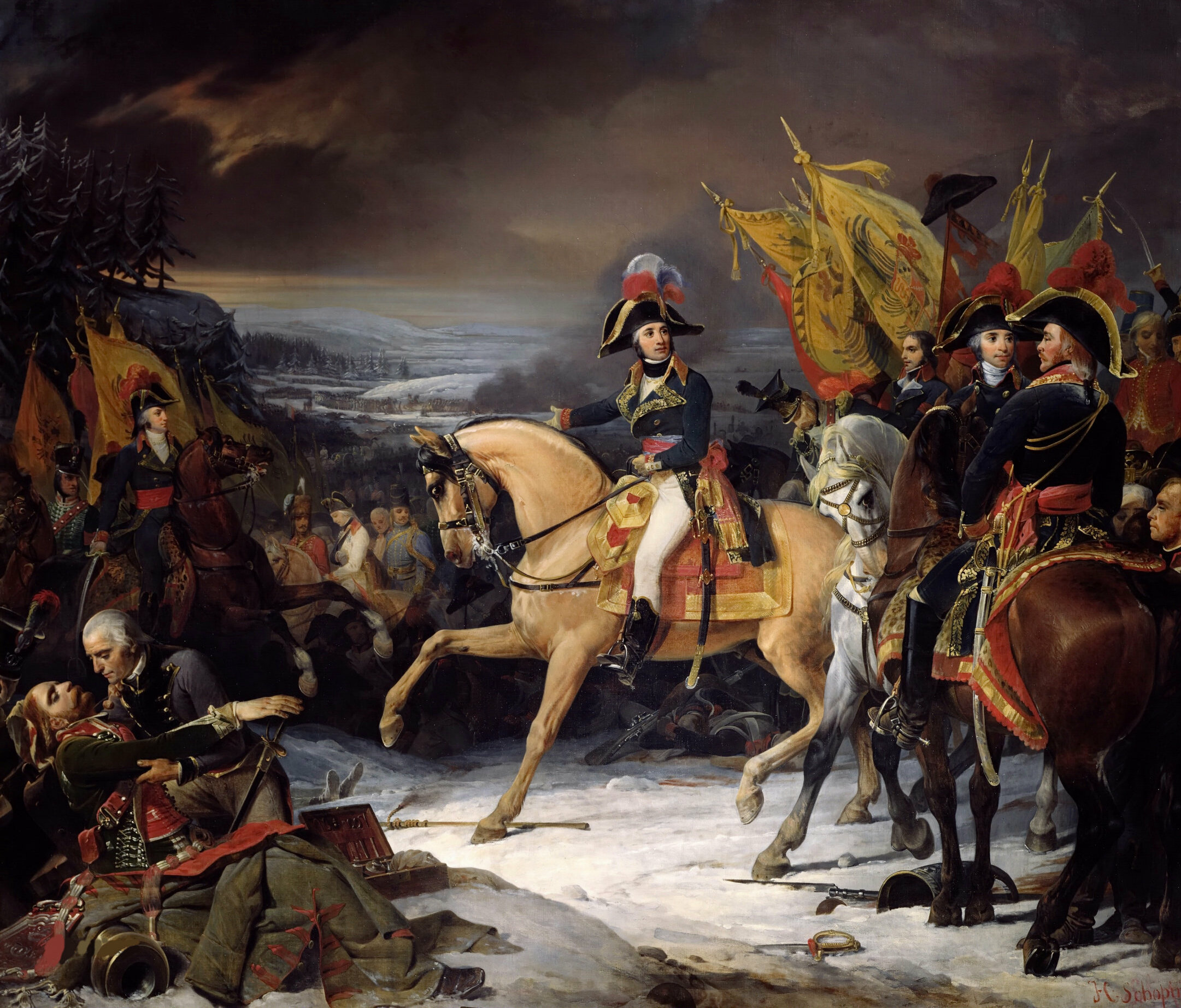
The Battle of Hohenlinden by Henri Frédéric Schopin

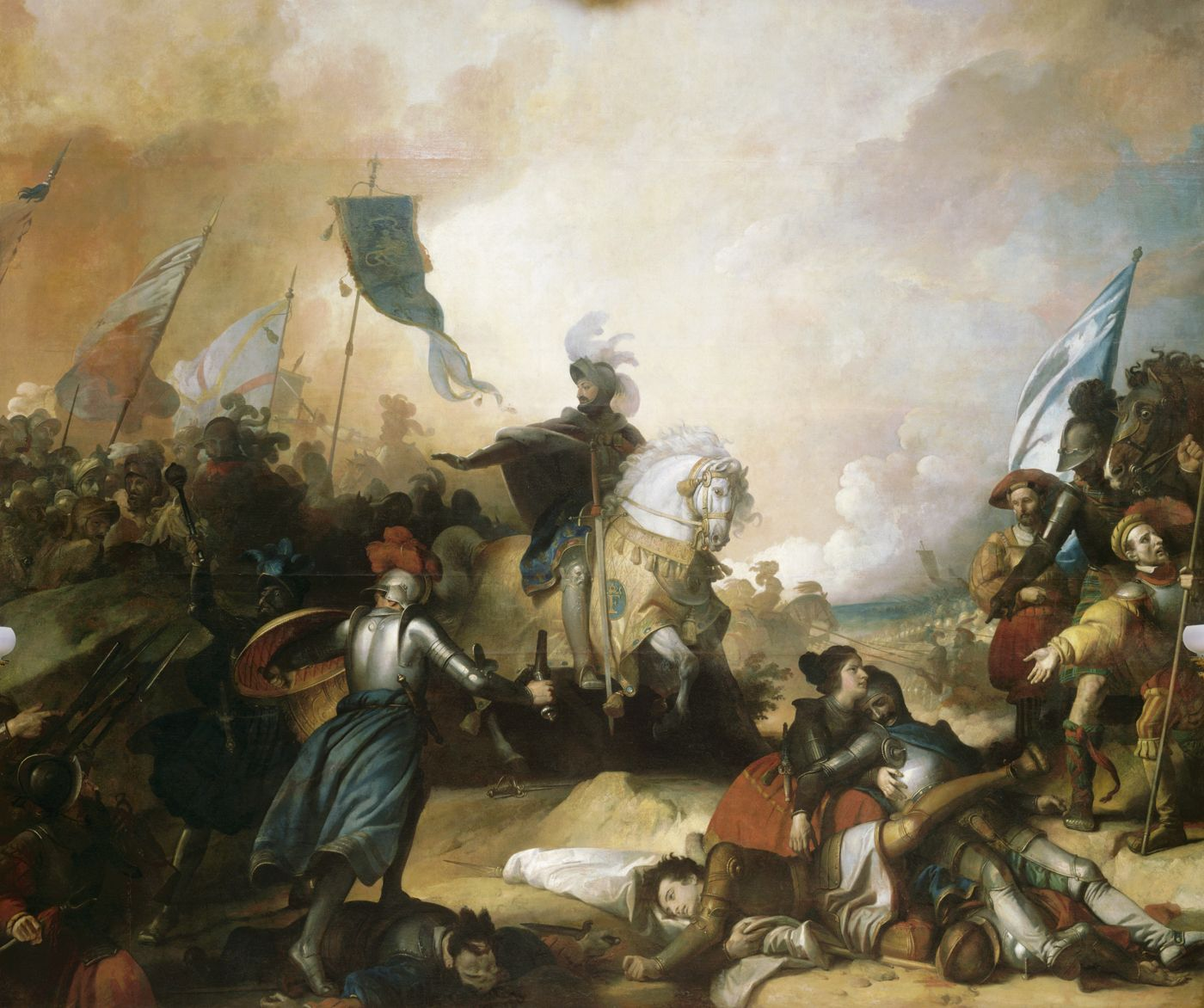
The Battle of Marignan by Alexandre-Évariste Fragonard

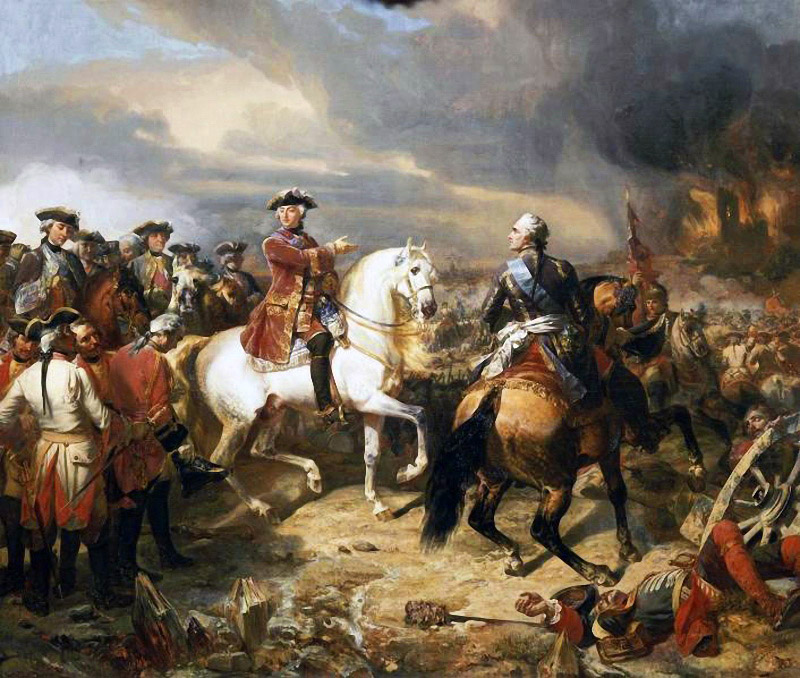
The Battle of Lauffeld by Auguste Couder

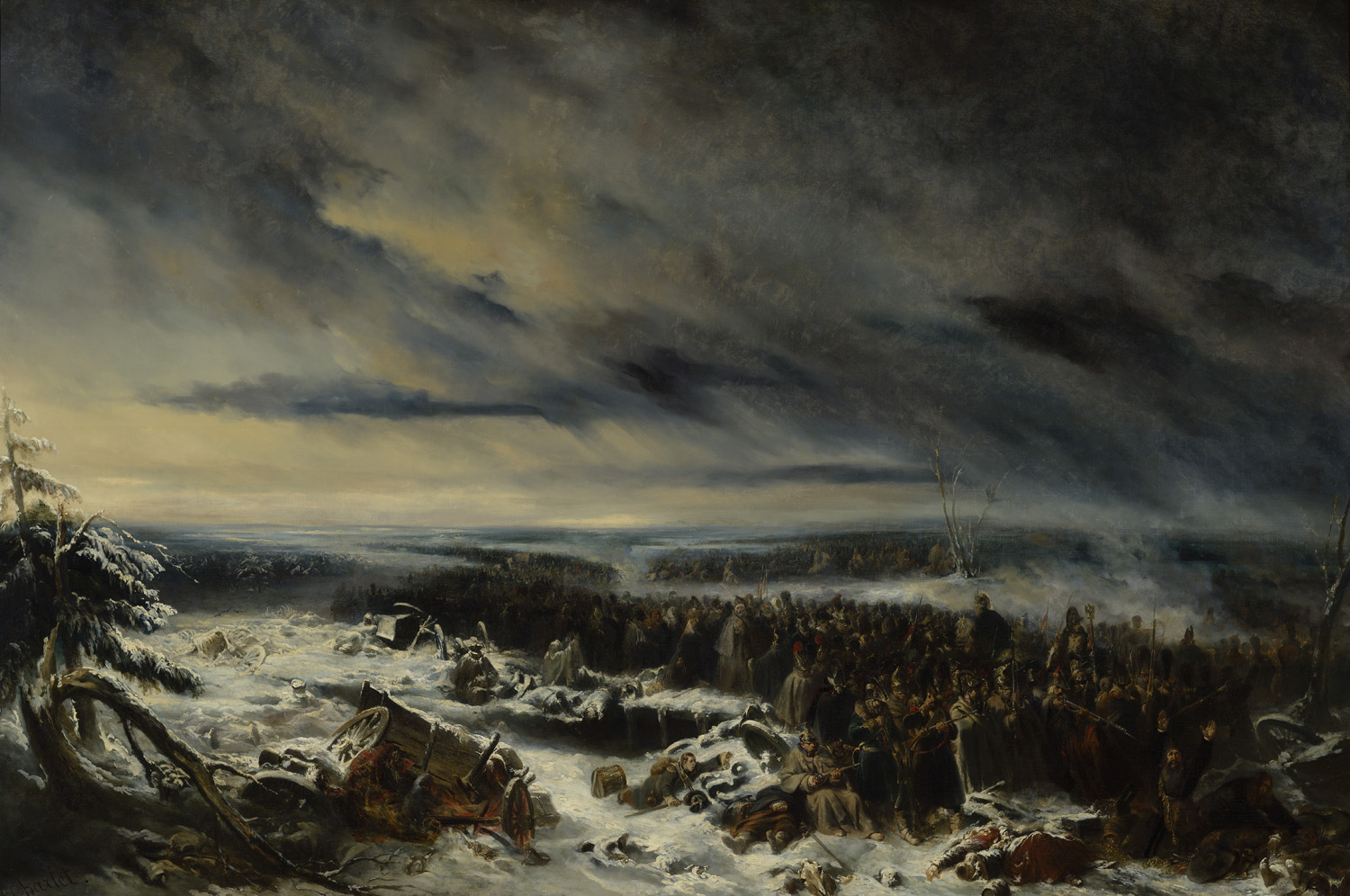
An Episode from the Russian Campaign by Nicolas-Toussaint Charlet

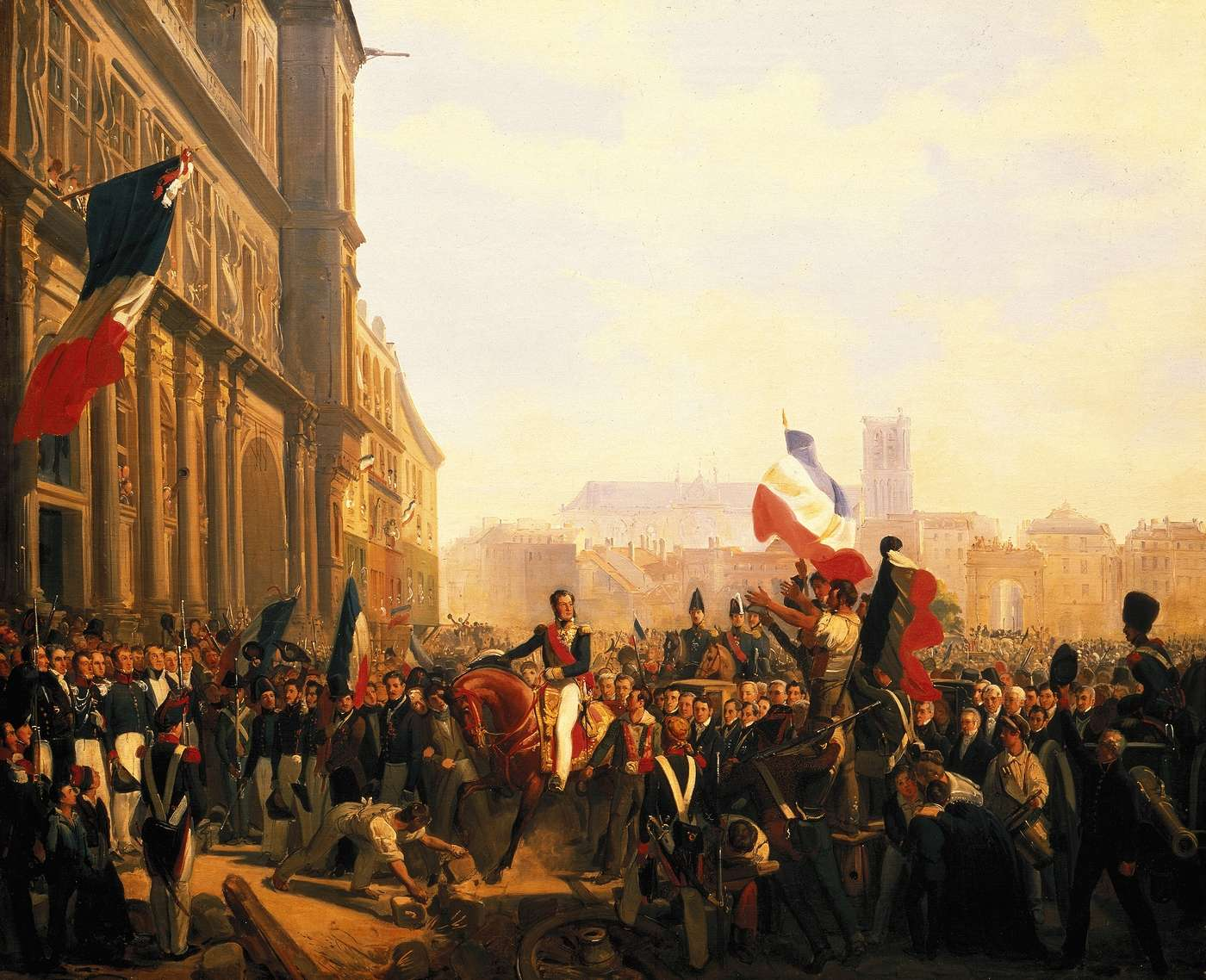
The Arrival of the Duke of Orleans at the Hôtel de Ville by Charles-Philippe Larivière

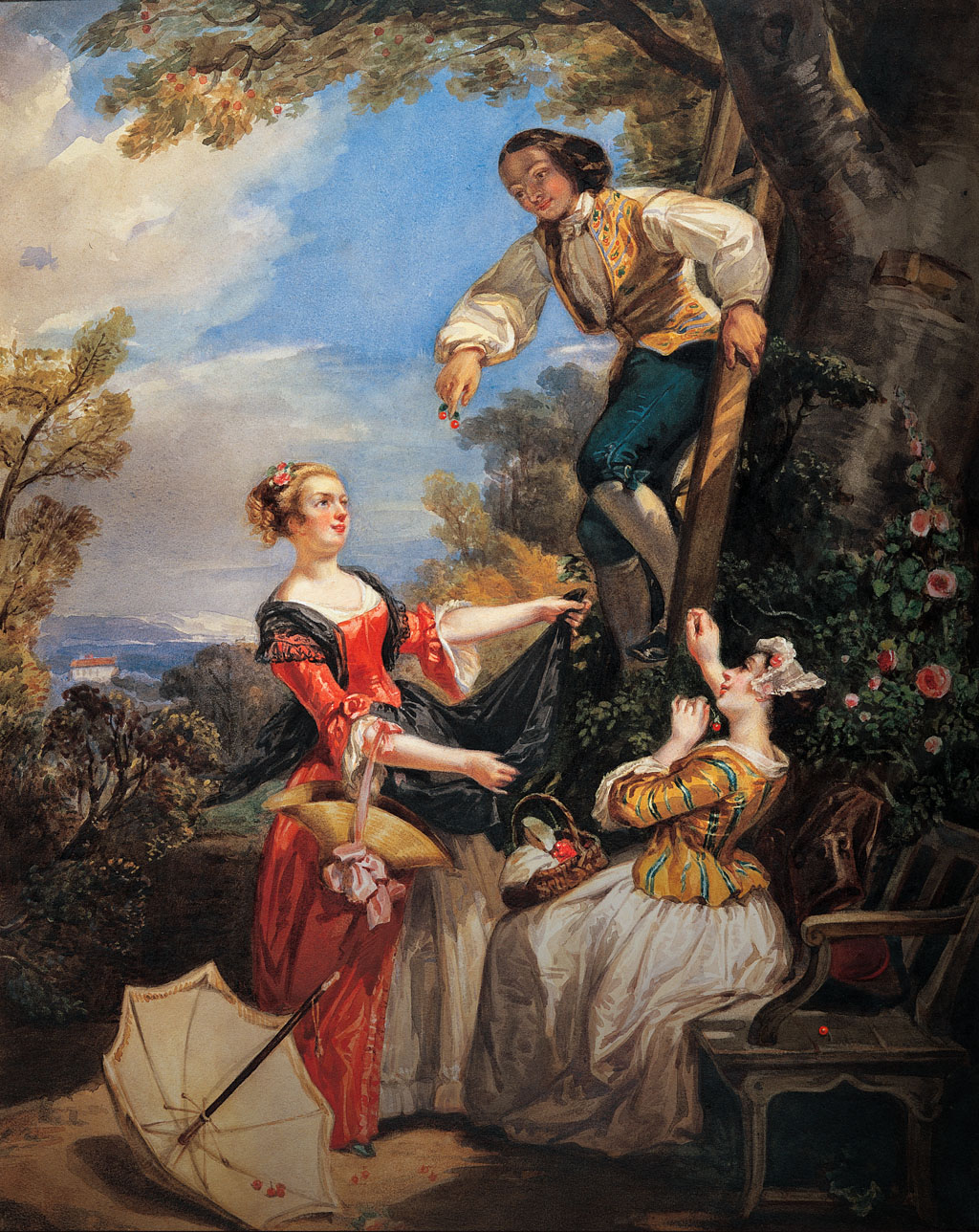
Jean-Jacques Rousseau Picking Cherries by Camille Roqueplan

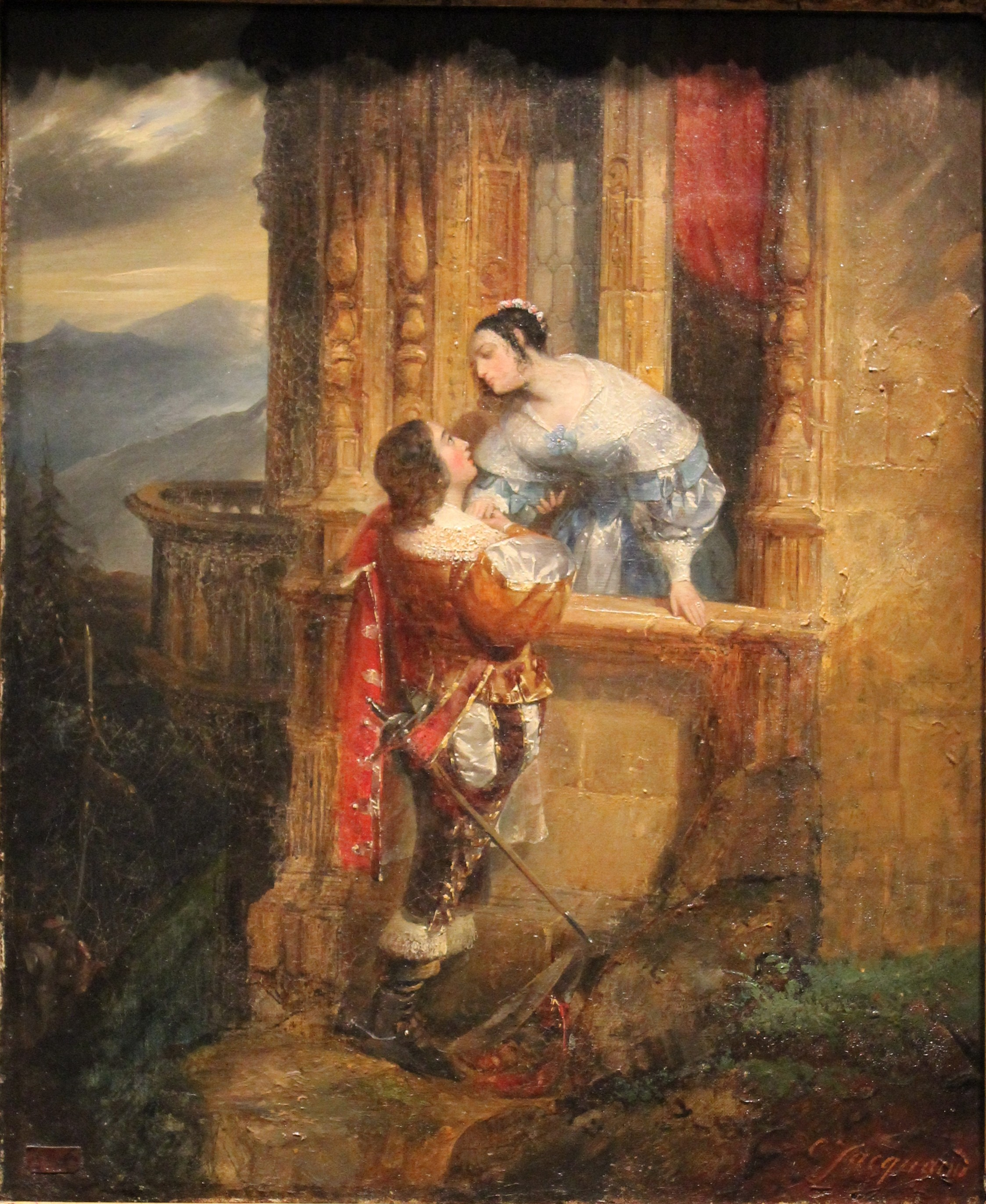
Cinq-Mars' Farewell to Marie d'Entraigues by Claudius Jacquand

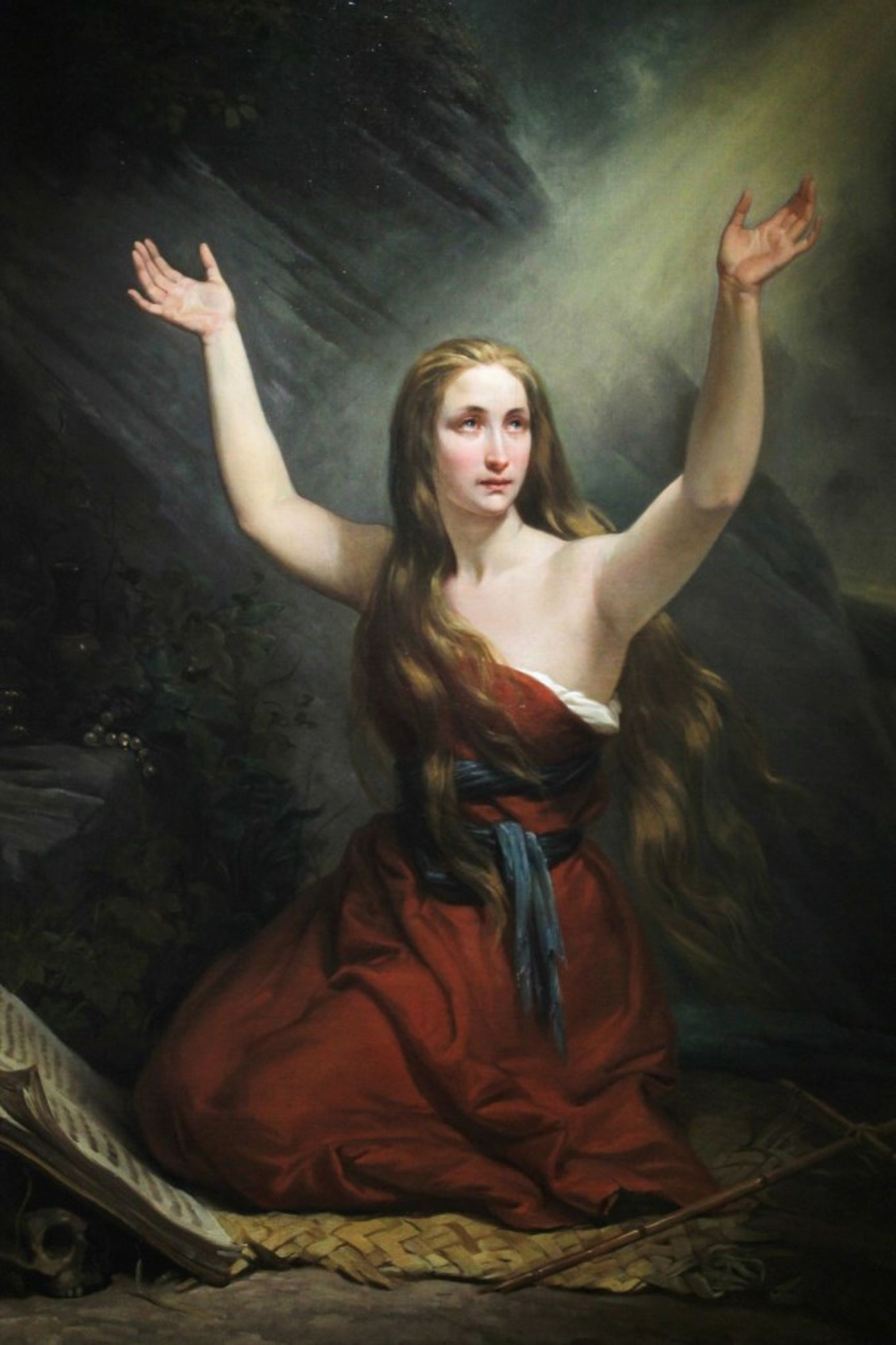
Madeleine au désert by Herminie Déhérain

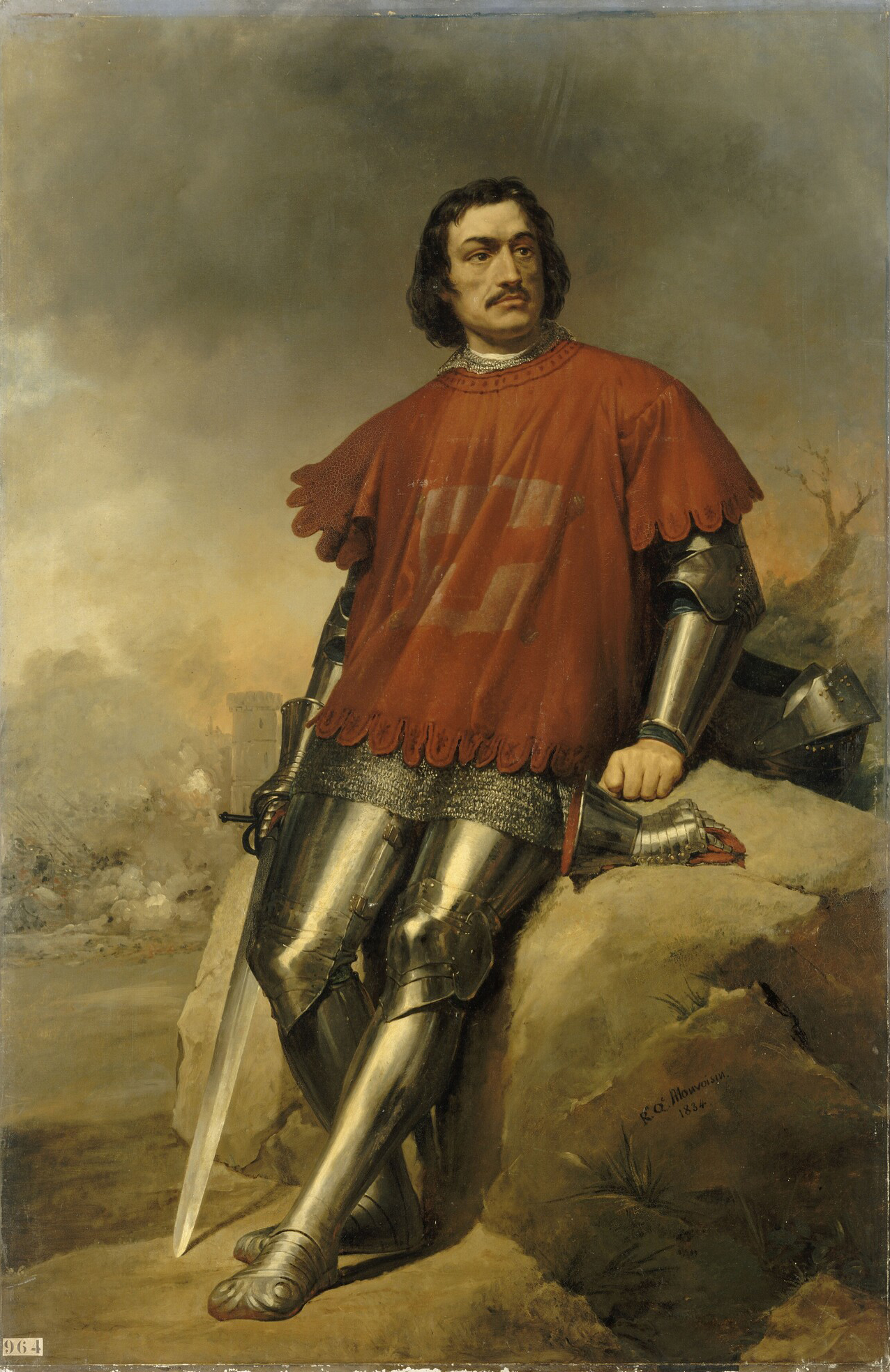
Jean Poton de Xaintrailles by Raymond Monvoisin

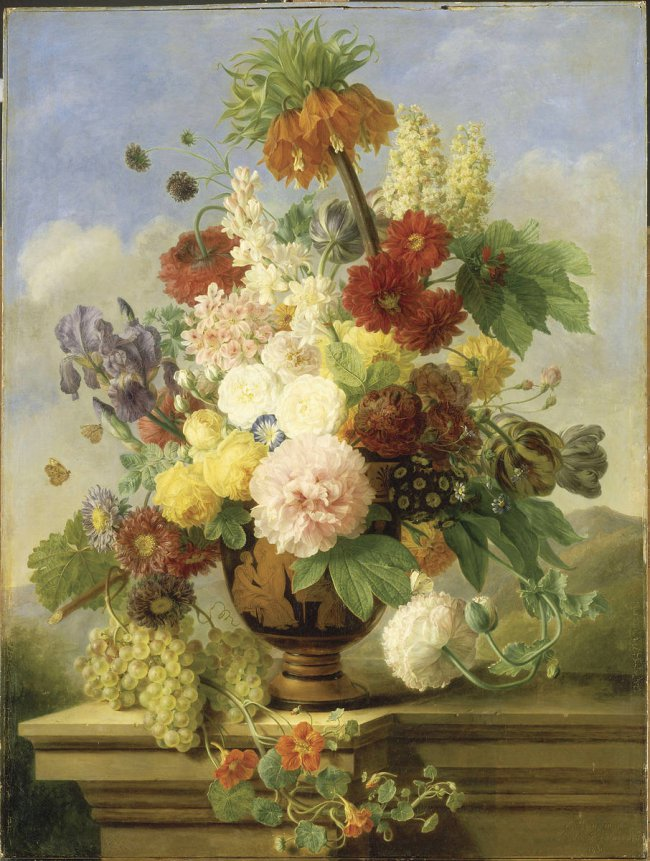
Flowers by Élise Bruyère

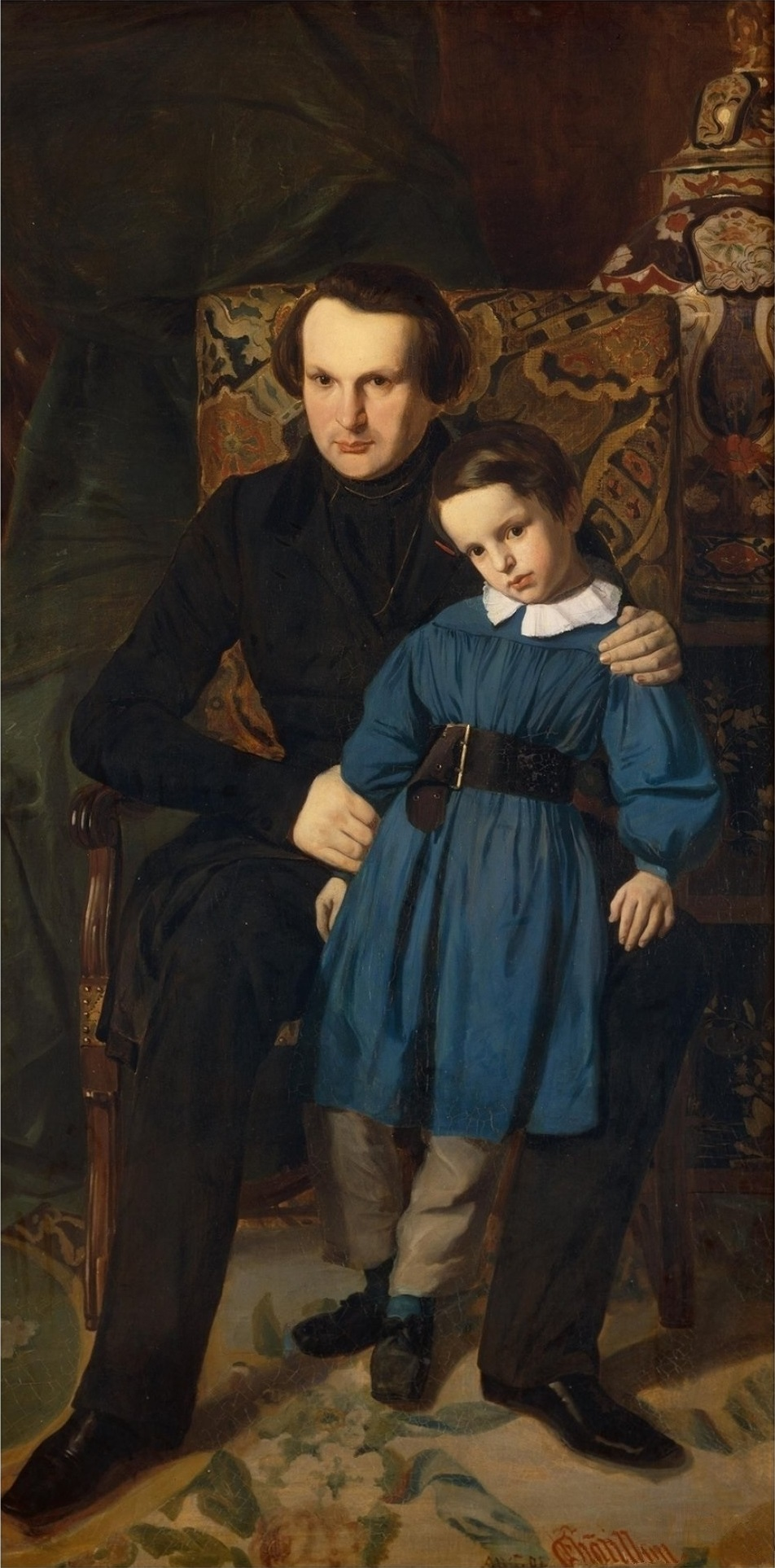
Victor Hugo and His Son by Auguste de Châtillon

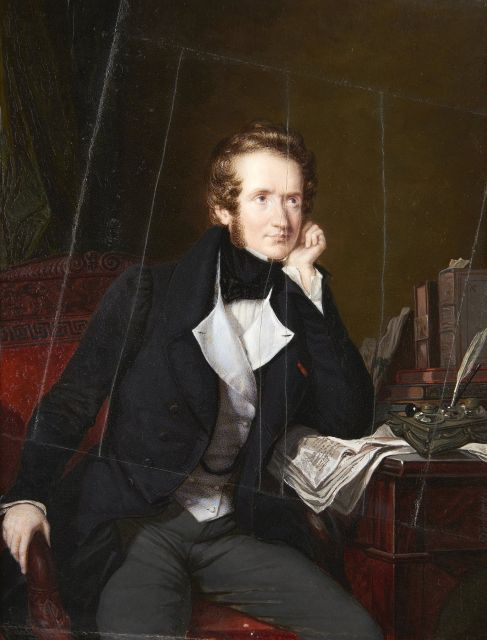
Portrait of Alfred de Vigny by Pierre Daubigny

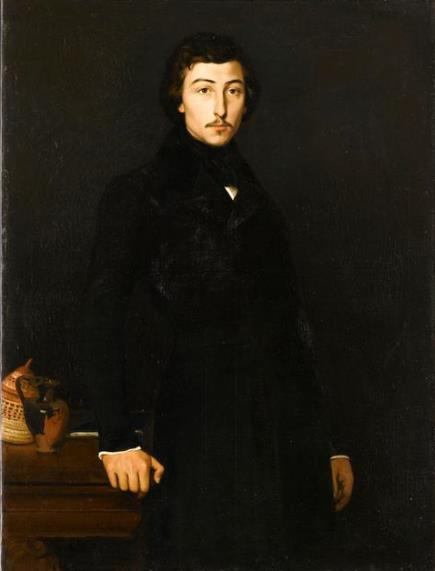
Portrait of Prosper Marilhat by Théodore Chassériau

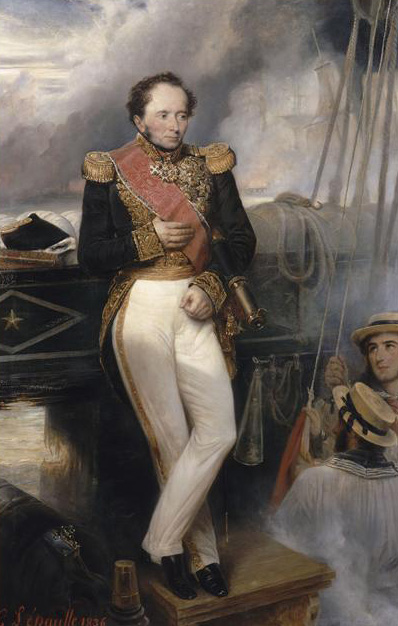
Portrait of Henri de Rigny by François-Gabriel Lépaulle

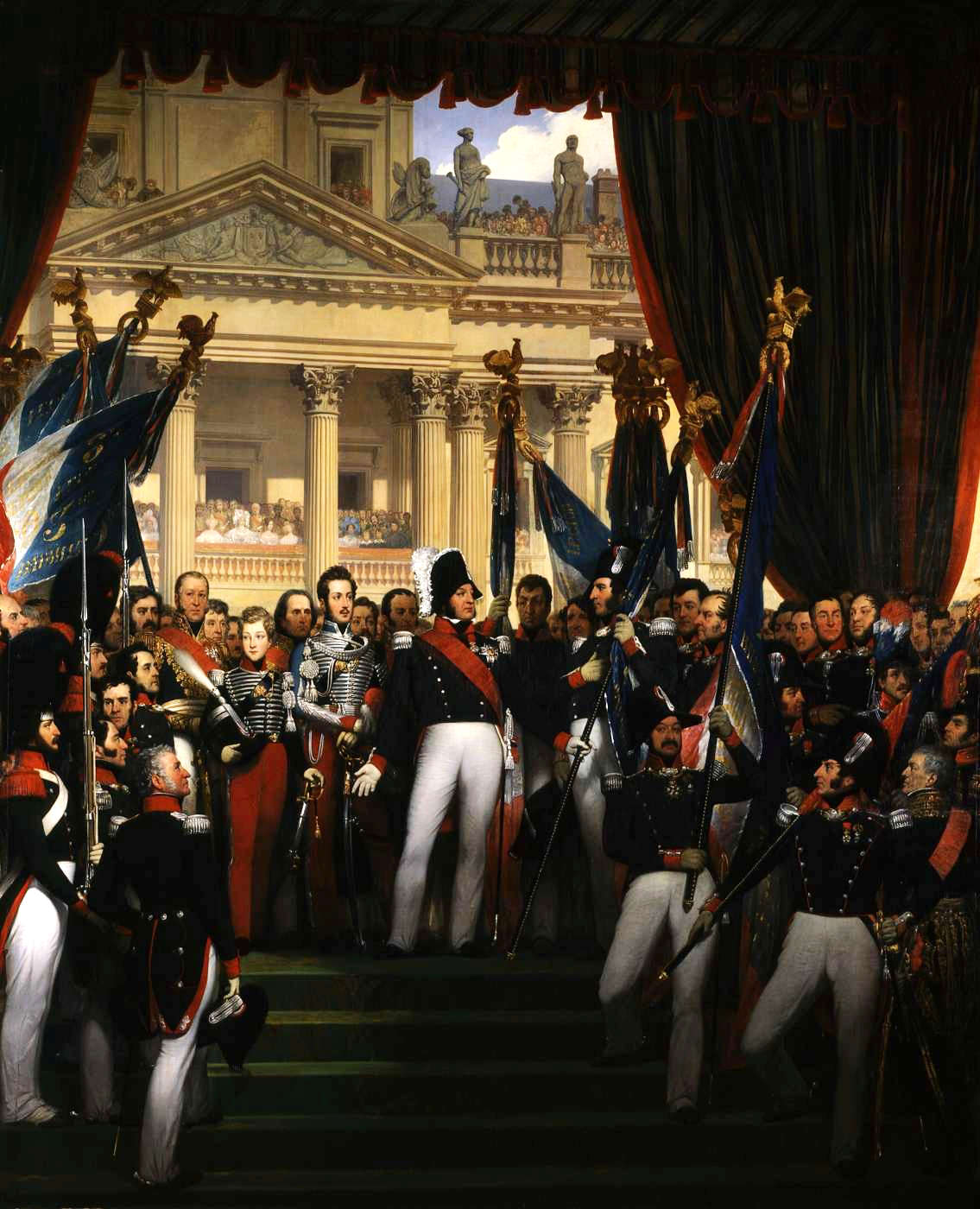
The King Distributing Battalion Standards to the National Guard by Joseph-Désiré Court

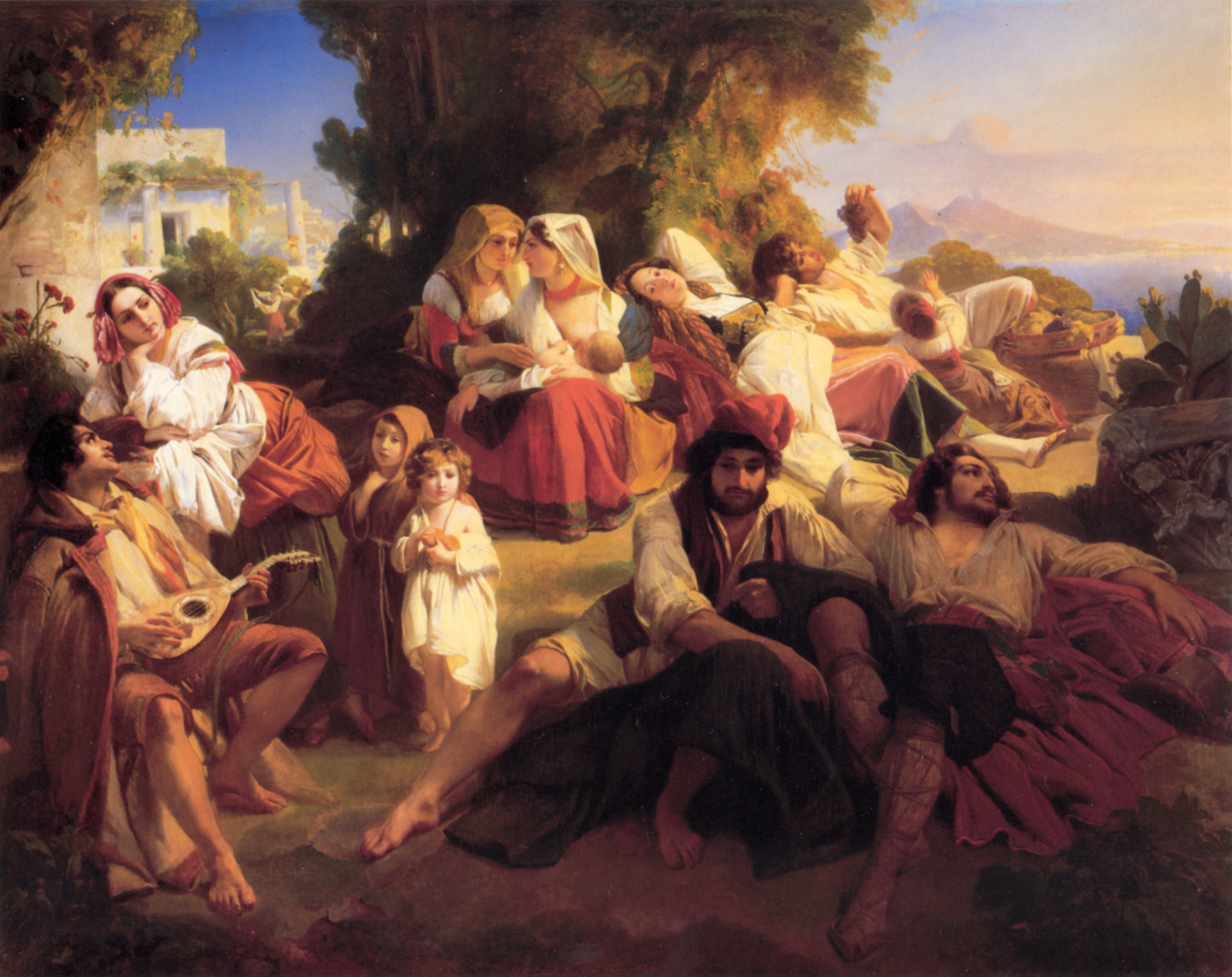
Il Dolce far niente by Franz Xaver Winterhalter

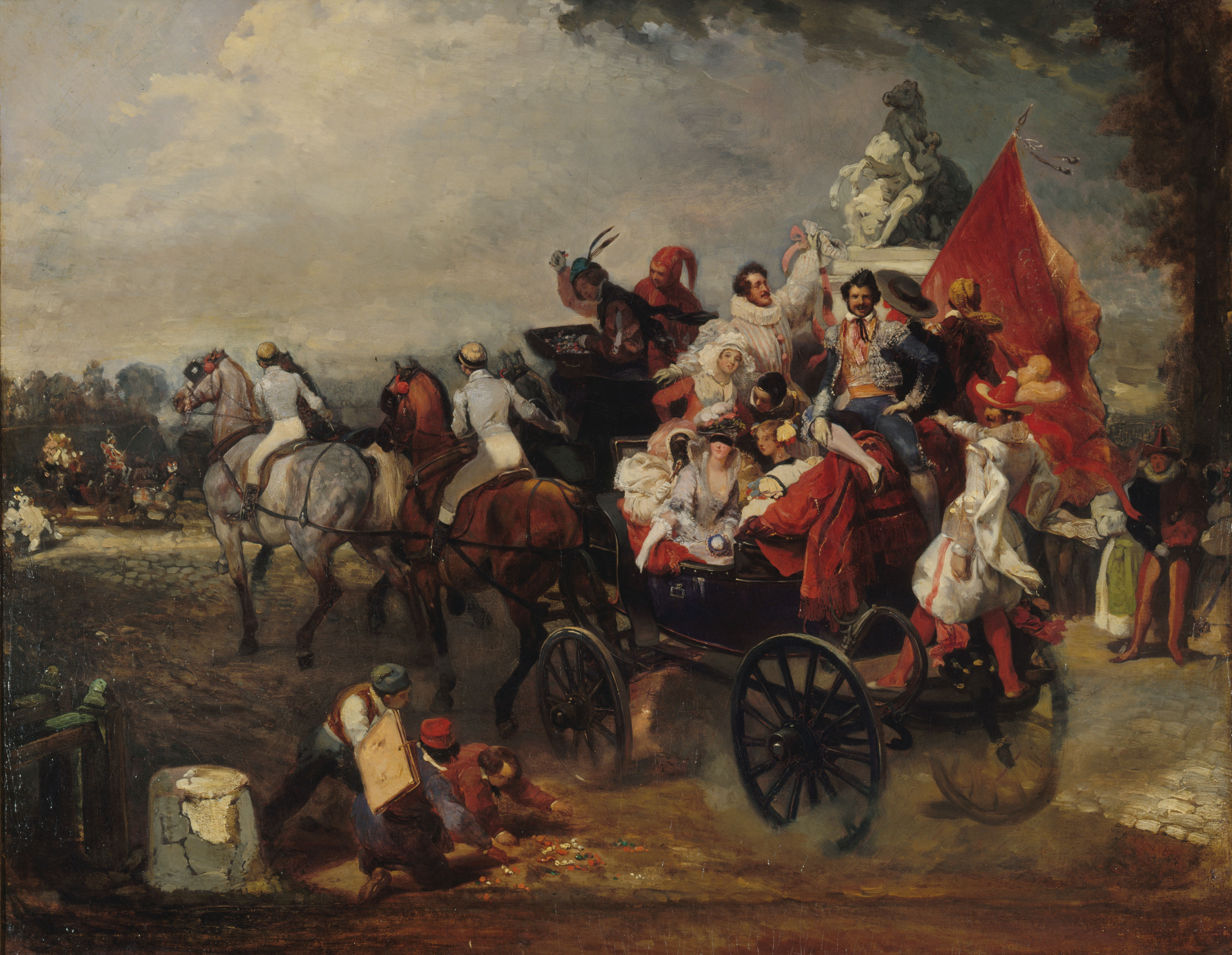
Scène de carnaval, place de la Concorde by Eugène Lami

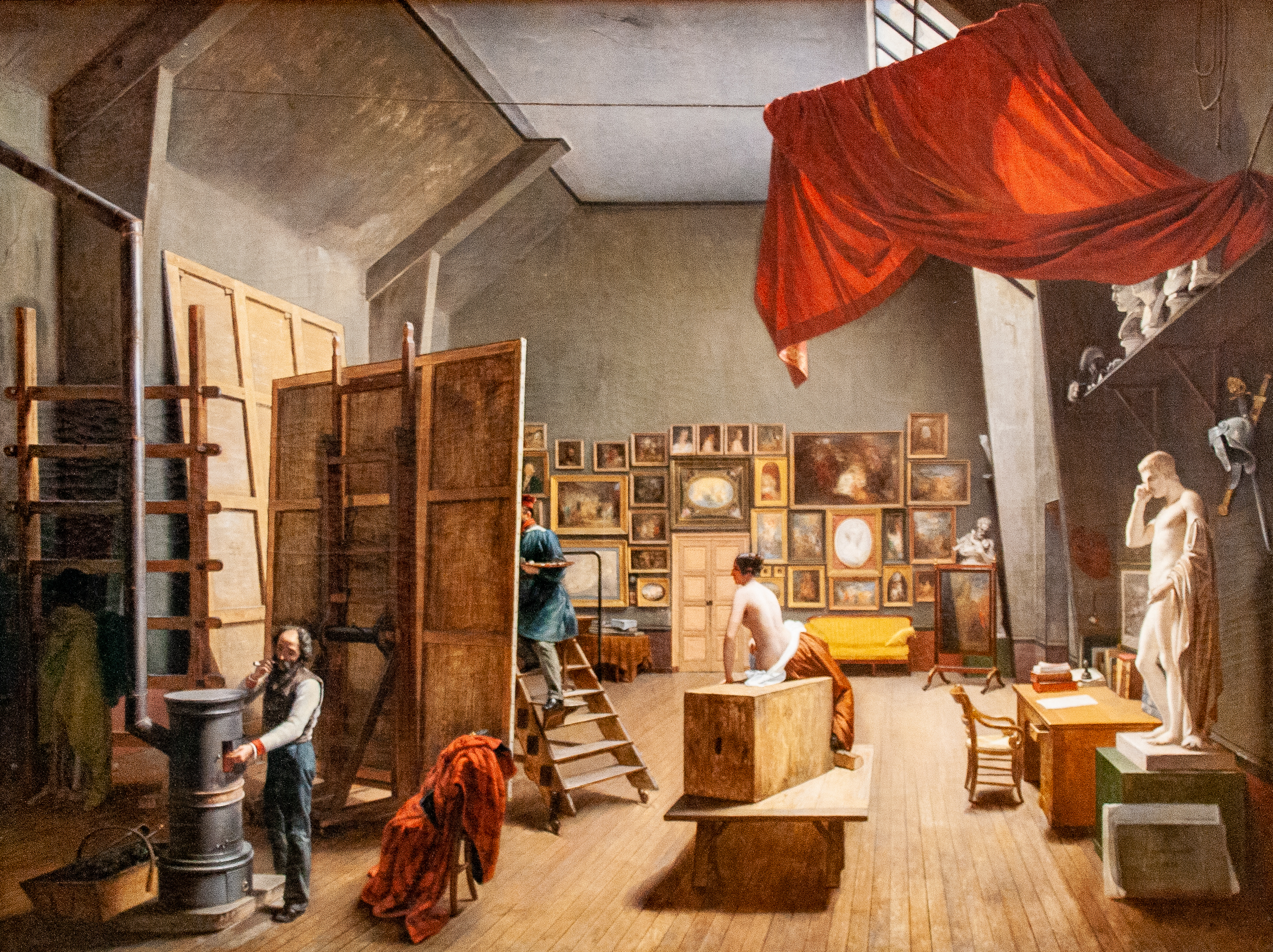
The Studio of Abel de Pujol by Adrienne Marie Louise Grandpierre-Deverzy

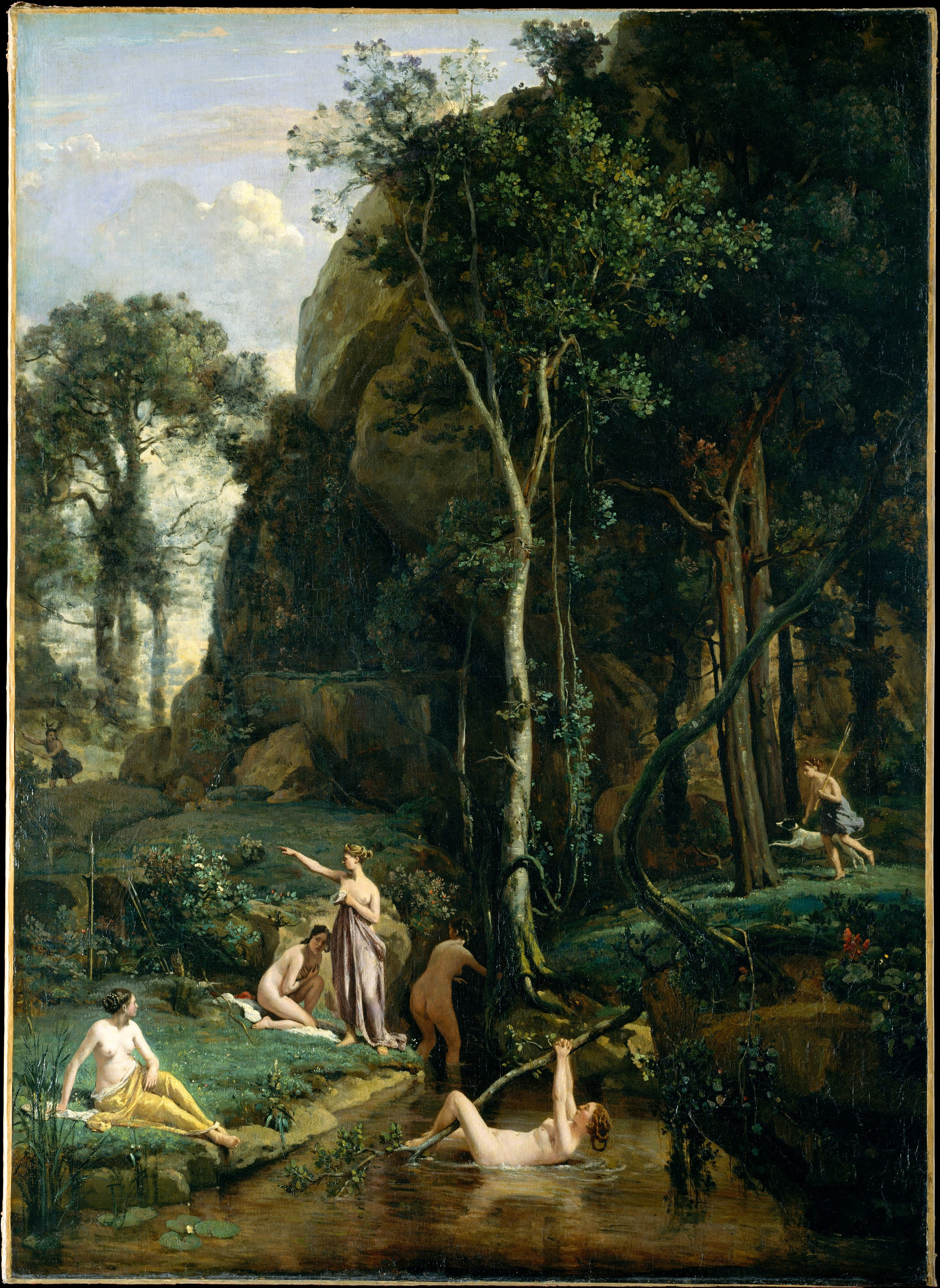
Diana and Actaeon by Jean-Baptiste-Camille Corot

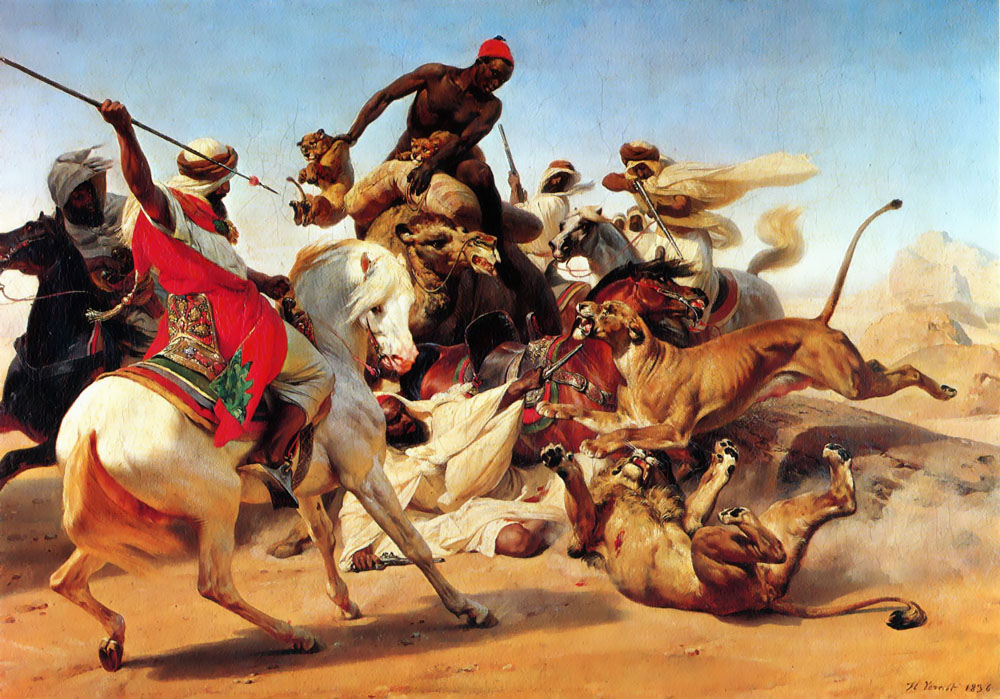
The Lion Hunt by Horace Vernet

== Bibliography ==
- Allard, Sébastien & Fabre, Côme. Delacroix. Metropolitan Museum of Art, 2018.
- Boime, Albert. Art in an Age of Counterrevolution, 1815-1848. University of Chicago Press, 2004.
- Brown, Marilyn R. The Gamin de Paris in Nineteenth-Century Visual Culture: Delacroix, Hugo, and the French Social Imaginary. Taylor & Francis, 2017.
- Falkayn, David A Guide to the Life, Times, and Works of Victor Hugo. The Minerva Group, 2001.
- Goldstein, Robert Justin. Out of Sight: Political Censorship of the Visual Arts in Nineteenth-century France. Yale University Press, 2012.
- Harkett, Daniel & Hornstein, Katie (ed.) Horace Vernet and the Thresholds of Nineteenth-Century Visual Culture. Dartmouth College Press, 2017.
- Hensel, Titia. Das Bild der Herrscherin: Franz Xaver Winterhalter und die Gattungspolitik des Porträts im 19. Jahrhundert. Walter de Gruyter, 2023.
- Hornstein, Katie. Picturing War in France, 1792–1856. Yale University Press, 2018.
- Norman, Geraldine. Nineteenth-century Painters and Painting: A Dictionary. University of California Press, 1977.
- Rosenthal, Leon. Romanticism. Parkstone International, 2014.
- Sitzia, Emilie. Art in Literature, Literature in Art in 19th Century France. Cambridge Scholars Publishing, 2011
