= The Battle of Wagram =

Painting by Horace Vernet

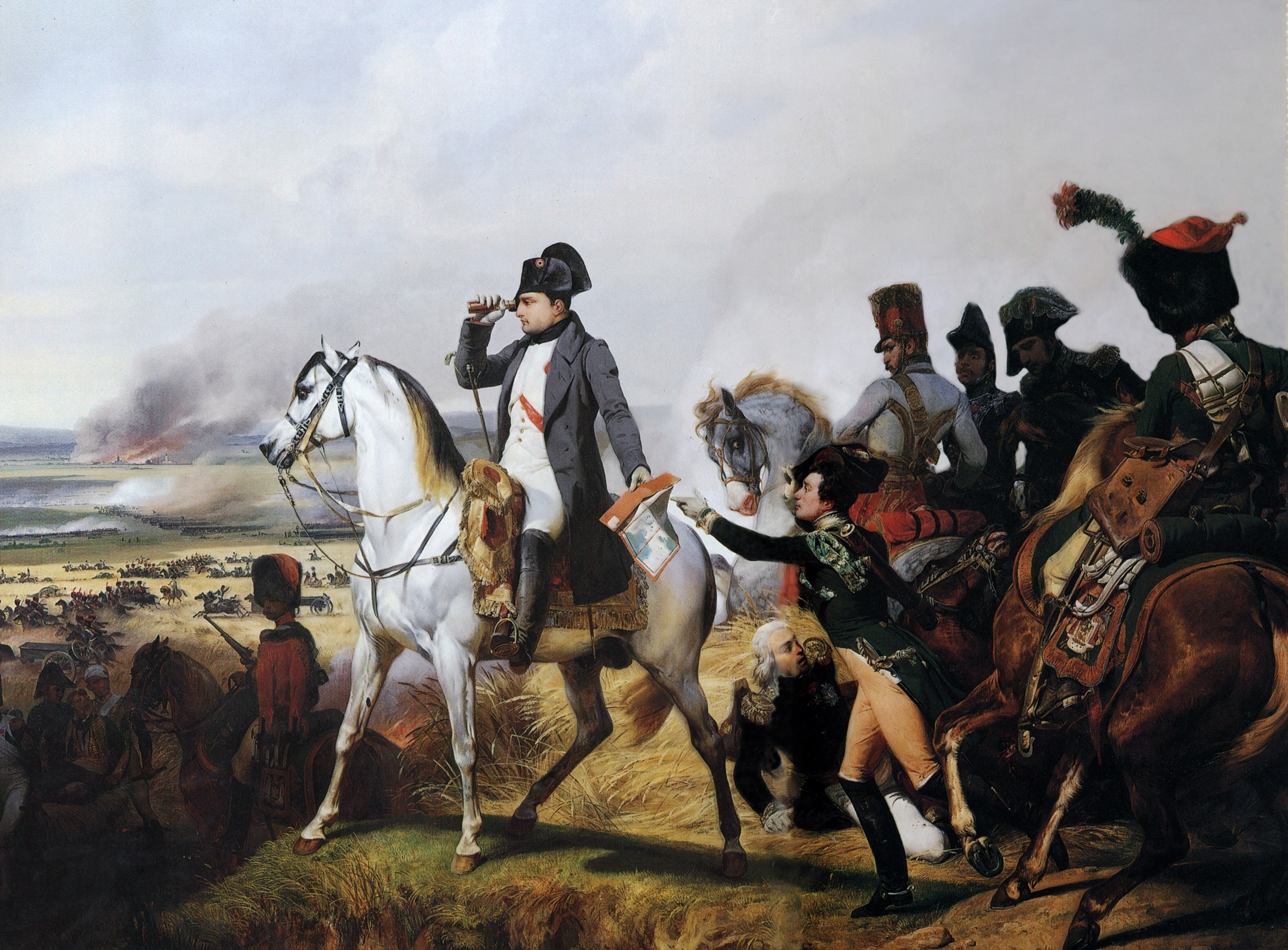
- Artist: Horace Vernet
- Year: 1836
- Medium: Oil on canvas
- Dimensions: 465 cm × 543 cm (183 in × 214 in)
- Location: Palace of Versailles, Versailles

The Battle of Wagram (French: Bataille de Wagram, 6 Juillet 1809) is an 1836 history painting by the French artist Horace Vernet. It depicts Napoleon at the Battle of Wagram fought in July 1809 during the War of the Fifth Coalition. The battle, part of the Napoleonic Wars, was a victory for the French over the Austrian forces under Archduke Charles. Napoleon is mounted, watching the battle progress through a spyglass while he holds a half-opened battle plan in the other. Behind him Jean-Baptiste Bessières had his horse shot from under him.

It commissioned during the July Monarchy by Louis Philippe I who as part of the restoration of the Palace of Versailles as a museum created the Galerie des Batailles filled with paintings of historic French victories. Vernet was commissioned to produce three of these works with depictions of Wagram, The Battle of Friedland and The Battle of Jena. It was exhibited at the Salon of 1836.

== See also ==
- The Passage of the Danube by Napoleon Before the Battle of Wagram, an 1810 painting by Jacques François Joseph Swebach-Desfontaines
- The Battle of Aspern-Essling, an 1820 painting by Johann Peter Krafft depicting an Austrian victory during the same campaign

== Bibliography ==
- Day-Hickman, Barbara Ann. Napoleonic Art: Nationalism and the Spirit of Rebellion in France (1815–1848). University of Delaware Press, 1999.
- Gengembre, Gérard. Napoleon: History and Myth. Hachette Illustrated, 2003.
- Hornstein, Katie. Picturing War in France, 1792–1856. Yale University Press, 2018.
