= The Lion in Love =

The Lion in Love may refer to:

- The Lion in Love (fable), one of Aesop's Fables
- The Lion in Love (play), a 1960 play by British writer Shelagh Delaney
- The Lion in Love (painting), an 1836 painting by Camille Roqueplan
