= Diana and Actaeon (Corot) =

Painting by Jean-Baptiste-Camille Corot

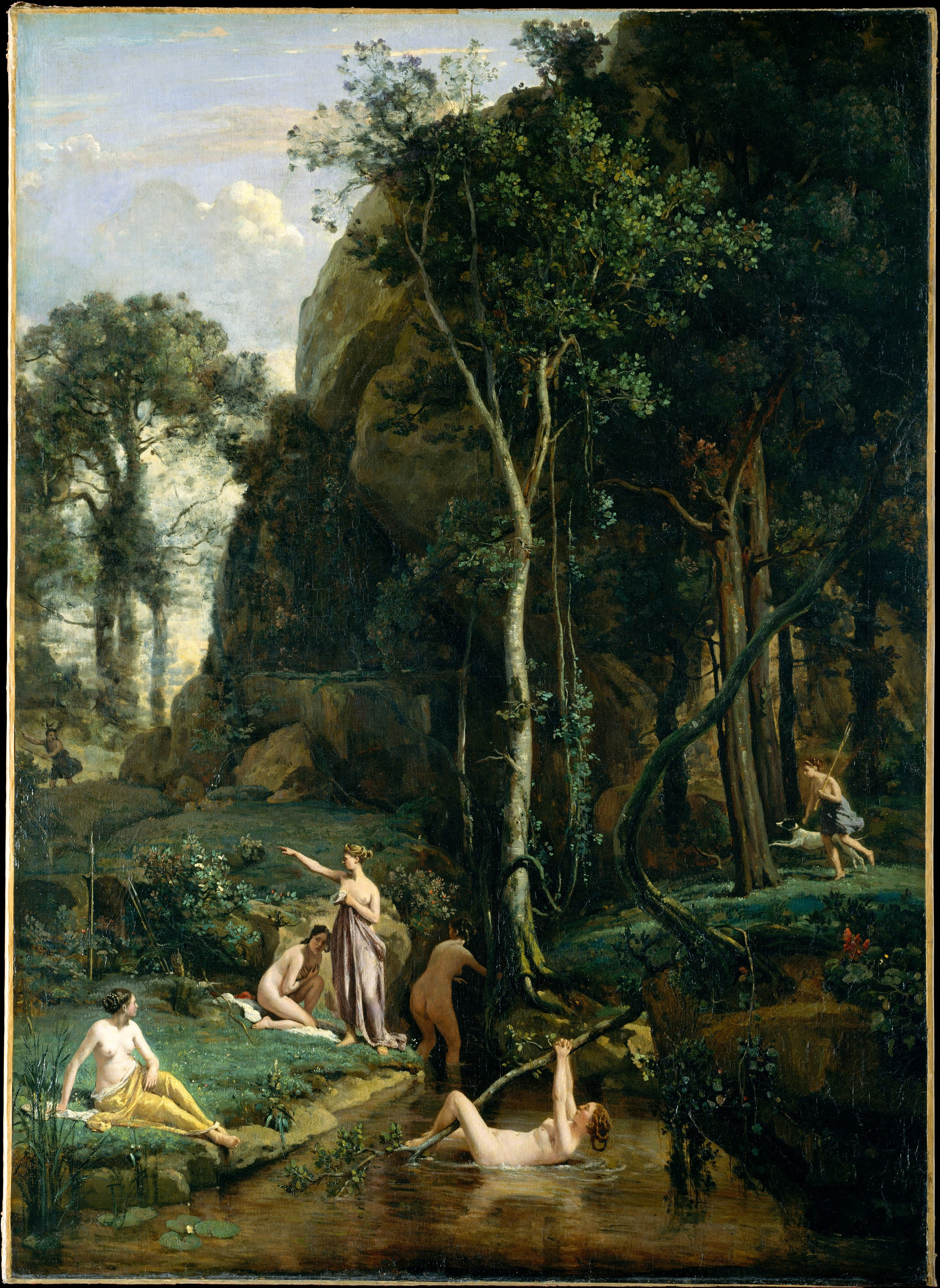
- Artist: Jean-Baptiste-Camille Corot
- Year: 1836
- Type: Oil on canvas, historical landscape painting
- Dimensions: 156.5 cm × 112.7 cm (61.6 in × 44.4 in)
- Location: Metropolitan Museum of Art; New York

Diana and Actaeon is an oil on canvas history painting by the French artist Jean-Baptiste-Camille Corot, from 1836. It is held at the Metropolitan Museum of Art, in New York.

== History and description ==
It depicts a scene from the story of Diana and Actaeon based on the Roman poet Ovid's Metamorphoses. Actaeon, a young hunter, comes across the goddess Diana and her nymphs enjoying a nude swim in the woods. In a fit of fury Diana transforms him into a deer. The painting is also known by the alternative title Diana Surprised in Her Bath.

The work was displayed at the Salon of 1836 at the Louvre in Paris. Today the painting is in the collection of the Metropolitan Museum of Art, having been acquired in 1975.

== Bibliography ==
- Baetjer, Katharine. European Paintings in the Metropolitan Museum of Art by Artists Born Before 1865. Metropolitan Museum of Artz, 1995.
- Tinterow, Gary, Pantazzi, Michael & Pomarède, Vincent. Corot. Metropolitan Museum of Art, 1996.
