= An Episode from the Russian Campaign =

Painting by Nicolas-Toussaint Charlet

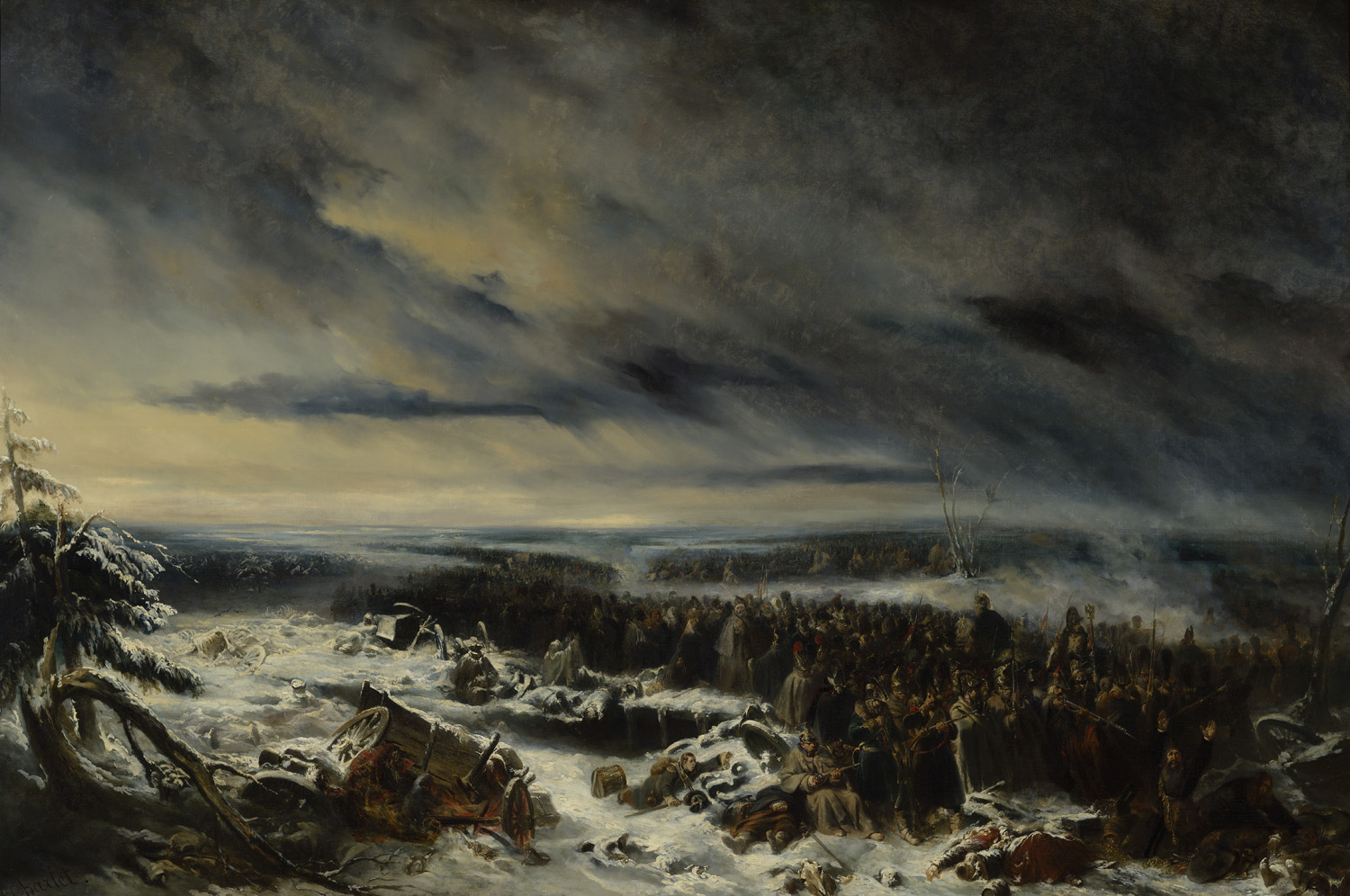
An Episode from the Russian Campaign (1836) by Nicolas-Toussaint Charlet

An Episode from the Russian Campaign (French - Épisode de la campagne de Russie) is an 1836 oil on canvas painting by Nicolas-Toussaint Charlet, now in the Museum of Fine Arts of Lyon. It shows the retreat from Moscow in 1812 at the end of the French invasion of Russia. It was exhibited at the Salon of 1836.

== Sources ==
- http://www.mba-lyon.fr/mba/sections/fr/collections-musee/peintures/oeuvres-peintures/xixe_siecle/campagne-de-russie
