= The Battle of Lauffeld (painting) =

Painting by Auguste Couder

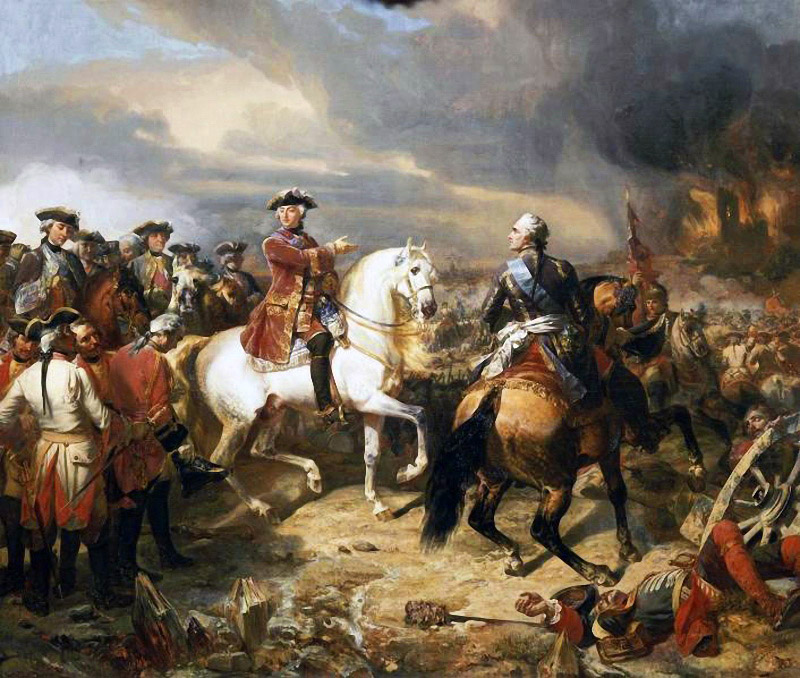
- Artist: Auguste Couder
- Year: 1836
- Medium: Oil on canvas
- Dimensions: 465 cm × 543 cm (183 in × 214 in)
- Location: Palace of Versailles, Versailles

The Battle of Lauffeld (French: Bataille de Lawfeld) is an 1836 history painting by the French artist Auguste Couder. It portrays a view of the Battle of Lauffeld fought on 2 July 1747 during the War of the Austrian Succession. The battle, fought in Limburg ended in a French victory over the Pragmatic Army under the command of the Duke of Cumberland. The painting depicts a moment that the British Huguenot general John Ligonier was captured after leading a daring cavalry charge deep into the French lines. The French monarch Louis XV and his German-born Marshal Maurice de Saxe are shown on horseback.

The painting was commissioned in 1835 by the French monarch Louis Philippe I for the new Museum of French History at the Palace of Versailles. Couder was paid 12,000 Francs for producing the work. It was displayed at the Salon of 1836 held at the Louvre in Paris. Today the work is in the Galerie des Batailles at Versailles.

== Bibliography ==
- Esposito, Gabrielle. The British Army of George II, 1727–1760. Pen and Sword, 2024.
