= The Battle of Hohenlinden =

Painting by Henri Frédéric Schopin

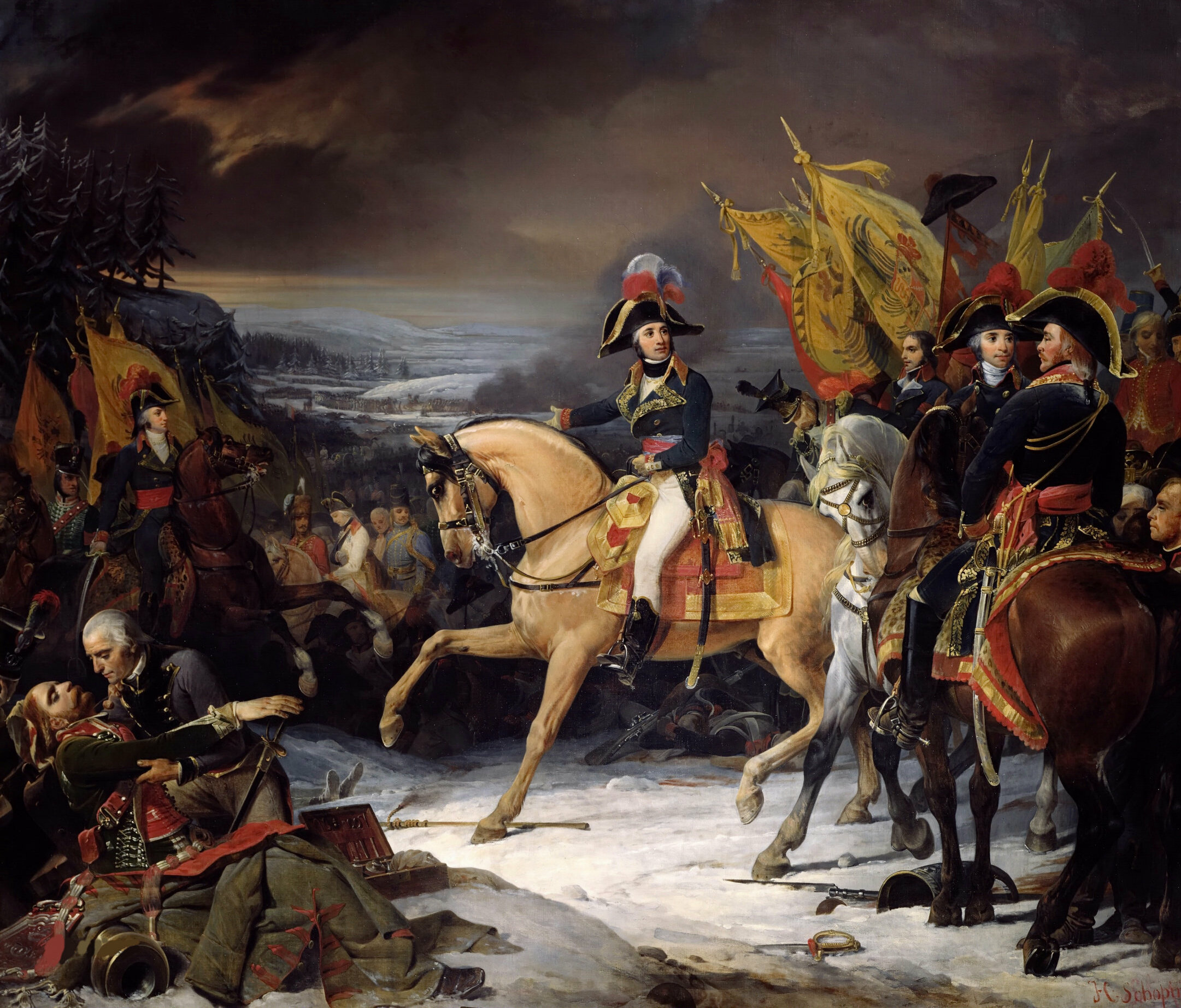
- Artist: Henri Frédéric Schopin
- Year: 1836
- Medium: Oil on canvas
- Dimensions: 465 cm × 543 cm (183 in × 214 in)
- Location: Palace of Versailles, Versailles

The Battle of Hohenlinden (French: Bataille de Hohenlinden) is an 1836 history painting by the French artist Henri Frédéric Schopin. It depicts the Battle of Hohenlinden fought on 3 December 1800 near Munich during the French Revolutionary Wars, where Jean Victor Marie Moreau led the Army of the Rhine of the French Republic to victory over the combined armies of Austria and Bavaria. Moreau is in the centre of the composition which also features Emmanuel de Grouchy, Michel Ney and Antoine Richepance.

During the July Monarchy of the 1830s, Louis Philippe I oversaw the restoration of the Palace of Versailles as a history museum. A large number of works were commissioned from leading artists for the reopened palace. Schopin was paid an initial 10,000 Francs in 1835 and a further 2,000 Francs the following year. The painting was exhibited at the Salon of 1836 at the Louvre in Paris. It today hangs in the Galerie des Batailles at Versailles.

== Bibliography ==
- Leggiere, Michael V. (ed.) Napoleon and the Operational Art of War. BRILL, 2020.
- Martin, Roger. La peinture napoléonienne après l'Empire: le Salon des artistes français de 1817 à 1914 et la vogue de la carte postale illustrée. Teissèdre, 2006.
- Schneider, Günter. Hohenlinden 1800: die vergessene Schlacht. K. Vowinckel, 2000.
