= The King Distributing Battalion Standards to the National Guard =

Painting by Joseph-Désiré Court

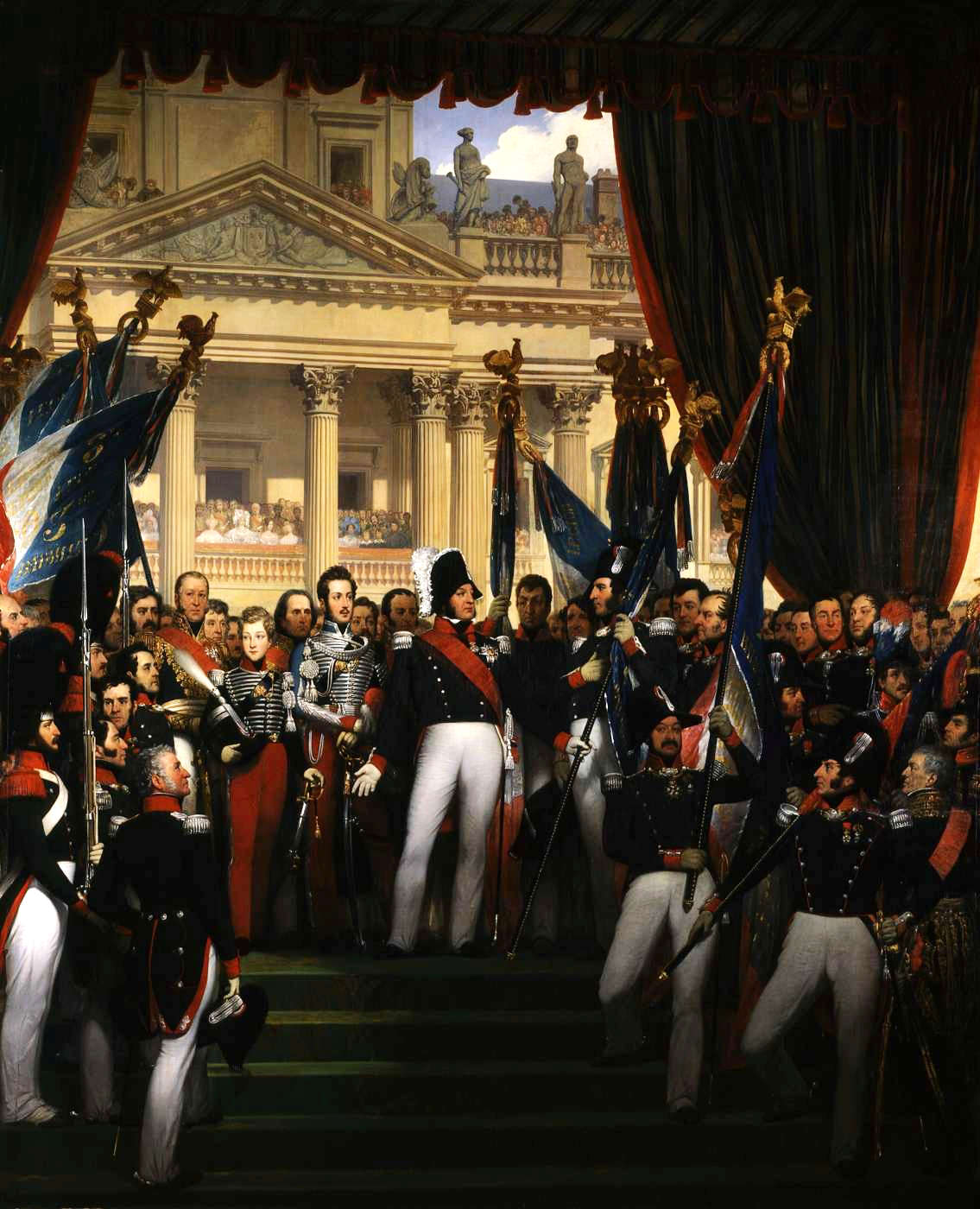
- Artist: Joseph-Désiré Court
- Year: 1836
- Type: Oil on canvas, history painting
- Dimensions: 550 cm × 442 cm (220 in × 174 in)
- Location: Palace of Versailles; Versailles

The King Distributing Battalion Standards to the National Guard is an 1836 history painting by the French artist Joseph-Désiré Court. It depicts a scene from the July Revolution of 1830 that overthrew Charles X and established the July Monarchy of Louis Philippe I. On 29 August 1830 the new monarch Louis Philippe conducted a review of the National Guard. The Marquis de Lafayette who had played a prominent role in the events, is shown only as a shadowy figure in the background.

Louis Philippe I chose to refurbish the neglected Palace of Versailles as a Museum celebrating French History. He commissioned a large number of paintings of scenes over the centuries, including a number depicting the recent revolution that had brought him to power. It was exhibited at the Salon of 1836 along with many other paintings Louis Philippe had commissioned for Versailles. Today it remains in the collection of the Palace of Versailles.

== Bibliography ==
- Boime, Albert. Art in an Age of Counterrevolution, 1815-1848. University of Chicago Press, 2004.
- Marrinan, Michael. Romantic Paris: Histories of a Cultural Landscape, 1800–1850. Stanford University Press, 2009.
