= The Battle of Jena =

Painting by Horace Vernet

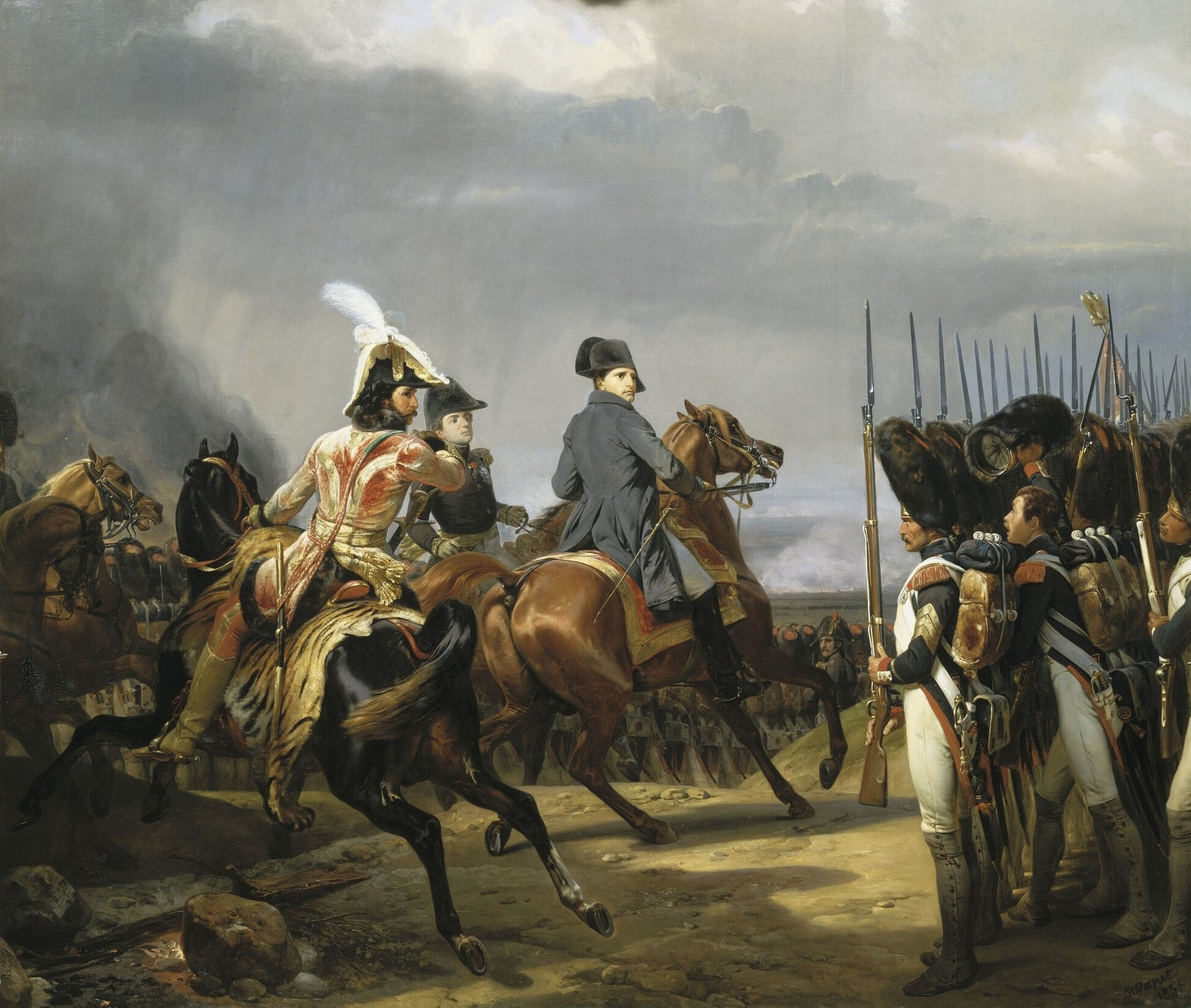
- Artist: Horace Vernet
- Year: 1836
- Medium: Oil on canvas
- Dimensions: 465 cm × 543 cm (183 in × 214 in)
- Location: Palace of Versailles, Versailles

The Battle of Jena is an 1836 history painting by the French artist Horace Vernet. It depicts the Battle of Jena fought on 14 October 1806. It portrays the French Emperor Napoleon on the field at Jena, one of his greatest victories during the Napoleonic Wars where he routed a Prussian force. Depicted to Napoleon's left are Marshals Murat and Berthier. The painting also depicts an incident from the battle. As Napoleon ordered a general attack, a grenadier of the Imperial Guard took off his bearskin and shouted "Forward!" Napoleon rebuked the soldier: "Only a beardless youth would presume to judge in advance what I should do."

The painting was commissioned by Louis Philippe I, who reigned during the July Monarchy. It was exhibited at the Salon of 1836 at the Louvre in Paris. It is today in the Galerie des Batailles at the Palace of Versailles along with other battle scenes by Vernet.

== Bibliography ==
- Hornstein, Katie. Picturing War in France, 1792–1856. Yale University Press, 2018.
- Perello, Chris. The Quest for Annihilation: The Role & Mechanics of Battle in the American Civil War. Strategy & Tactics Press, 2009.
