= Henri Frédéric Schopin =

French painter (1804–1880)

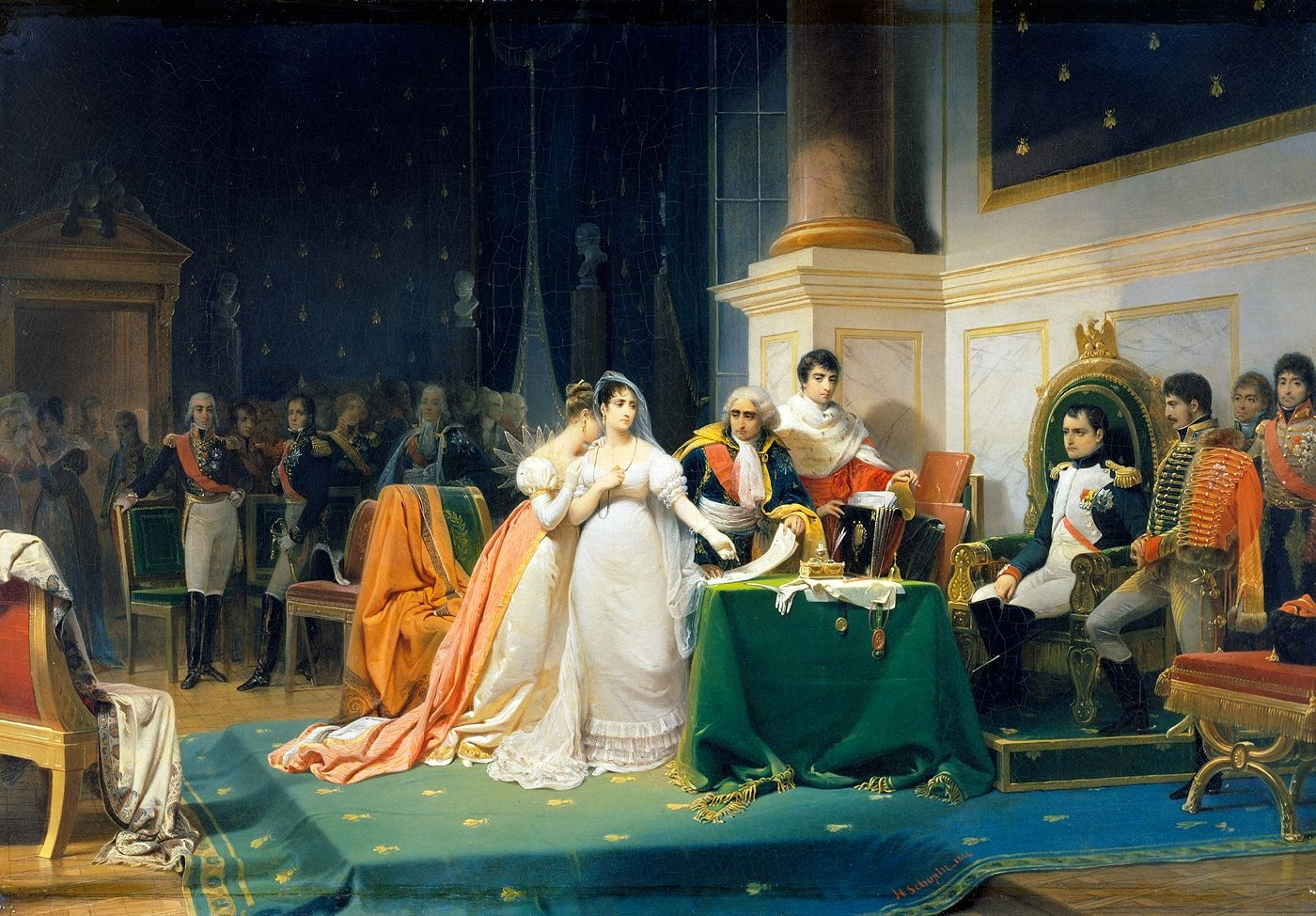
The Divorce of the Empress Josephine, 1846, Wallace Collection, London.

Henri Frédéric Schopin (12 June 1804 - 21 October 1880) was a French painter. He was the winner of the Prix de Rome for painting in 1831.

== Biography ==
Born in Germany to French parents, Henri-Frédéric Schopin was the son of the sculptor Jean-Louis-Théodore Chopin and the brother of the polygrapher Jean-Marie Chopin.

He was a student of Antoine-Jean Gros. He won the Prix de Rome in painting in 1831 for Achilles pursued by the Xanthus. He made his debut at the Salon of 1835 with four works: Les Derniers Moments des Cenci, Charles IX signant l'acte de la Saint-Barthélémy, Une fontaine à Albano and Une jeune fille et sa chèvre.

He was one of the hosts of the La Childebert workshop at rue Childebert, 9, in Paris.

Through his marriage in 1830 to Nathalie-Sophie Dailly (1810-1895), he became the son-in-law of the actor Armand-Dailly, a member of the Comédie-Française. He died aged 76 years old and was buried in the cemetery of Montigny-sur-Loing.

== Gallery ==
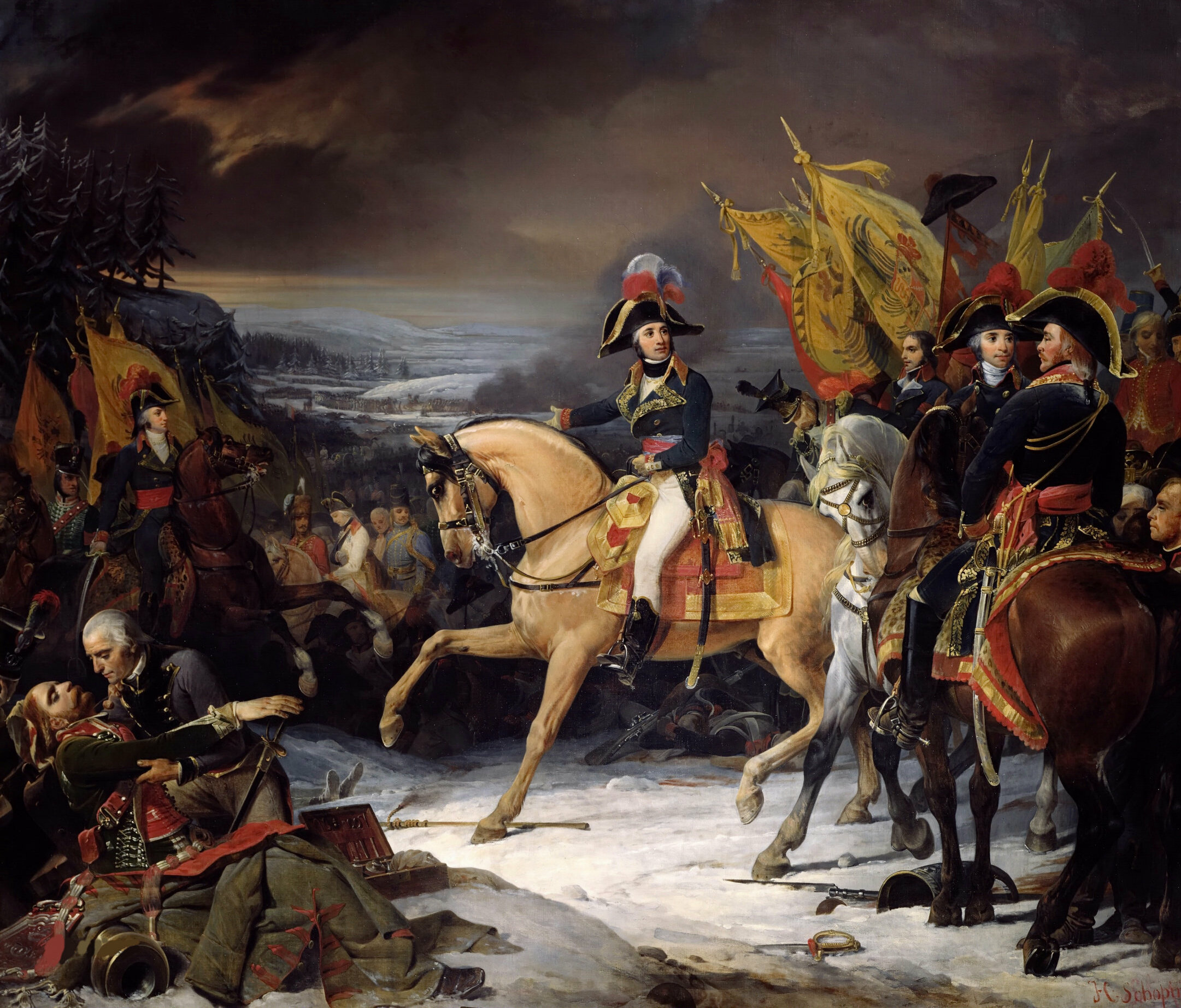
The Battle of Hohenlinden, 1836

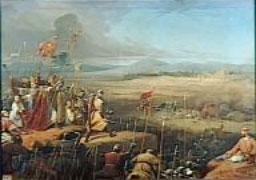
Battle Under the Walls of Antioch, 1838
