= The Lion in Love (painting) =

Painting by Camille Roqueplan

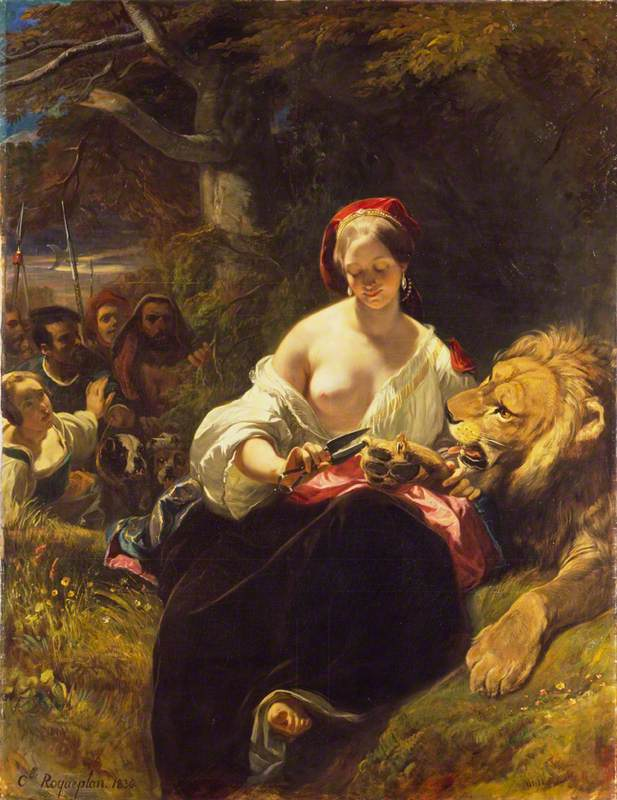
Camille Roqueplan: The Lion in Love (1836). Oil on canvas, 195,5 × 153 cm. Wallace Collection, London

The Lion in Love is an 1836 oil on canvas painting in the Academic-Romantic style by Camille Roqueplan (1800–1855) now in the Wallace Collection in London.

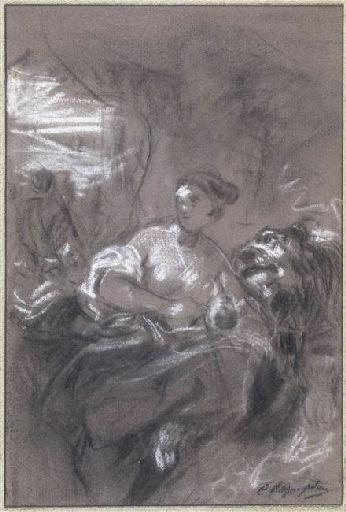
Camille Roqueplan: The Lion in Love, o. J.; Preparatory drawing in chalk. Musée national Magnin, Dijon

It shows a scene of a lion allowing its claws to be pared after falling in love with a shepherdess so that he will not endanger her, told in Jean de La Fontaine's fable Le Lion amoureux , though the painter adds an erotic undercurrent reminiscent of Delilah cutting Samson's hair as well as a Romantic spin on Beauty and the Beast by making the woman the one to pare the claws, thus portraying female beauty as life-threatening, maddening and ultimately fatal. It also forms part of a contemporary fashion for the femme fatale in literature, art and opera.

It was first exhibited at the Salon of 1836 in Paris under the title Le Lion amoureux, before being acquired by Louis-Philippe of France's son and heir Ferdinand Philippe. His widow Helene then sold it on 18 January 1853 in Paris to Richard Seymour-Conway, 4th Marquess of Hertford, whose illegitimate son Sir Richard Wallace inherited it with the rest of the Marquess' art collection.

== Bibliography ==
- (in French) Theophile Gautier: Camille Roqueplan. In: Histoire du romantisme. G. Charpentier et Cie, libraires-editeures, 1874; S. 191–199; S. 195 (Online frz.)
- (in French) Jean de La Fontaine: Le Lion amoureux. In: Les Fables; livre IV, 1. 1668/1694 (Online bei Encyclopédie de L'Agora; frz.)
