= The Battle of Friedland (painting) =

Painting by Horace Vernet

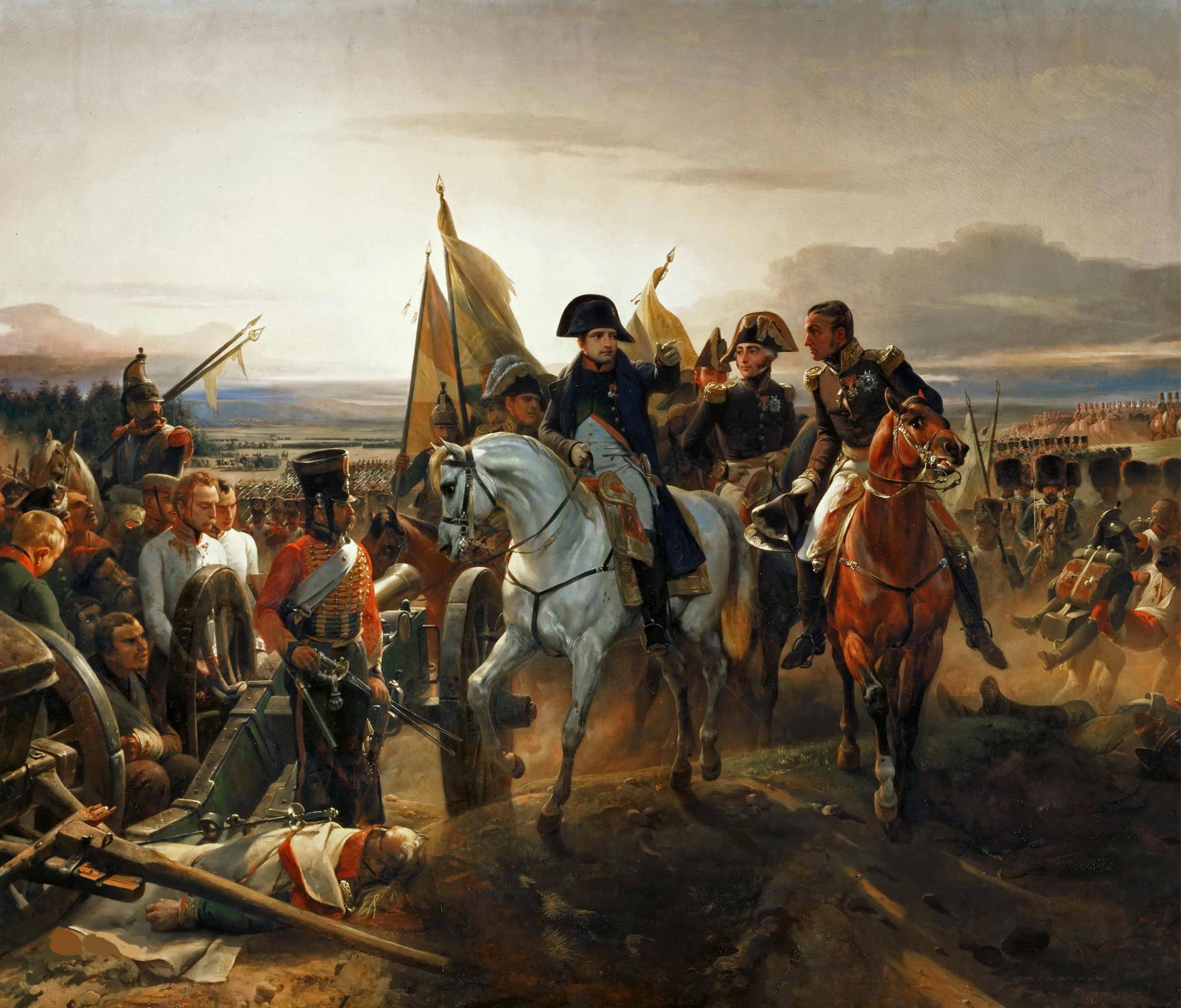
- Artist: Horace Vernet
- Year: 1835
- Medium: Oil on canvas
- Dimensions: 465 cm × 543 cm (183 in × 214 in)
- Location: Palace of Versailles, Versailles

The Battle of Friedland (French: Bataille de Friedland, 14 juin 1807) is an 1835 history painting by the French artist Horace Vernet. It depicts the Battle of Friedland fought on 14 June 1807 in East Prussia during the Napoleonic Wars. The battle was a decisive victory for French forces over their Russian enemies. At the subsequent Treaty of Tilsit, Napoleon was able to dictate peace terms to his beaten opponents. It is also sometimes known as Napoleon at the Battle of Friedland.

Vernet was a leading history painting in Restoration France. He depicted a number of French victories during the Napoleonic Era as well as more contemporary paintings of the French Conquest of Algeria. He depicts Napoleon issuing orders to Marshal Nicolas Oudinot with Etienne de Nansouty and Marshal Ney behind them. It was exhibited at the Salon of 1836 in Paris. It is now on display in the Galerie des Batailles at the Palace of Versailles.

== See also ==
- Vive L'Empereur, an 1891 painting by Édouard Detaille depicting the battle

== Bibliography ==
- Harkett, Daniel; Hornstein, Katie, eds. (2017). Horace Vernet and the Thresholds of Nineteenth-Century Visual Culture. Dartmouth College Press.
- Hornstein, Katie (2018). Picturing War in France, 1792–1856. Yale University Press.
- Thuillier, Jacques (2003). History of Art. Flammarion.
