= The Battle of Fontenoy =

Painting by Horace Vernet

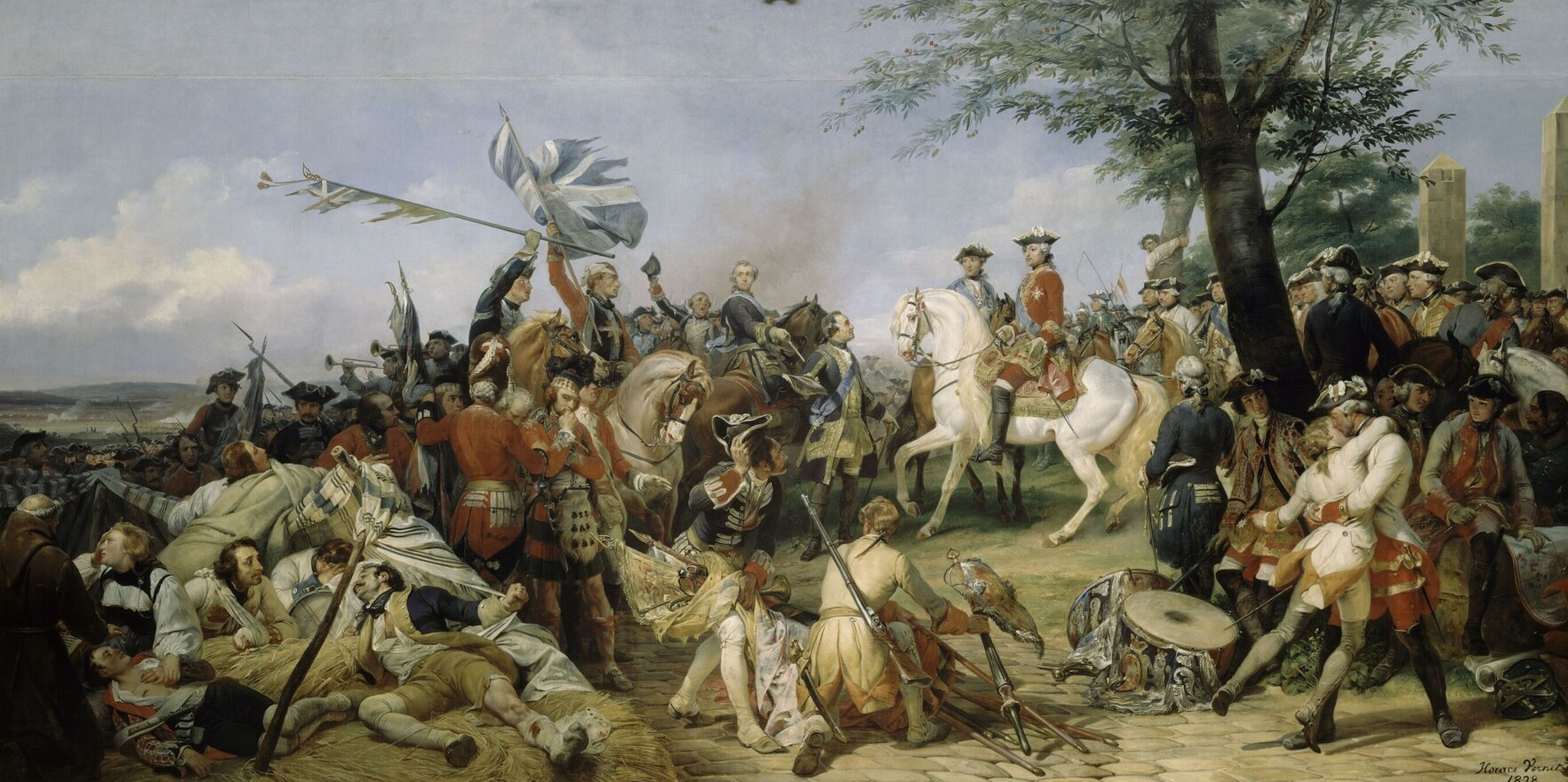
- Artist: Horace Vernet
- Year: 1828
- Medium: Oil on canvas
- Dimensions: 510 cm × 958 cm (200 in × 377 in)
- Location: Palace of Versailles, Versailles

The Battle of Fontenoy (French: La bataille de Fontenoy) is an 1828 history painting by the French artist Horace Vernet.

== History ==
It depicts the Battle of Fontenoy fought on the 11 May 1745 in modern-day Belgium. Part of the War of the Austrian Succession, Fontenoy was a notable French victory over Allied forces under the command of Duke of Cumberland.

Vernet became known for his battle scenes portraying the recent Napoleonic Wars, but for this work featured a victory of the Ancien régime in the mid-eighteenth century. It included depictions of Louis XV and Louis, Dauphin of France, respectively the grandfather and father of the reigning monarch Charles X. French commander Maurice de Saxe is dismounted and doffing his hat to the mounted Louis and Dauphin as captured British and Dutch colours are presented to him. British prisoners of war are huddled together in the left foreground while on the right a father embraces his son who has been awarded the Order of Saint Louis for gallantry.

It appeared at the Paris Salon of 1836. It is now on display in the Gallery of Battle at the Musée de l'Histoire de France at the Palace of Versailles.

== Bibliography ==
- Boime, Albert. Art in an Age of Counterrevolution, 1815–1848. University of Chicago Press, 2004.
- Harkett, Daniel & Hornstein, Katie (ed.) Horace Vernet and the Thresholds of Nineteenth-Century Visual Culture. Dartmouth College Press, 2017.
- Meisel, Martin. Realizations: Narrative, Pictorial, and Theatrical Arts in Nineteenth-Century England. Princeton University Press, 2014.
