= 1723 in art =

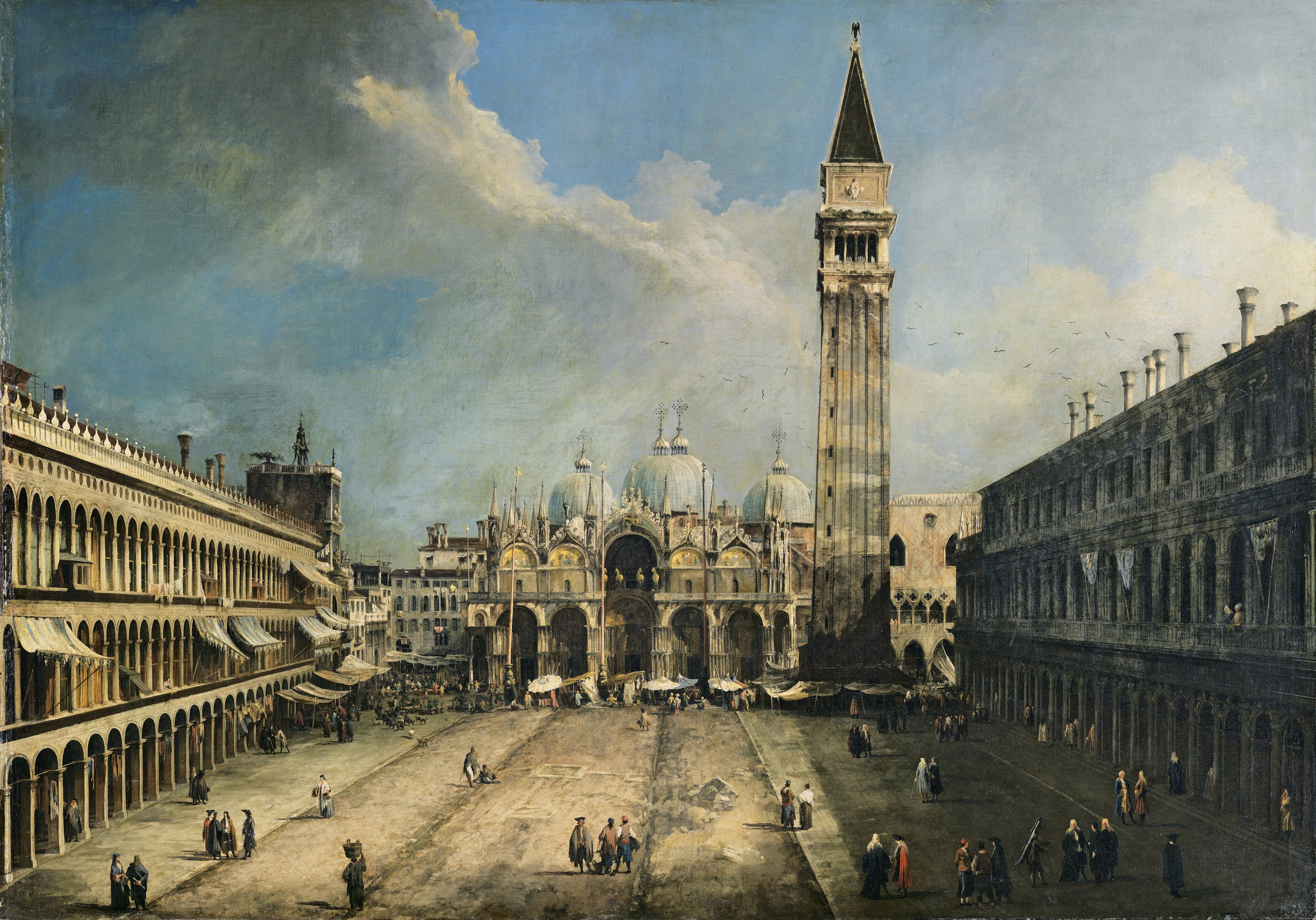

Events from the year 1723 in art.

== Events ==
- Following Sir Godfrey Kneller's death, the Irish-born Charles Jervas succeeds him as Principal Portrait Painter to King George I of Great Britain.
- Scottish-born painter William Aikman settles in London as a portraitist under the patronage of John Campbell, Duke of Argyll.
- Nishikawa Sukenobu publishes the set of prints One Hundred Women Classified According to their Rank (Hyakunin joro shina-sadame) in 2 volumes.
- Sculptor Mario Diamanti begins work on the monumental façade of St. Sebastian, Palazzolo Acreide, Sicily.

== Paintings ==
- William Aikman – Portrait of Lady Anne Cochrane
- Canaletto – Architectural Capriccio (his first known signed and dated work)
- Thomas Gibson – Portrait of George Vertue
- François Lemoyne – Perseus and Andromeda
- Jean Ranc – The Family of Philip V
- Hyacinthe Rigaud – Portrait of Cardinal Dubois
- Christian Friedrich Zincke – Catherine Edwin (miniature)

== Births ==
- February 3 – Catherine Read, Scottish portrait-painter (died 1778)
- April 12 – Franz Anton Bustelli, Swiss-born Bavarian porcelain modeller (died 1763)
- May 6 – Ike no Taiga, Japanese painter and calligrapher (died 1776)
- July 2 - Václav Bernard Ambrosi, Czech miniature painter (died 1806)
- July 16 – Joshua Reynolds, English painter, specializing in portraits (died 1792)
- October 17 – Pierre-Antoine Baudouin, French miniature painter and engraver (died 1769)
- October 23 - Pierre-François Basan, French engraver (died 1797)
- November 14 – Johann Ludwig Aberli, Swiss landscape painter and etcher (died 1786)
- date unknown
  - Giorgio Anselmi, Italian painter (died 1797)
  - Johann Karl Auerbach, Austrian painter (died 1786)
  - William Baillie, Irish engraver (died 1792)
  - Maria Carowsky, Swedish artist (died 1793)
  - Giovanni Battista Chiappe, Italian painter (died 1765)
  - Gavin Hamilton, Scottish neoclassical history painter (died 1798)
  - Giacomo Leonardis, Italian engraver and etcher (died 1794)
  - Domenico Quaglio the Elder, Italian painter (died 1760)
  - Antonio González Velázquez, Spanish late-Baroque painter (died 1793)

== Deaths ==
- February 11 - Heinrich Meyring, German sculptor (born 1628)
- March – Lancelot Volders, Flemish painter (buried in Brussels on 23 March; born 1636)
- October 19 – Sir Godfrey Kneller, English court painter (born 1646)
- December 6 – Amalia Pachelbel, German painter and engraver (born 1688)
- date unknown
  - Giacinto Garofalini, Italian painter (born 1661)
  - Maria Cattarina Locatelli, Italian painter from Bologna (born unknown)
  - Angelo Massarotti, Italian painter active in his native Cremona (born 1653)
