= 1797 in art =

Events from the year 1797 in art.

== Events ==
- Musée des Beaux-Arts d'Orléans established in France.

== Works ==
- Caspar David Friedrich – Landscape with Temple in Ruins
- Lemuel Francis Abbott – Portrait of Joseph Nollekens
- Louis Gauffier – Pygmalion and Galatea
- François Gérard – Belisarius
- Francisco Goya – Bernardo de Iriarte
- Anton Graff – Elisa von der Recke
- Henry Howard – Anne Flaxman (approximate date)
- Thomas Lawrence – Portrait of Sir Edward Pellew
- Philip James de Loutherbourg – The Great Fire of London
- James Northcote – Lafayette in the Dungeon of Olmütz
- John Opie – The Death of Archbishop Sharpe
- Henry Tresham – The Earl of Warwick's Vow Previous to The Battle of Towton

== Births ==
- January 19 – Cornelia Aletta van Hulst, Dutch painter (died 1870)
- April 5 – Johann Fischbach, Austrian painter of landscapes and genre art (died 1871)
- May 29 – Louise-Adéone Drölling, French painter and draughtswoman (died 1836)
- June 13 – Louis Pierre Henriquel-Dupont, French engraver (died 1892)
- July 12 – Adele Schopenhauer, German papercut artist and novelist (died 1849)
- June 16 – Sophie Fremiet, French painter (died 1867)
- July 17 – Hippolyte Delaroche, French painter (died 1856)
- August 8 – Joseph-Nicolas Robert-Fleury, French painter (died 1890)
- August 20 – Johan Frederik Møller, Danish painter and photographer (died 1871)
- September 5 – John Blennerhassett Martin, American painter, engraver and lithographer (died 1857)
- September 13 – Joseph Stannard, English painter of the Norwich school (died 1830)
- September 19 – Jan Suchodolski, Polish painter and Army officer (died 1875)
- September 25 – Cornelis Kruseman, Dutch painter (died 1857)
- October 9 – Henry Collen, English Royal miniature portrait painter (died 1879)
- October 29 – Friedrich Loos, Austrian Biedermeier style painter, etcher and lithographer (died 1890)
- date unknown
  - Tivadar Alconiere, Hungarian painter (died 1865)
  - Tommaso Benedetti, English-born Austrian painter (died 1863)
  - Louis-Henri Brévière, French wood-engraver (died 1869)
  - Joseph-Désiré Court, French painter of historical subjects and portraits (died 1865)
  - Hiroshige, Japanese ukiyo-e artist (died 1858)
  - Louis Stanislas Marin-Lavigne, French painter and lithographer (died 1860)
  - Nicolae Teodorescu, Moldavian, later Romanian church painter (muralist) (died 1880)
- probable
  - John O'Keeffe, Irish portrait and figure painter (died 1838)
  - Utagawa Kuniyoshi, Japanese artist of the ukiyo-e style of woodblock prints and painting and belonged to the Utagawa school (died 1861)

== Deaths ==
- February 12 – Pierre-François Basan, French engraver (born 1723)
- March 6 – William Hodges, English landscape painter (born 1744)
- March 30 – Giorgio Anselmi, Italian painter (born 1723)
- April 4– Pierre-François Berruer, French sculptor (born 1733)
- June 23 – Antonio Diziani, Italian painter of veduta, landscapes and vistas (born 1737)
- July 18 – Jean-Bernard Restout, French painter (born 1732)
- August 18 – Josiah Spode, English potter (born 1733)
- August 29 – Joseph Wright of Derby, English painter (born 1734)
- September 29 - George Raper, English nature artist (born 1769)
- December 14 – John Robert Cozens, English draftsman and painter of romantic watercolor landscapes (born 1752)
- date unknown
  - Manuel Francisco Álvarez de la Peña, Spanish sculptor (born 1727)
  - Christina Elisabeth Carowsky, Swedish portrait painter (born 1745)
  - Charles Joseph Flipart, French painter and engraver (born 1721)
  - Emanuel Granberg, Finnish painter (born 1754)
  - Thomas Kirk, English painter, illustrator and engraver (born 1765)
