= 1906 in art =

Events from the year 1906 in art.

== Events ==
- September–October – First group exhibition by Die Brücke, in Dresden.
- Gwen John begins modelling for Auguste Rodin.
- Hilma af Klint begins painting abstract art, including the first of her Primordial Chaos series.
- Paula Modersohn-Becker begins a series of nude portraits of herself and of other women and children in Paris.
- Juan Gris, Amedeo Modigliani and Gino Severini all arrive in Paris.
- Walter Sickert paints music hall scenes in London and Paris.
- Ferdinand Preiss opens his workshop in Berlin.
- Museum of Fine Arts (Budapest) completed.
- Dritte Deutsche Kunstgewerbeausstellung Dresden (third German arts and crafts exhibition) took place in Dresden from May 12 to October 31

== Works ==
- Umberto Boccioni – Self-portrait
- Antoine Bourdelle – The Fruit (sculpture)
- Olga Boznańska – Portrait of a Lady in a White Hat
- Paul Cézanne – The Gardener Vallier
- Robert Delaunay – L'homme à la tulipe (Portrait de Jean Metzinger)
- André Derain
  - Charing Cross Bridge, London
  - The Pool of London
- Daniel Chester French and Edward Clark Potter
  - Equestrian statue of Charles Devens
  - Progress of the State (quadriga)
- J. W. Godward
  - Drusilla
  - Nerissa
  - The Tambourine Girl (two versions)
- Wilhelm Hammershoi – Interior
- William Le Baron Jenney and Charles Mulligan – Illinois Memorial
- Robert Henri – El Matador (Felix Asiego)
- Ishibashi Kazunori – Lady Reading Poetry
- Theo Alice Ruggles Kitson – The Hiker (statue)
- Peder Severin Krøyer – Midsummer Eve Bonfire on Skagen Beach

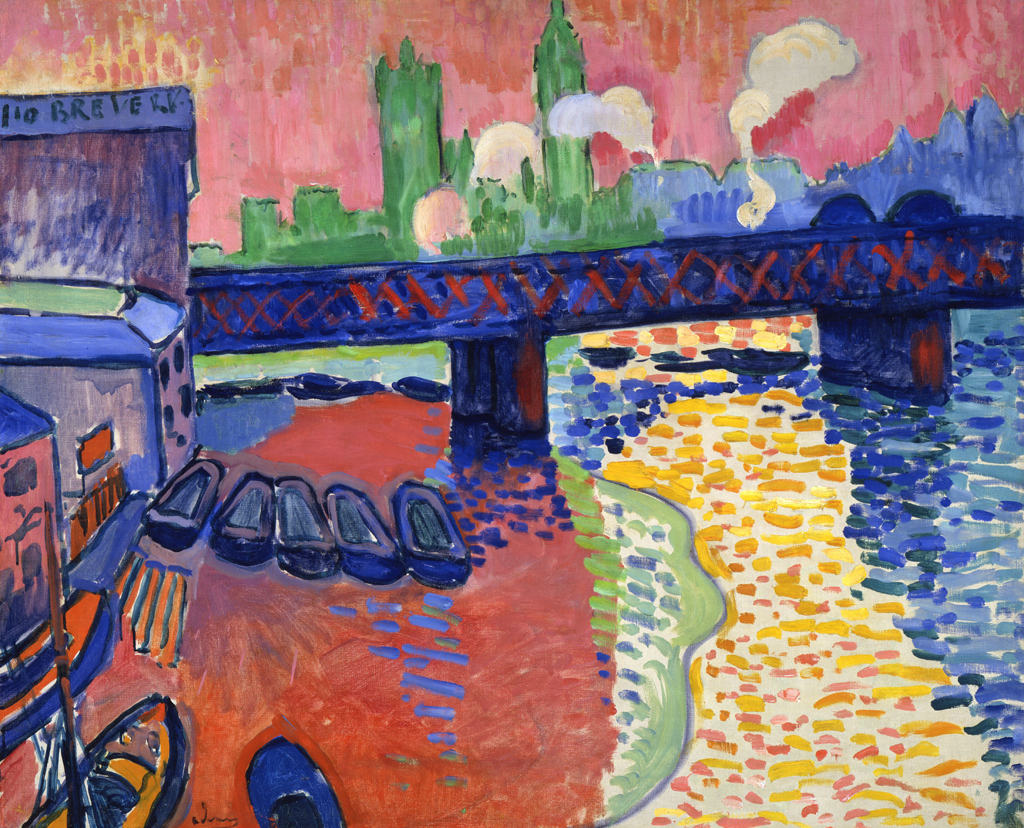
André Derain, Charing Cross Bridge, London (National Gallery of Art, Washington, D.C.)

- Albert Marquet
  - The Beach at Fécamp
  - Fécamp (The Beach at Sainte-Adresse)
- Henri Matisse
  - Le bonheur de vivre
  - Self-Portrait in a Striped T-shirt
  - The Young Sailor I
  - The Young Sailor II
- Willard Metcalf – May Night
- Jean Metzinger
  - Coucher de soleil no. 1
  - Femme au Chapeau
  - La danse (Bacchante)
  - Portrait de Robert Delaunay
- Paula Modersohn-Becker – Self-portrait
- Claude Monet – Water Lilies
- Edvard Munch
  - Portrait of Friedrich Nietzsche
  - Self-portrait with a bottle
- Mikhail Nesterov
  - Portrait of E. P. Nesterov
  - Portrait of Olga Nesterova (Woman in a Riding Habit)
- Maxfield Parrish – Old King Cole and his Fiddlers Three (mural at St. Regis Hotel, New York City)
- Pablo Picasso
  - Boy Leading a Horse
  - Head of a Young Woman
  - Portrait of Gertrude Stein
  - Self-Portrait with Palette
- Niko Pirosmani – Feast with Organ-Grinder Datiko Zemel
- Medardo Rosso – Ecce Puer (sculpted bust)
- John Singer Sargent – Self Portrait
- Zinaida Serebriakova – Country Girl
- Walter Sickert – La Hollandaise
- Franz von Stuck – Salome
- Albert Chevallier Tayler – Kent vs Lancashire at Canterbury
- Douglas Tilden – California Volunteers (sculpture, San Francisco)
- Ville Vallgren – Havis Amanda (bronze)

== Births ==
=== January to June ===
- January 2 – Hans Mertens, German painter (died 1944)
- January 3 – Óscar Domínguez, Spanish surrealist painter (died 1957)
- January 9 – Janko Brašić, Serbian painter (died 1994)
- January 13 – Burgoyne Diller, American abstract painter (died 1965)
- February 28 – Percy Shakespeare, English painter (died 1943)
- March 2 – Jessie Oonark, Canadian Inuk artist (died 1985)
- March 8 – Victor Hasselblad, Swedish inventor and photographer (died 1978)
- March 9 – David Smith, American abstract expressionist sculptor (died 1965)
- March 26 – Henri Cadiou, French realist painter and lithographer (died 1989)
- March 27 – Bernard Lefebvre, French photographer (died 1992)
- April 9 – Victor Vasarely, Hungarian-born French op artist (died 1997)
- April 11 – Dale Messick, first female syndicated comic strip artist in the United States (died 2005)
- April 14 – Elmyr de Hory, Hungarian-born painter and art forger (died 1976)
- April 21 – Lillian Browse, English art dealer and historian (died 2005)
- May 16 – Alfred Pellan, Canadian artist (died 1988)
- May 2 – Philippe Halsman, Latvian-born American portrait photographer (died 1979)
- May 20 – Leon Polk Smith, American painter (died 1996)
- June 9 – James Boswell, New Zealand painter and draughtsman (died 1971)
- June 18 – Anton Stankowski, German graphic designer, photographer and painter (died 1998)

=== July to December ===
- July 8 – Philip Johnson, American architect, art collector, curator (died 2005)
- August 12 – Tedd Pierce, American animated cartoon writer, animator and artist (died 1972)
- August 14 – Horst P. Horst, German American photographer (died 1999)
- August 20 – Heinz Henghes, German sculptor (died 1975)
- August 21 – Friz Freleng, American animator, cartoonist, director and producer (died 1995)
- September 5 – Ralston Crawford, Canadian-born American painter, lithographer and photographer (died 1978)
- October 18 – James Brooks, American painter and muralist (died 1992)
- October 24 – Marie-Louise von Motesiczky, Austrian painter (died 1996)
- October 27 – Peter Blume, American painter (died 1992)
- November 26 – Krystyna Dąbrowska, Polish sculptor and painter (died 1944)
- December 10 – Padraig Marrinan, Irish painter (died 1975)
- December 14 – Maxwell Bates, Canadian architect and expressionist painter (died 1980)
- December 27 – Andreas Feininger, French-born American photographer (died 1999)

== Deaths ==
- January 20 – Philippe Solari, French sculptor (born 1840)
- February – Charles-Auguste Lebourg, French sculptor (born 1829)
- February 14 – Carl Eneas Sjöstrand, Swedish sculptor (born 1828)
- March 5 – Hugh Ramsay, Australian painter (born 1877)
- March 17 – Thomas Dalziel, English engraver (born 1823)
- March 27 – Eugène Carrière, French Symbolist painter (born 1849)
- March 19 – Étienne Carjat, French portraitist (born 1828)
- March 29 – Slava Raskaj, Croatian watercolour painter (born 1877)
- April 5 – Wyke Bayliss, English painter (born 1835)
- April 14 – Walter Williams, English landscape painter (born 1834)
- April 19 – Daniel Huntington, American painter (born 1816)
- May – John Mulvany, Irish-born American painter (b. circa 1839)
- June 20 – John Clayton Adams, English landscape artist (born 1840)
- August 21 – Eugen Felix, Austrian painter (born 1836)
- August 29 – Alfred Stevens, Belgian painter (born 1828)
- October 2 – Raja Ravi Varma, Indian painter (born 1848)
- October 22 – Paul Cézanne, French painter (born 1839)
- October 28 – Jean Benner, French artist (born 1836)
- November 5 – Frits Thaulow, Norwegian Impressionist painter (born 1847)
- December 11 – Axel Lindahl, Swedish landscape photographer (born 1841)
- November 20 – Charles Eastlake, English architect and furniture designer (born 1836)
- December 31 – Julia Goodman, English portrait painter (born 1812)
- date unknown
  - Antonio Beato, Italian-born photographer (born c.1825)
  - Charles Edwin Fripp, English-born war artist (born 1854)
  - Maeda Genzō, Japanese photographer (born 1831)
  - William Linnell, British painter (born 1826)
