= 1765 in art =

Events from the year 1765 in art.

== Events ==
- June 12 – The death of General John Guise in London activates his 1760 bequest of a large collection of Old Master paintings to his alma mater, Christ Church, Oxford, where they are assembled in 1767 as the foundation of Christ Church Picture Gallery.
- September 23 - G. Van Oostrum's collection of paintings is sold at auction in The Hague. Smiling Girl, a Courtesan, Holding an Obscene Image is lot 241.
- The Uffizi in Florence is officially opened to the public as an art gallery.
- Irish sculptor Christopher Hewetson and American painter Henry Benbridge arrive in Rome, where Hewetson settles.
- The Hermitage Museum acquires the art collection of Heinrich von Brühl, including Perseus and Andromeda by Rubens.

== Works ==
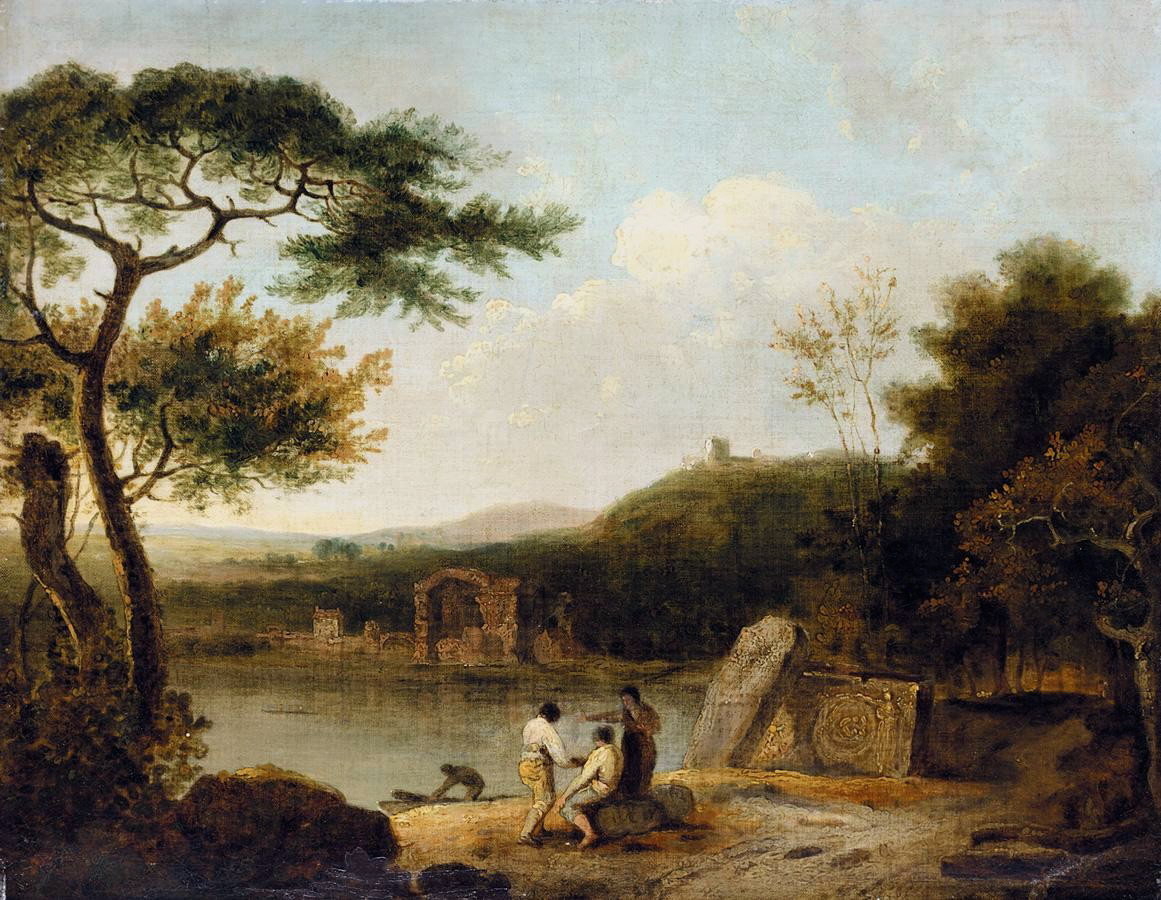
Richard Wilson, Lake Avernus I

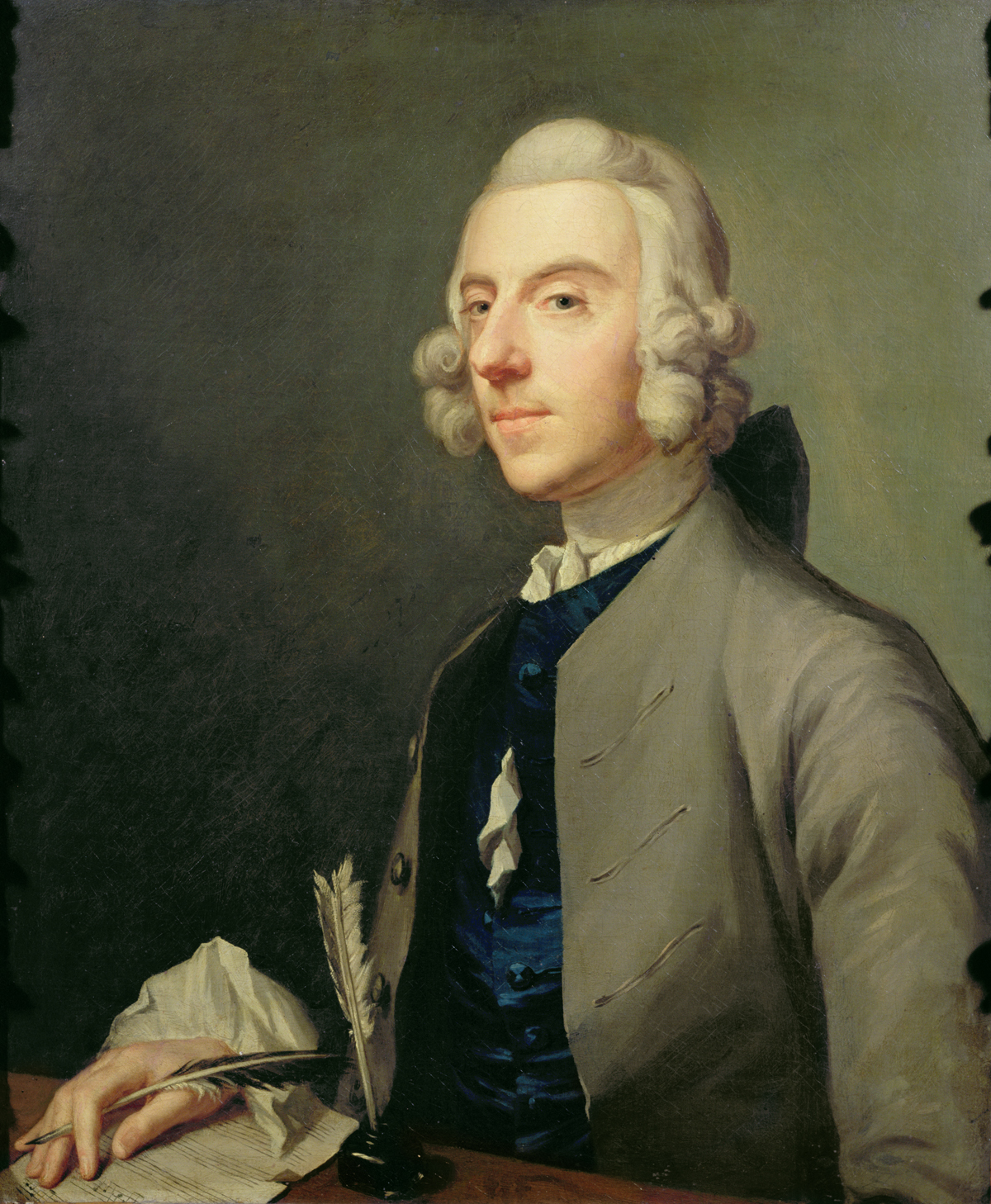
Portrait of Michael Arne by Johann Zoffany

- Francis Cotes – Portrait of Maria Walpole, Countess Waldegrave
- Nathaniel Dance – William Weddell, The Reverend William Palgrave and Mr Janson in Rome
- Jean-Honoré Fragonard – The High Priest Coresus Sacrificing Himself to Save Callirhoe
- Anton Graff – Self-portrait
- Noël Hallé
  - The Justice of Trajan
  - The Race Between Hippomenes and Atalanta
- Tilly Kettle – Mary Ann Yates as Mandane
- William Pars – The Parthenon when it contained a mosque (Published in James Stuart and Nicholas Revett, The Antiquities of Athens, London, 1789)
- Matthew Pratt – The American School
- Joshua Reynolds
  - Portrait of Lord Dunmore
  - Robert Clive and his family with an Indian maid
  - Portrait of Jeffery Amherst
- George Stubbs – Portrait of a Hunting Tyger (Cheetah with two Indian attendants and a stag)
- Charles-André van Loo – The Three Graces
- Richard Wilson
  - Diana and Callisto
  - Pembroke Town and Castle
- Joseph Wright of Derby – Peter Perez Burdett and His First Wife Hannah
- Johann Zoffany – David Garrick in The Provoked Wife

== Births ==
- February 21 – Michał Ceptowski, Bavarian born stucco artist who settles and worked in Poland (died 1829)
- March 3 – Francesco Alberi, Italian painter of historical scenes and frescoes (died 1836)
- March 7 – Nicéphore Niépce, French inventor and pioneer photographer (died 1833)
- April 1 – Luigi Schiavonetti, Italian artist (died 1810)
- May 7 – Giovanni Monti, Italian landscape painter (died 1825)
- May 13 – Vieira Portuense, Portuguese painter (died 1805)
- June 10 – Cladius Detlev Fritzsch, also known as C. D. Fritzsch, Danish flower painter (died 1841)
- December 3 – Adélaïde Dufrénoy, French poet and painter from Brittany (died 1825)
- date unknown
  - Pietro Bonato, Italian painter and engraver (died 1820)
  - Edme-François-Étienne Gois, French sculptor (died 1836)
  - Thomas Kirk, British painter and engraver (died 1797)
  - Domenico Vantini, Italian painter specializing in portrait miniatures (died 1825)
  - 1765/1770 – Fryderyk Bauman, Polish architect and sculptor-decorator (died 1845)

== Deaths ==
- February 10 – Jean-Baptiste-Henri Deshays, French painter (born 1729)
- April 15 – Mikhail Lomonosov, Russian polymath, scientist, writer and mosaic artist (born 1711)
- May – Joseph Badger, American portrait artist (born 1707)
- July 15 – Charles-André van Loo, French subject painter (born 1705), and a younger brother of Jean-Baptiste van Loo
- August 1 – Ulla Adlerfelt, Swedish painter and noblewoman (born 1736)
- August 18 – Jean-Joseph Balechou, French engraver (born 1715)
- September 5 – Johann Christian Fiedler, German portrait painter (born 1697)
- October 21 – Giovanni Paolo Pannini or Panini, Italian painter and architect, mainly known as one of the vedutisti or veduta or view painters (born 1691)
- December 5 – Johann Salomon Wahl, German painter who became court painter in Denmark (born 1689)
- date unknown
  - Pietro Campana, Spanish engraver (born 1727)
  - Giovanni Battista Chiappe, Italian painter of the late-Baroque period (born 1723)
  - Ercole Graziani the Younger, Italian painter (born 1688)
  - James MacArdell, Irish engraver of mezzotints (born 1729)
  - Zheng Xie, Chinese painter of orchids, bamboo, and stones; one of the Eight Eccentrics of Yangzhou (born 1693)
  - Giampietro Zanotti, Italian painter and art historian (born 1674)
