= Johan Ross the Elder =

Swedish painter (1695–1773)

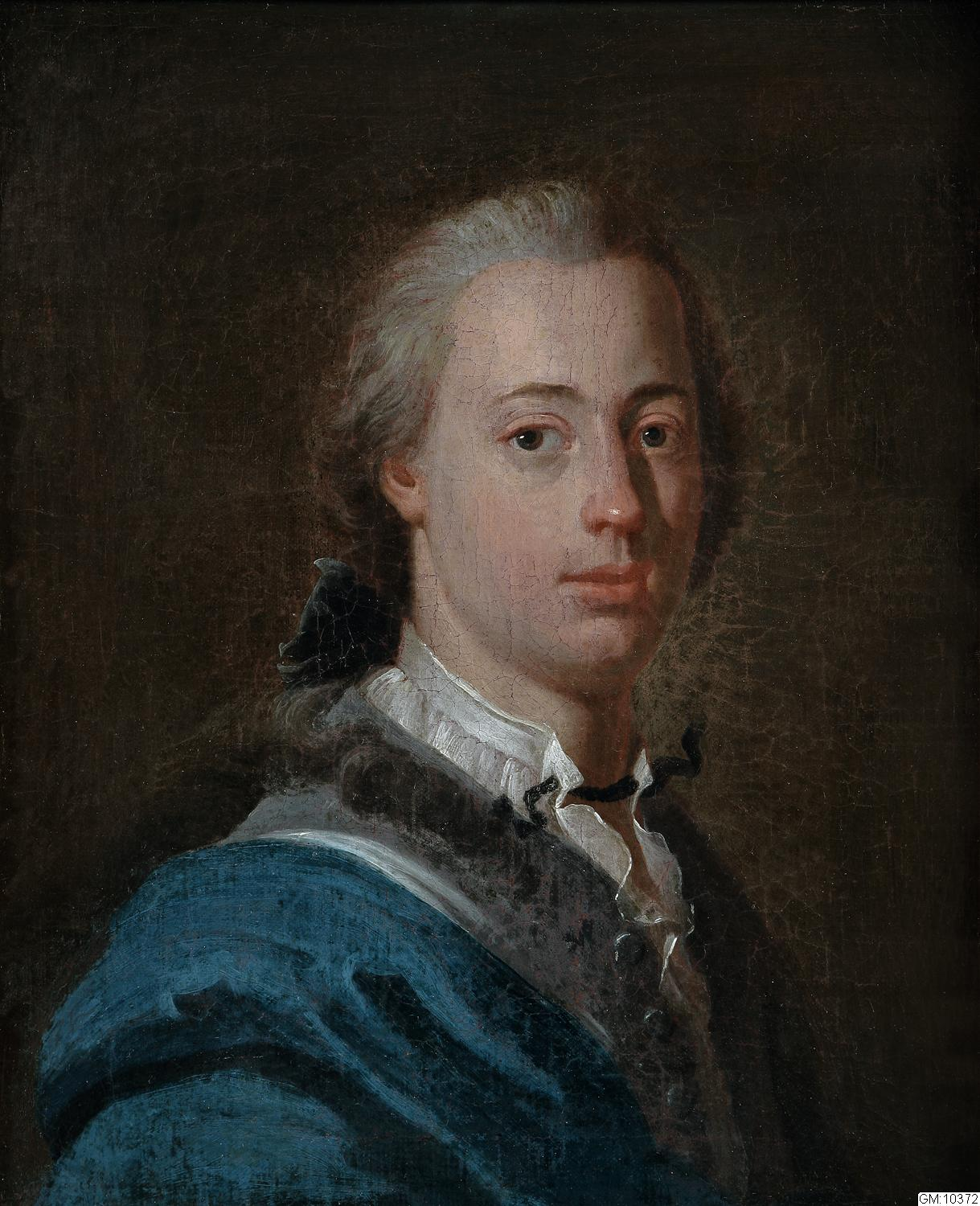
Johan Ross den äldre self portrait in oil, ca 1730

Johan Ross the Elder (Johan Ross den äldre) (1695 – March 26, 1773) was a Swedish church painter.

== Early life ==
Ross was born at the village of Meldorff in Schleswig-Holstein. He was the son of Johan Ross and Anna Stockhouf. His father was a painter and taught him the trade. He was first mentioned in 1721 when he listed as a journeyman in Götheborgs Arts and Painters - Embete. It also documents that he was a journeyman in his office in Hamburg. After his request for membership in the Gothenburg guild was refused, he traveled to Stockholm to continue his painting in 1730.

== Career ==
Ross had several assignments in the Gothenburg region during the 1730s, and in 1730 he was doing extensive material rings and decorative works of Lundby main church (Stora Lundby kyrka). The church belongs to the Stora Lundby parish in the Diocese of Gothenburg and is situated on the outskirts of Gråbo in Lerum Municipality, Västra Götaland County, Sweden.

In 1732, he appeared in Askim, and Örgryte in 1736 he painted window frames and barge boards. The colleagues in Gothenburg saw his independent intrusion into town with anxiety and irritability, and in 1737 invited Ross to join the ministry under the regulations of the guilds. He was named a "Painter in Gothenburg" on July 9, 1737, by resolution of the Royal Majesty and Reich Höglofl Commerce Collegium, and was alderman in the Gothenburg painters guild from 1744 to 1767, after which he took leave.

== Personal life ==
Ross married Helena Sibuelen in June 1751. His son Johan Ross the Younger (1723-1767) became a master painter in Gothenburg. He was also the father of church painter Maria Ross Carowsky (1723-1793) who in 1744 married the church painter Michael Carowsky (1707-1745). His granddaughter Christina Elisabeth Carowsky (1745-1797) was a Swedish artist. He was also the brother of Ditloff Ross (1706-1764), a church painter in Borås.

== Works ==
A number of works by Ross have been lost including church paintings at Landvetter (1732), Askim (1734), Partille (1753) and Backa (1759). Preserved art included altarpieces at the Church of Östad (Östads kyrka) and Öjared chapel (Öjareds kapell) both dating from 1729. The ceiling paintings in Örgryte old church (Örgryte gamla kyrka) likely made around 1740 by Ross and his son-in-law journeyman Michael Carowsky, who assisted in the painting of the church. The church belonging to the Örgryte parish in the Diocese of Gothenburg and is situated in the district of Bö in Gothenburg Municipality.

Michael Carowsky became master painter in Gothenburg in 1742. Ross, however, was the one who was asked to perform "painting throughout himlingen, bleachers and seats" for 400 daler silver. The ceiling in the medieval Säve Church (Säve kyrka) was covered with twelve large rectangular paintings, where the six eastern painted for the church extension in 1737 were probably by John Ross. The church is located on Hisingen island and belongs to the parish of Tuve-Säve. A bust in the Museum of Gothenburg is believed to be a self-portrait of Ross.

== Collection ==
Ross was also an art collector. His estate inventory from 1749 was about 100 paintings and a collection of 700 prints, with names such as Peter Paul Rubens and Rembrandt occur. Many of the fabrics were probably Ross' own works, but most appear to have been acquired through purchase, exchange or inheritance. The collection allowed Ross excellent opportunities to study various designs, compositions, techniques and color selection.

== Other sources ==
- Mellgren, Maria (2009) Kyrkor i Göteborgs stift : rapport över kyrkobyggnadsinventering och karakterisering 2001-2007 (Göteborgs stifts skriftserie) ISBN 9197431680
- Fredlund, Björn; Lena Boëthius (2002) Konstens Göteborg : nedslag i fyra sekel (Gothenburg Art Museum: Gothenburg) ISBN 91-87968-53-3, p. 20
- Horman, Ernst (1915) Örgryte gamla kyrka : bidrag till hennes historia (Erlander publishers: Gothenburg)
- Berg, Wilhelm (1882) Samlingar till Göteborgs historia (F. & G. Beijer publishers. Stockholm)
- Fernlund, Siegrun (1983) Götheborgs stadz art and painter-embete 99-0345976-9; 3 (Signum: Lund) ISBN 91-85330-52-3

== Related reading ==
- Persson, Folke; Agne Rundqvist (1953) Antologia Gothoburgensis (Rundqvists Boktryckeri: Gothenburg)
