= Marrinan =

Marrinan is a surname. Notable people with the surname include:

- Corinne Marrinan (born 1974), American producer and screenwriter
- Padraig Marrinan (1906–1973), Irish painter
