= 1836 in art =

Events from the year 1836 in art.

== Events ==
- 2 May – The Royal Academy Exhibition of 1836 opens at Somerset House in London, the last time the event is held at the venue
- June – Hablot K. Browne ("Phiz") begins illustrating The Pickwick Papers following the suicide of the original illustrator, Robert Seymour.
- David Wilkie is granted a knighthood.
- The Salon of 1836 takes place at the Louvre in Paris. A number of battle paintings destined for the Galerie des Batailles at the Palace of Versailles are exhibited.

== Works ==
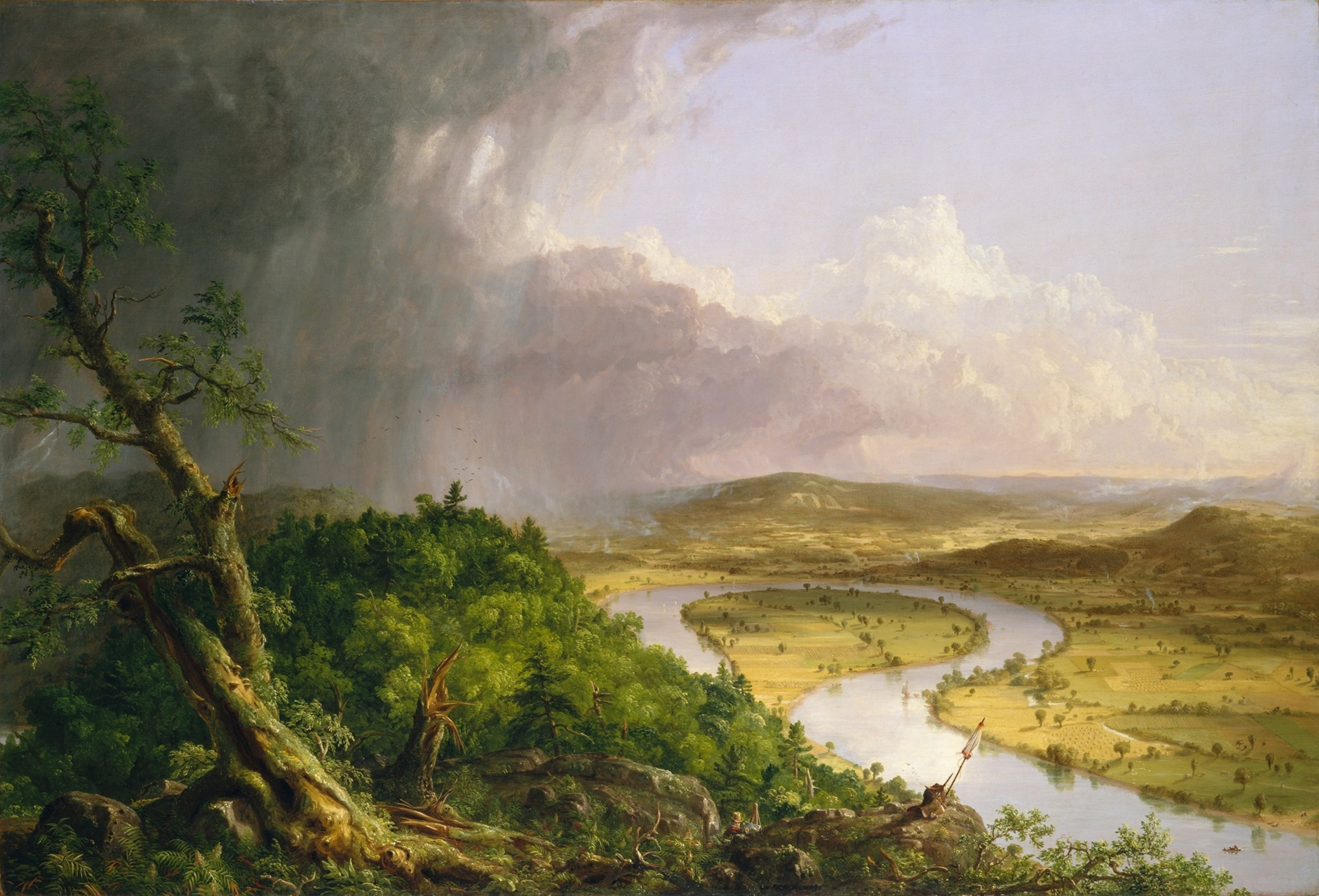
Thomas Cole – The Oxbow

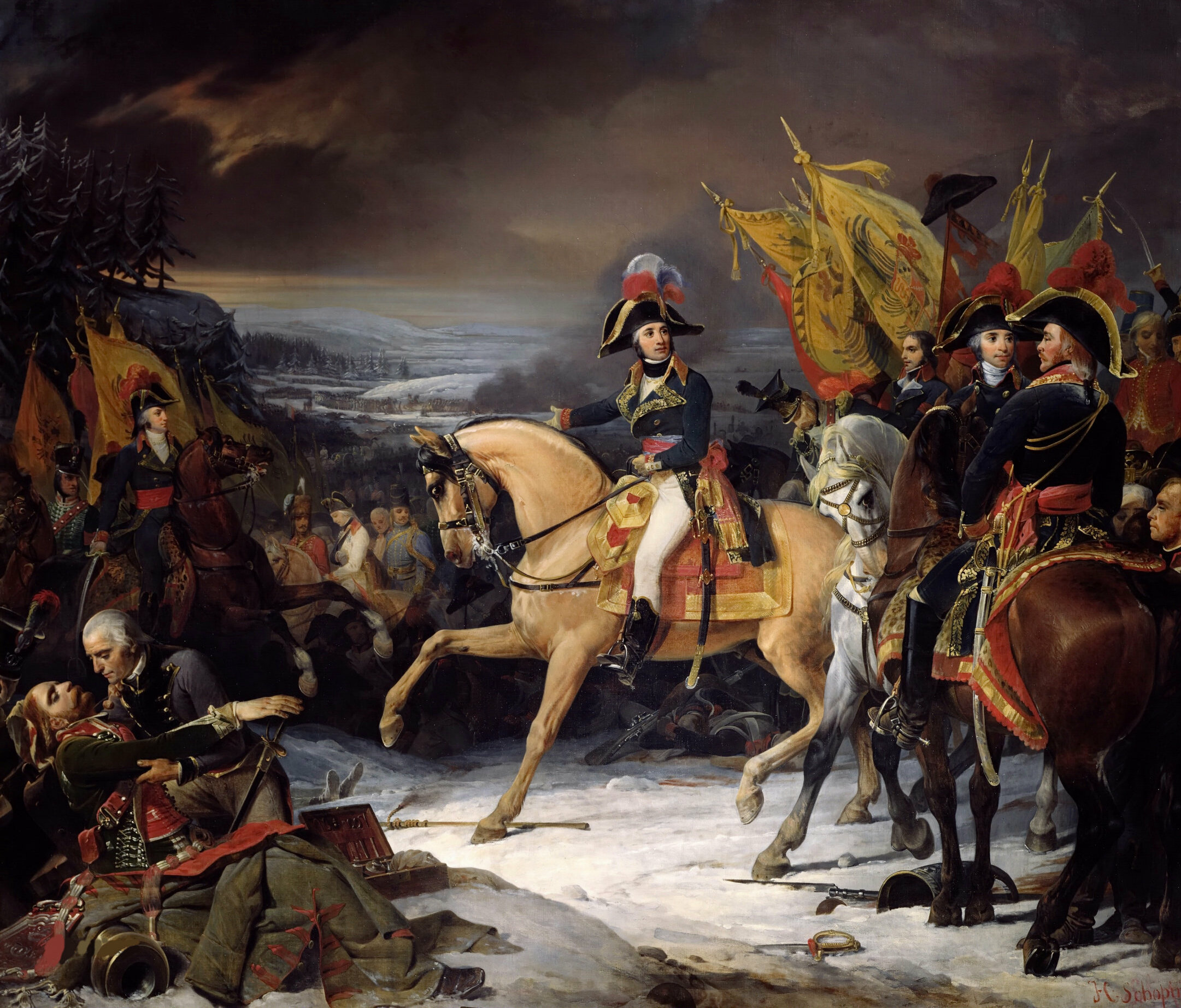
The Battle of Hohenlinden by Henri Frédéric Schopin

- Martin Archer Shee
  - Portrait of the Marquess of Anglesey
  - Portrait of Queen Adelaide
- Joseph Beaume – Napoleon's Departure from Elba
- Margaret Sarah Carpenter – Portrait of Ada Lovelace
- Nicolas-Toussaint Charlet – An Episode from the Russian Campaign
- Thomas Cole – The Oxbow
- John Constable
  - Cenotaph to the Memory of Sir Joshua Reynolds
  - Hampstead Heath with a Rainbow
  - Stoke-by-Nayland
- Edward William Cooke – Portsmouth Harbour
- Jean-Baptiste-Camille Corot – Diana and Actaeon
- Auguste Couder – The Battle of Lauffeld
- Joseph-Désiré Court – The King Distributing Battalion Standards to the National Guard
- Paul Delaroche
  - Charles I Insulted by Cromwell's Soldiers
  - Saint Cecilia and the Angels
- Jean-Hippolyte Flandrin – Study (Young Male Nude Seated beside the Sea)
- Caspar David Friedrich – Seashore by Moonlight
- Eduard Gaertner – The Family of Mr. Westfal in the Conservatory
- François Gérard – The Reading of the Declaration of the Deputies
- Nicolas Gosse – Louis Philippe Declining the Crown of Belgium Offered to His Son
- Christian Albrecht Jensen – Hans Christian Andersen
- Charles Landseer
  - Maria
  - The Plundering of Basing House
- Edwin Landseer – Pen, Brush and Chisel
- Charles-Philippe Larivière – The Arrival of the Duke of Orleans at the Hôtel de Ville
- Charles Robert Leslie – Autolycus
- Daniel Maclise – An Interview Between Charles I and Oliver Cromwell
- Richard Redgrave – The Thames from Millbank
- David Roberts – St Paul's Cathedral with the Lord Mayor's Procession
- Camille Roqueplan – The Lion in Love
- Henri Frédéric Schopin – The Battle of Hohenlinden
- Rolinda Sharples – The Clifton Racecourse
- Clarkson Stanfield
  - The Canal of the Guidecca, and the Church of the Gesuati, Venice
  - The Battle of Trafalgar
- Joseph von Führich – Jacob encountering Rachel with her father's herd
- Horace Vernet
  - The Battle of Jena
  - The Battle of Wagram
  - The Lion Hunt
  - The Slave Market
- Antoine Wiertz – The Greeks and the Trojans Fighting over the Body of Patroclus
- David Wilkie
  - Napoleon and Pius VII at Fontainebleau
  - The Duke of Wellington Writing Dispatches
  - The Peep-o'-Day Boys' Cabin
- Matthew Cotes Wyatt – Bronze equestrian statue of George III

== Births ==
- January 8 – Lawrence Alma-Tadema, Dutch-English painter (died 1912)
- January 13 – Giuseppe Abbati, Italian painter of the Macchiaioli (died 1868)
- January 14 – Henri Fantin-Latour, French painter and lithographer (died 1904)
- February 24 – Winslow Homer, American landscape painter (died 1910)+
- March 28 – Emmanuel Benner, French Academic painter (died 1896) and his twin Jean Benner, French painter (died 1906)
- April 27 – Eugen Felix, Austrian portrait painter (died 1906)
- May 25 – Lina von Perbandt, German landscape painter (died 1884)
- September 6 – Atkinson Grimshaw, English painter noted for nocturnal townscapes (died 1893)
- October 15 – James Tissot, French painter (died 1902)
- December 13 – Franz von Lenbach, German portrait painter (died 1904)

== Deaths ==
- January 7 – Thomas Henry, French painter and art patron (born 1766)
- January 16 – Heinrich Christoph Kolbe, German portrait painter (born 1771)
- January 24 - Francesco Alberi, Italian painter of historical scenes and frescoes (born 1765)
- February 23 – Ezra Ames, American portrait painter (born 1768)
- March 4 – Matthias Kessels, Dutch sculptor (born 1784)
- April 20 – Robert Seymour, English illustrator (born 1798)
- April 24 – Firmin Didot, French printer, engraver, and type founder (born 1764)
- before April 30 – Louise-Adéone Drölling, French painter and draughtswoman (born 1797)
- October 11 – Giacomo Raffaelli, Italian mosaicist from Rome (born 1753)
- October 17 – Orest Kiprensky, Russian portrait painter (born 1782)
- November 10 – William Frederick Wells, English watercolour painter and etcher (born 1762)
- date unknown
  - Pierre-Charles Bridan, French sculptor (born 1766)
  - Giovanni Folo, Italian engraver (born 1764)
  - Edme-François-Étienne Gois, French sculptor (born 1765)
  - Stefano Ticozzi, Italian art historian (born 1762)
