= Louis Marin =

Louis Marin may refer to:

- Louis Marin (philosopher) (1931–92), French philosopher
- Louis Marin (politician) (1871–1960), French politician
- Louis Stanislas Marin-Lavigne (1797–1860), French painter and lithographer.
