= Åke Mangård =

Swedish Air Force officer (1917–1998)

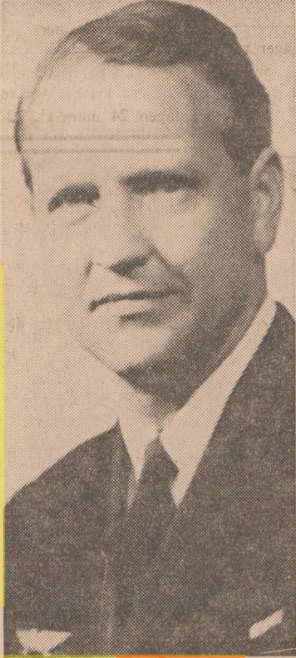
- Born: 21 January 1917; Västerås, Sweden
- Died: 24 March 1998 (aged 81); Madrid, Spain
- Military career
- Allegiance: Sweden
- Branch: Swedish Air Force
- Service years: 1939–1966
- Rank: Major General
- Commands: Royal Swedish Air Force College; Göta Wing; Vice Chief of the Defence Staff; Operations Command II, Defence Staff; Fourth Air Group

Major General Åke Mangård (21 January 1917 – 24 March 1998) was a Swedish Air Force officer. His senior commands include commanding officer of the Göta Wing (F 9) from 1959 to 1960, Vice Chief of the Defence Staff from 1960 to 1961 and commanding officer of the Fourth Air Group from 1964 to 1966. After retiring from the military in 1966, Mangård worked for North American Aviation in Los Angeles and for SKF in Gothenburg, Tokyo and Madrid. He settled in Madrid where he lived until his death in 1998.

== Early life ==
Mangård was born on 21 January 1917 in Västerås, Sweden, the son of Carl Mangård, an editor, and his wife Märtha (née Isaacsson). His brother was the judge Nils Mangård who late became chairman of the National Board for Consumer Complaints. He passed studentexamen in Västerås in 1936 and started his flight training at the Swedish Air Force Flying School in Ljungbyhed where he graduated at the top of his class as a fighter pilot.

== Career ==
Mangård was commissioned into the Swedish Air Force as a second lieutenant in 1939. He did not leave Ljungbyhed but stayed another couple of years and trained to become a flight instructor. Mangård was promoted to lieutenant in 1941 and to captain in 1946 after passing the General Course at the Royal Swedish Air Force Staff College. He then passed the Staff Course from 1946 to 1947.

Mangård was promoted to major in 1951 and served as commanding officer in the Operations Command of the Air Staff from 1953 to 1956. He was promoted to lieutenant colonel in 1955 and served as commanding officer of the Royal Swedish Air Force College (Flygkadettskolan) from 1956 to 1959 when he was promoted to colonel and appointed commanding officer of the Göta Wing (F 9) at Säve airbase near Gothenburg. One year later, in 1960, Mangård attended the Swedish National Defence College and was then appointed Vice Chief of the Defence Staff, a position he held for one year before being appointed commanding officer of OpL II (War Planning) section of the Defence Staff' Operations Command in 1961. In 1964, Mangård was appointed commanding officer of the Fourth Air Group (Fjärde flygeskadern, E 4) in Luleå and in 1965 he was promoted to major general. He left the military in 1966.

After retiring from the military, Mangård was appointed Corporate Director of International Programs of North American Aviation (later North American Rockwell Corporation) in Los Angeles in 1961, in charge of international marketing of North American projects. In 1970, Mangård started working for SKF in Gothenburg. He then worked for SKF in Tokyo from 1971 to 1974 and in Madrid from 1974 to 1985 when he retired. Mangård then continued working for Empresa Nacional de Electronica y Sistemas SA (INISEL) in Madrid from 1985 to 1988.

== Personal life ==
Mangård was married 1939-1967 to Anna-Lisa Hedberg (born 1918), the daughter of ryttmästare Axel Hedberg and his wife Lisa (née Zickermann). He was the father of Kerstin (born 1942), Gunilla (born 1943) and Carl-Axel (born 1946). In 1968 he married Rosemary Menzies-Whigham (born 1929), the daughter of William Menzies-Whigham and Honoria (née Bewicke).

== Dates of rank ==
- 1939 – Second lieutenant
- 1941 – Lieutenant
- 1946 – Captain
- 1951 – Major
- 1955 – Lieutenant colonel
- 1959 – Colonel
- 1965 – Major general

== Awards and decorations ==
=== Swedish ===
- (Sweden) Commander of the Order of the Sword (6 June 1963)
- (Sweden) Knight of the Order of Vasa
- (Sweden) Stockholm Defense Committee's silver medal (Stockholms försvarskommittés silvermedalj)

=== Foreign ===
- (Portugal) Portuguese Order of Military Merit
- (France) French Air Force Aeronautical Badge
- (Turkey) Turkish Air Force Aeronautical Badge

== Honours ==
- Member of the Royal Swedish Academy of War Sciences (1959)

Military offices
Preceded by Wilhelm Wagner	Royal Swedish Air Force College; 1956–1959	Succeeded by Rolf Svartengren
Preceded by Arthur Åhmansson	Göta Wing (F 9); 1959–1960	Succeeded by Ulf Cappelen-Smith
Preceded by Sam Myhrman	Vice Chief of the Defence Staff; 1960–1961	Succeeded by Dag Arvas
Preceded by Oscar Krokstedt¹	Defence Staff's Operations Command II; 1961–1964	Succeeded by ?
Preceded by Gösta Odqvist	Fourth Air Group; 1964–1966	Succeeded by Nils Personne
Notes and references
1. Before 1961, Operations Command II was called Section II.
