= Säve Airport =

Airport in Gothenburg, Sweden

Säve Airport Säve flygplats
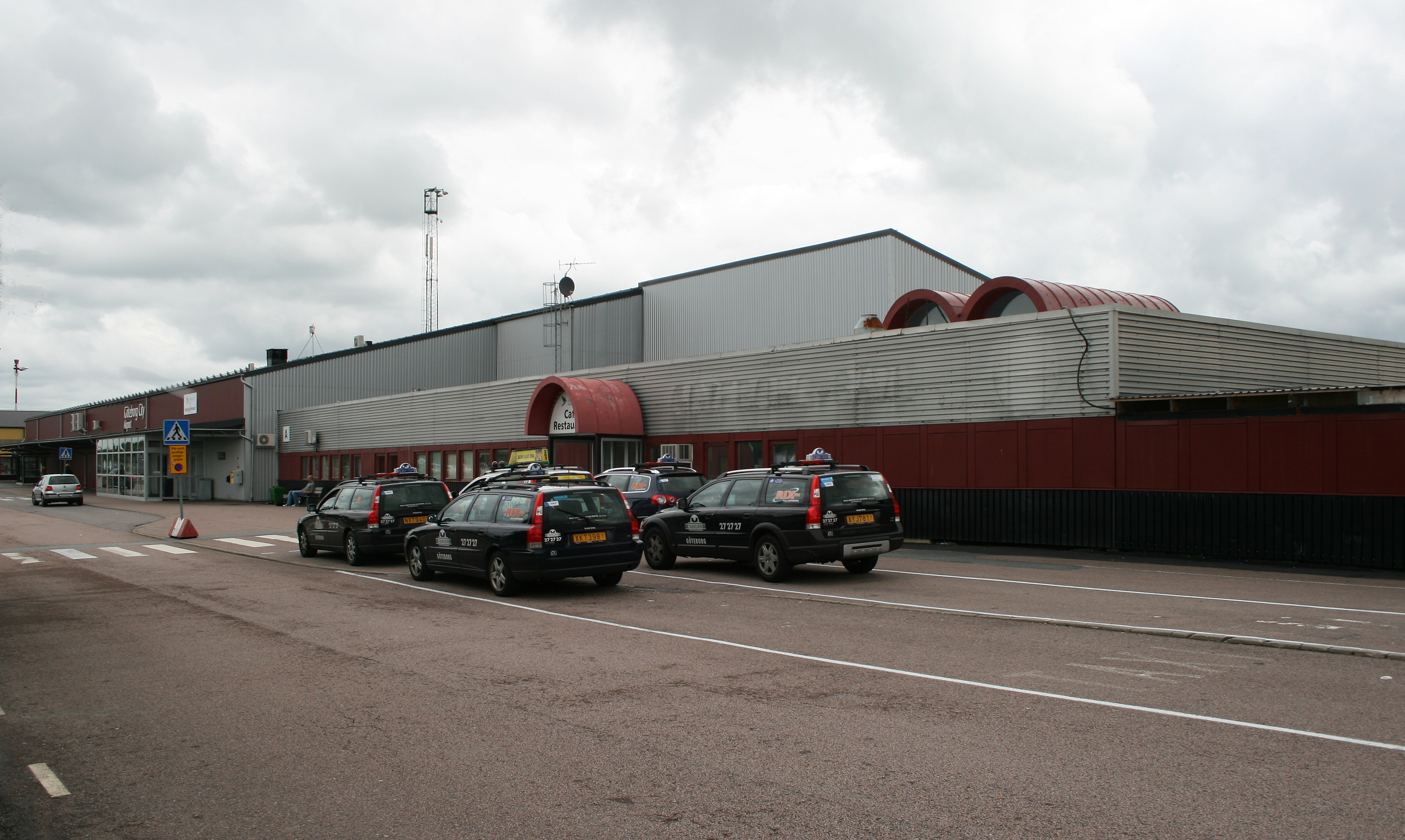
- IATA: GSE; ICAO: ESGP

Summary
- Airport type: Private
- Operator: Castellum
- Serves: Gothenburg
- Location: Säve, Hisingen, Bohuslän Sweden
- Passenger services ceased: 18 January 2015
- Elevation AMSL: 18 m (59 ft)
- Coordinates: 57°46′32″N 011°52′14″E
- Website: goteborgcityairport.se

Map
- Location of airport in Västra Götaland

Runways
Direction	Length		Surface
Direction	m	ft	Surface
01/19	2,039	6,868	Asphalt
~~04/22~~	~~871~~	~~2,934~~	~~Asphalt~~ (closed)

Statistics (2012)
- Passengers total: 807,763 ▲4.5 %
- Source: Swedish AIP at EUROCONTROL; Statistics: Swedish Transport Agency

Säve Airport (IATA: GSE, ICAO: ESGP), known as Göteborg City Airport until 2015, is an airport located 5 NM (9.3 km; 5.8 mi) northwest from the centre of Gothenburg, near Säve, on the island of Hisingen, Bohuslän, Sweden. It is located within the borders of Gothenburg Municipality, hence its former name. It was Gothenburg's second international airport, with international scheduled flights from 2001 to 2015. In addition to commercial airlines, the airport was also used by a number of rescue services, including the Swedish Coast Guard.

Owing to damage to the airport's runway by heavy aircraft and the high cost of repairs, the airport was closed to airline traffic indefinitely on 18 January 2015, but remained open to light aircraft until the end of 2025 when it closed down for all aircraft traffic.

== Overview ==
Although it was primarily a low-cost airline airport, it is actually located closer to Gothenburg city centre than the main Göteborg Landvetter Airport, even if the driving time is around the same. It was one of the few city airports to receive Ryanair flights in the 2000s. Göteborg City Airport was able to handle aircraft up to the size of a Boeing 737, an Airbus A320, or similar jets. The airport still accommodates general aviation activities, including two flying clubs, Aeroklubben i Göteborg and Chalmers flygklubb.

DFDS Seaways cited competition from low-cost air services, especially Ryanair (which flew to Glasgow Prestwick and London Stansted from Gothenburg City Airport), as being a reason for its scrapping its Newcastle-Gothenburg ferry service in October 2006. It was the only dedicated passenger ferry service between Sweden and the United Kingdom, and had been running since the 19th century (under various operators).

== History ==
=== Development ===
Construction of the airport began in 1940, as a military airbase for Göta Wing (F 9), a wing of the Swedish Air Force. The airbase was closed down in 1969. The old civil airport at Torslanda (about 10 km south of Säve) was closed down in 1977, and scheduled flights moved to Landvetter Airport which Säve was one of few locations as potential replacement for Torslanda before construction of Landvetter began; general aviation activities were moved to Säve. In 1984 the runway was improved and extended, to allow larger business jets to operate.

In 2001 the airport was renamed City Airport, and Ryanair started operating scheduled flights to London. Prior to the arrival of Ryanair in 2001, the airport had 9,000 passengers per year; 844,000 passengers flew from City Airport in 2008.

In 2004 the Swedish Armed Forces entirely left the airport, when a helicopter squadron of the Swedish Marines was disbanded. A legacy of the military presence is a museum called Aeroseum, preserving various fighter jets and displaying military aircraft history.

=== Closure for airline service ===
On 26 November 2014 the airport had to ban all heavier aircraft, such as the Boeing 737, because the taxiway was not rated to carry heavy aircraft. This meant that all flights operated by Ryanair, Wizz Air and Gotlandsflyg were diverted to Landvetter Airport. The lighter aircraft flown by Sparrow Aviation were allowed to fly after a ban of one day. In the early days following the ban, most passengers still cleared security at Gothenburg City Airport before being transferred by bus. Later all check-in was done at Landvetter Airport for diverted flights.

Initial plans were for the airport to remain closed to heavy aircraft until at least the end of January 2015. However, on 13 January 2015, the decision was published to close the airport permanently to passenger traffic, owing to the high cost of fixing the runway/taxiway problem. Sparrow Aviation, using lighter aircraft, continued to use City Airport until 18 January 2015.

The airport was kept open until the end of 2015 in the hope of attracting a possible buyer who could agree to Swedavia's conditions and ensure a long-term plan.

In May 2016, it was announced that a motorsport circuit would be built at the Säve Airport, intended to host Scandinavian Touring Car Championship races. Somehow this did not come to fruition so far (2021), while the airfield itself is not closed but still open for general aviation, home of two aeroclubs and a commercial flight school as well as police and ambulance helicopters.

In 2019, Heart Aerospace established a presence at the airport.

== Airlines and destinations ==
Owing to the aforementioned issues, there is no longer any passenger traffic scheduled. All airlines relocated to Göteborg Landvetter Airport, except Sparrow Aviation which terminated its Gothenburg-Stockholm Bromma Airport flights.

== Statistics ==
Passengers per year
Year	Passengers	Change
2010	714,798	▼1.9%
2011	772,669	▲8.1%
2012	807,763	▲4.6%
2013	863,140	▲6.8%
2014	757,693	▼12.2%
2015	2,121	▼99.7%

Aircraft movements per year
Year	Movements	Change
2010	53,650	▲4.5%
2011	55,394	▲3.3%
2012	48,968	▼11.6%
2013	50,848	▲3.8%
2014	50,822	▼0.1%
2015	14,679	▼ -71.1%
