= Diana and Callisto (Turner) =

Painting by J. M. W. Turner

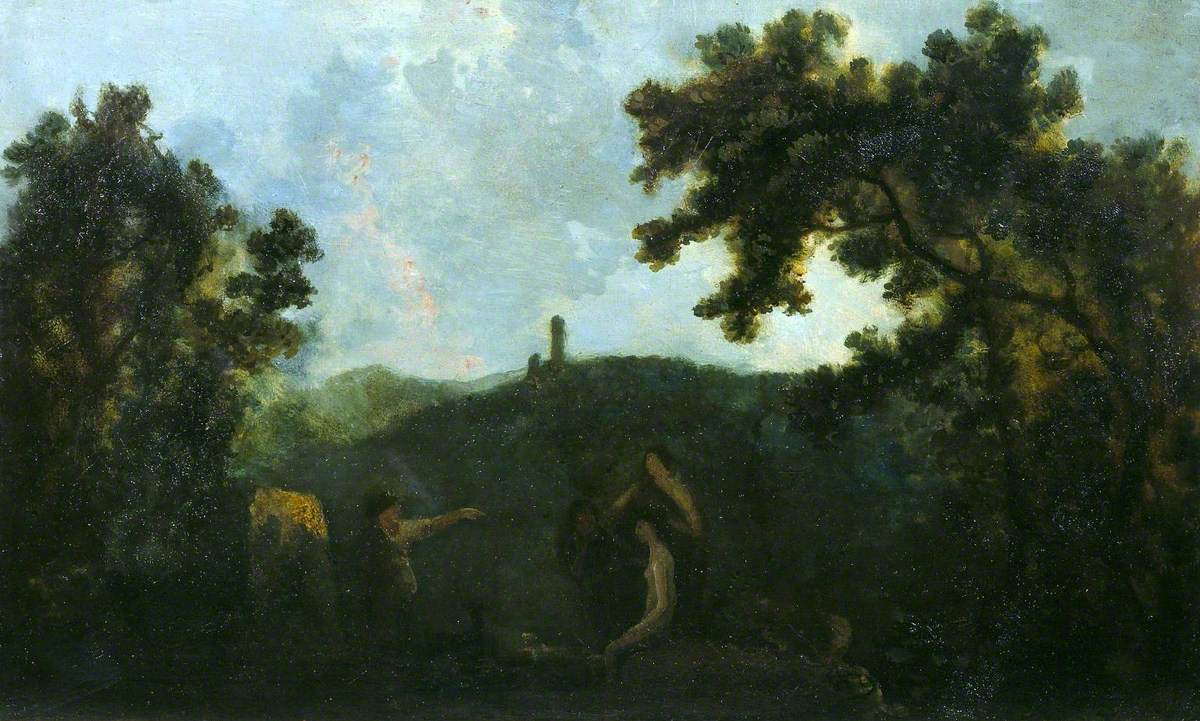
Diana and Callisto (c. 1796) by J. M. W. Turner

Diana and Callisto is an oil on canvas painting attributed to J. M. W. Turner, painted c. 1796. It is loosely based in an engraving of the 1765 painting Diana and Callisto by the Welsh artist Richard Wilson. It is held at the Tate Gallery, in London.

== See also ==
- List of paintings by J. M. W. Turner
