= Michael Carowsky =

Swedish church painter (1707–1745)

Michael Carowsky (1707–1745) was a Swedish church painter.

== Biography ==
Carowsky moved from Danzig to Gothenburg, Sweden where he became master at the Göteborgs Målareämbete (City of Gothenburg Art and Painters' Office) in 1742. In 1744, he married the artist Maria Carowsky (1723–1793). The couple had one daughter, Christina Elisabeth Carowsky (1745–1797), who became a notable portrait painter in Gothenburg.

His master works consisted of paintings in the Stora rådhussalen at the Gothenburg City Hall . Among other works are the figural paintings at Borgvik Church (Borgviks kyrka) from 1745 and, together with his father-in-law Johan Ross the Elder (1695–1773), he completed church ceiling paintings at Örgryte Old Church from 1741.

== Other sources ==
- Svenskt konstnärslexikon, part one (1), page: 289, (Allhems Förlag, Malmö)
