= Säve =

- Location within Västra Götaland Location within Sweden
- Coordinates: 57°48′N 11°55′E
- Country: Sweden
- Province: Bohuslän
- County: Västra Götaland County
- Municipality: Göteborg Municipality

Area
  - Total: 0.47 km^{2} (0.18 sq mi)

Population (31 December 2010)
  - Total: 743
  - Density: 1,597/km^{2} (4,140/sq mi)
- Time zone: UTC+1 (CET)
  - Summer (DST): UTC+2 (CEST)

Säve is a locality situated in Gothenburg Municipality, Västra Götaland County, Sweden. It had 743 inhabitants in 2010.

The origin of the name Säve is the Old Swedish word "sjöe" (Modern Swedish "sjö"), meaning "lake".

== See also ==
- F 9 Säve military airbase
  - Gothenburg City Airport
- Säve Church
- Tuve
