= Göta Wing =

Coordinates: 57°46′44″N 11°53′01″E

- Göta flygflottilj
- Active: 1940–1969
- Country: Sweden
- Allegiance: Swedish Armed Forces
- Branch: Swedish Air Force
- Type: Wing (1940–1957); Sector wing (1957–1969)
- Role: Fighter wing
- Part of: 2nd Air Command (1942–1966); Milo V (1966–1969)
- Garrison/HQ: Gothenburg/Säve
- Mascot: Vincere est vivere ("To conquer is to live")
- Anniversaries: 6 November (Note: The Lützen Day, in memory of Gustav II Adolf who was the founder of Gothenburg.)

Insignia
- Roundel

Aircraft flown
- Bomber: B 4, B 5, B 17
- Fighter: J 8, J 9, J 11, J 22, J 21, J 28, J 29, J 34
- Multirole helicopter: Hkp 3B
- Reconnaissance: S 14
- Trainer: Sk 11, Sk 12, Sk 14, Sk 15, Sk 16, Sk 25
- Transport: Tp 46, Tp 91
- G 101, Se 102, Se 103, Se 104

Göta Wing (Swedish: Göta flygflottilj), also F 9 Säve, or simply F 9, was a Swedish Air Force wing with the main base located near Gothenburg in south-west Sweden.

== History ==
The decision to set up the air wing was made in 1936 to defend the import/export harbours on the west coast. The wing itself was not commissioned until October 1, 1940 and the airfield took until 1941 to complete.

Initially, two squadrons of J 8 fighters were commissioned in 1940, but they were quickly replaced by three squadrons of J 11s.

In 1942 hangars and some of the base command were relocated inside large shelters blasted out of the rocks. Initially the shelter area was only 8,000 m^{2} (72,000 sq ft.) but it was later extended to 22,000 m^{2} (200,000 sq ft.) 30 m (100 ft) below ground level.

During 1943, the J 11s were replaced by J 22s and subsequently by J 21s in 1946. The J 21s served for only three years until 1949 when they were replaced by the J 28B.

After yet only two years the J 28Bs were in turn replaced by the J 29. The 29 Tunnan did serve for over ten years until they were finally replaced by the J 34 where some units came from Svea Wing (F 8) and Södertörn Wing (F 18).

The squadrons were gradually decommissioned one per year 1967-1969 until the wing itself was decommissioned on June 30, 1969.

The airfield later operated as Gothenburg City Airport. It was later closed to commercial traffic in 2015 due to damage to the runway caused by heavy aircraft, and presently serves as a general aviation airport under the name Säve Airport.

The old mountain hangars house the Aeroseum museum.

== Barracks and training areas ==
The wing was first based at F 7 and from 16 June 1941 on the Säve Airfield at Hisingen in the City of Gothenburg. The runway system comprised three runways and the wing had two underground hangars; one from 1944 and one from 1955.

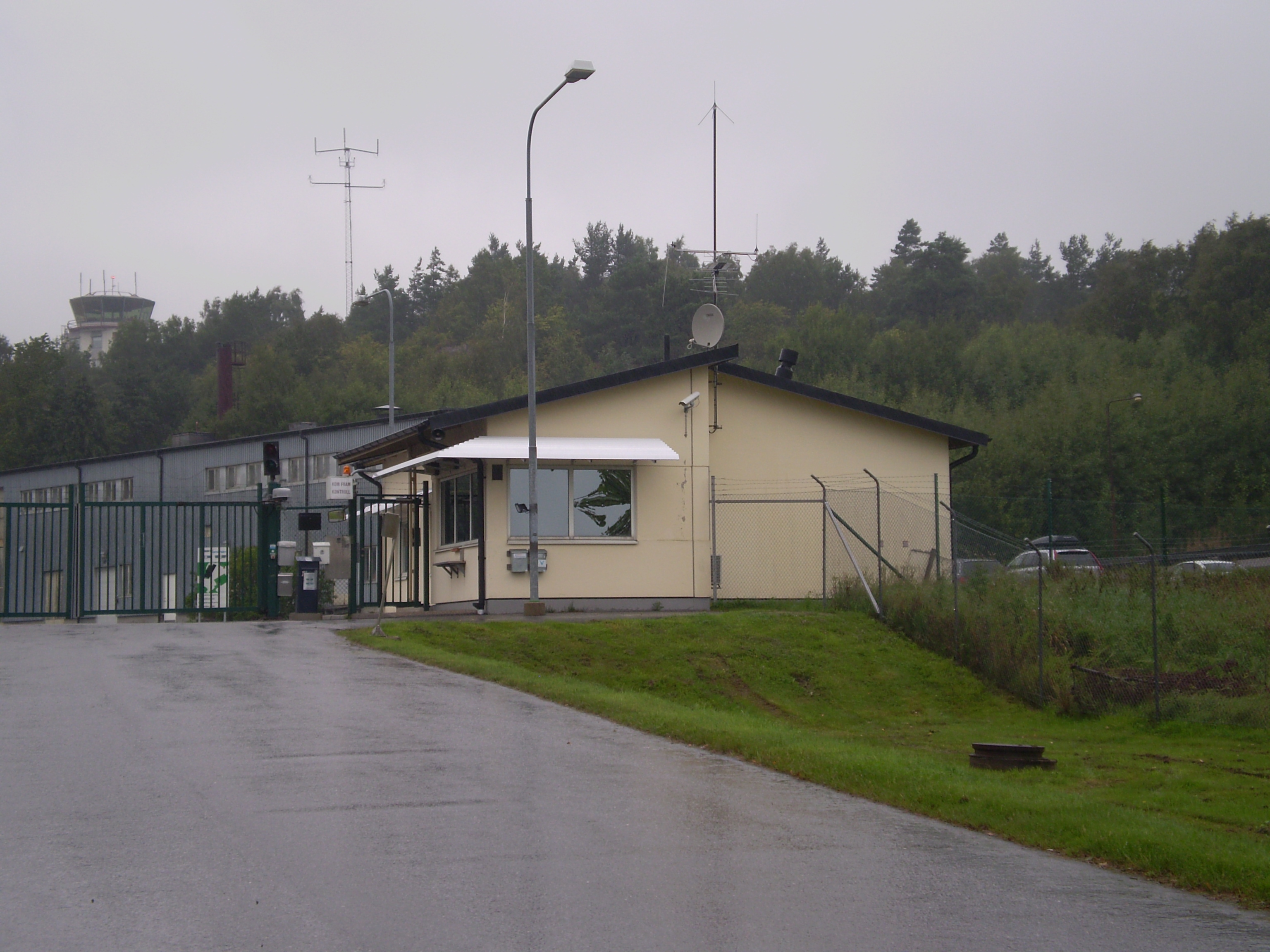
Guardhouse and control tower

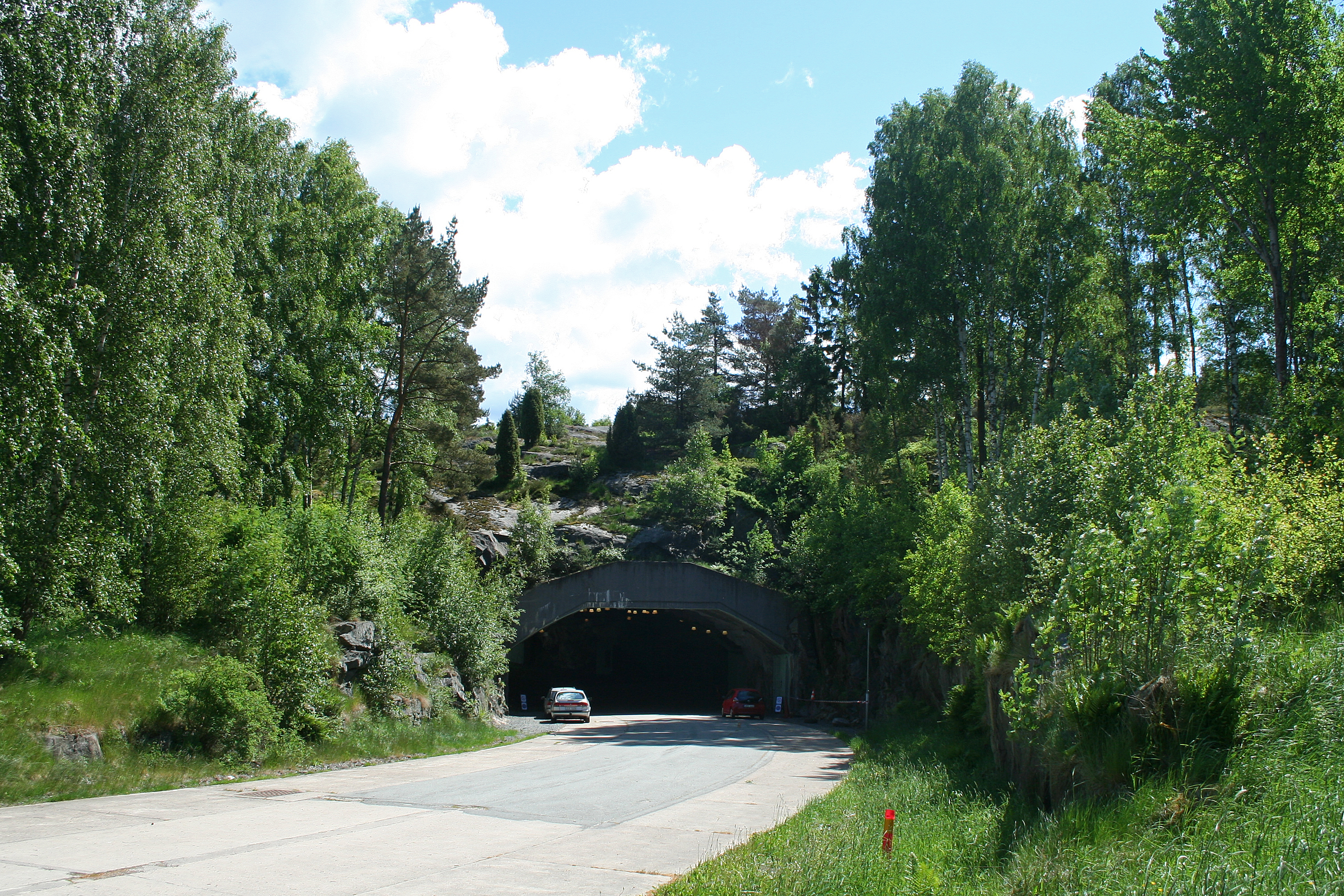
Entrance to the underground hangar

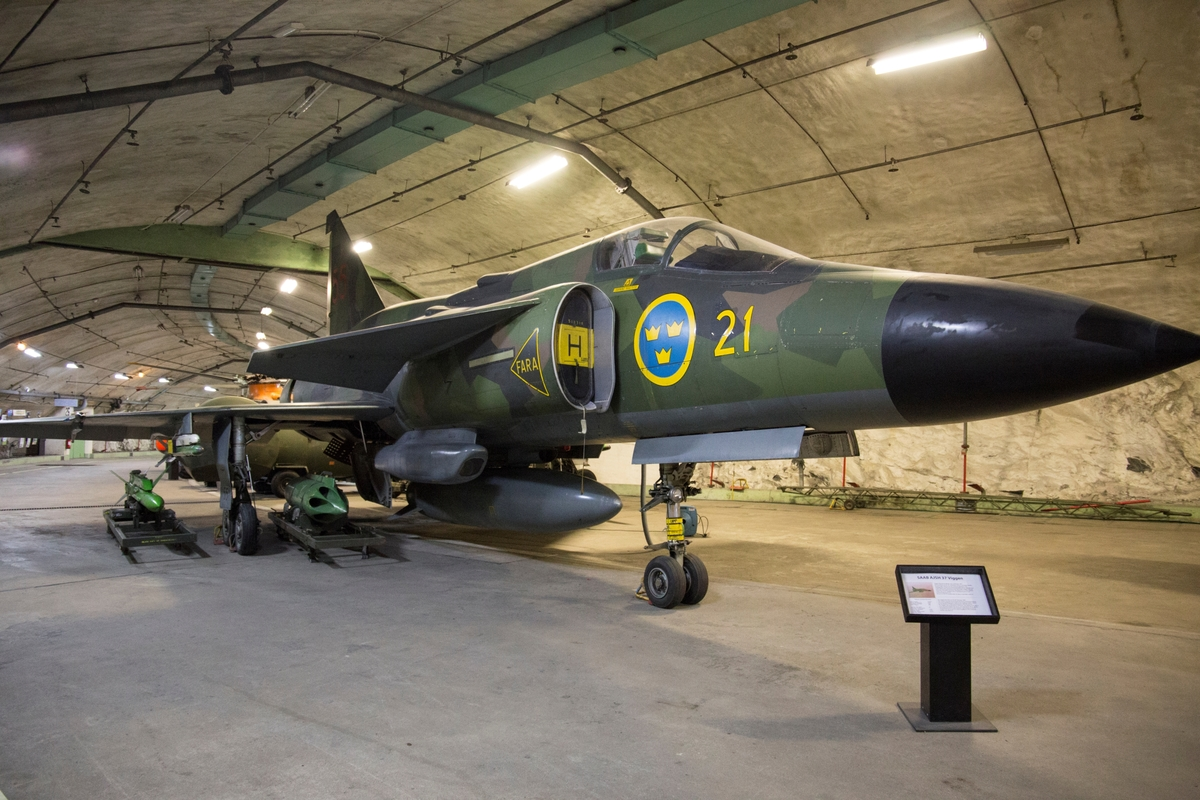
A Saab 37 Viggen in the underground hangar

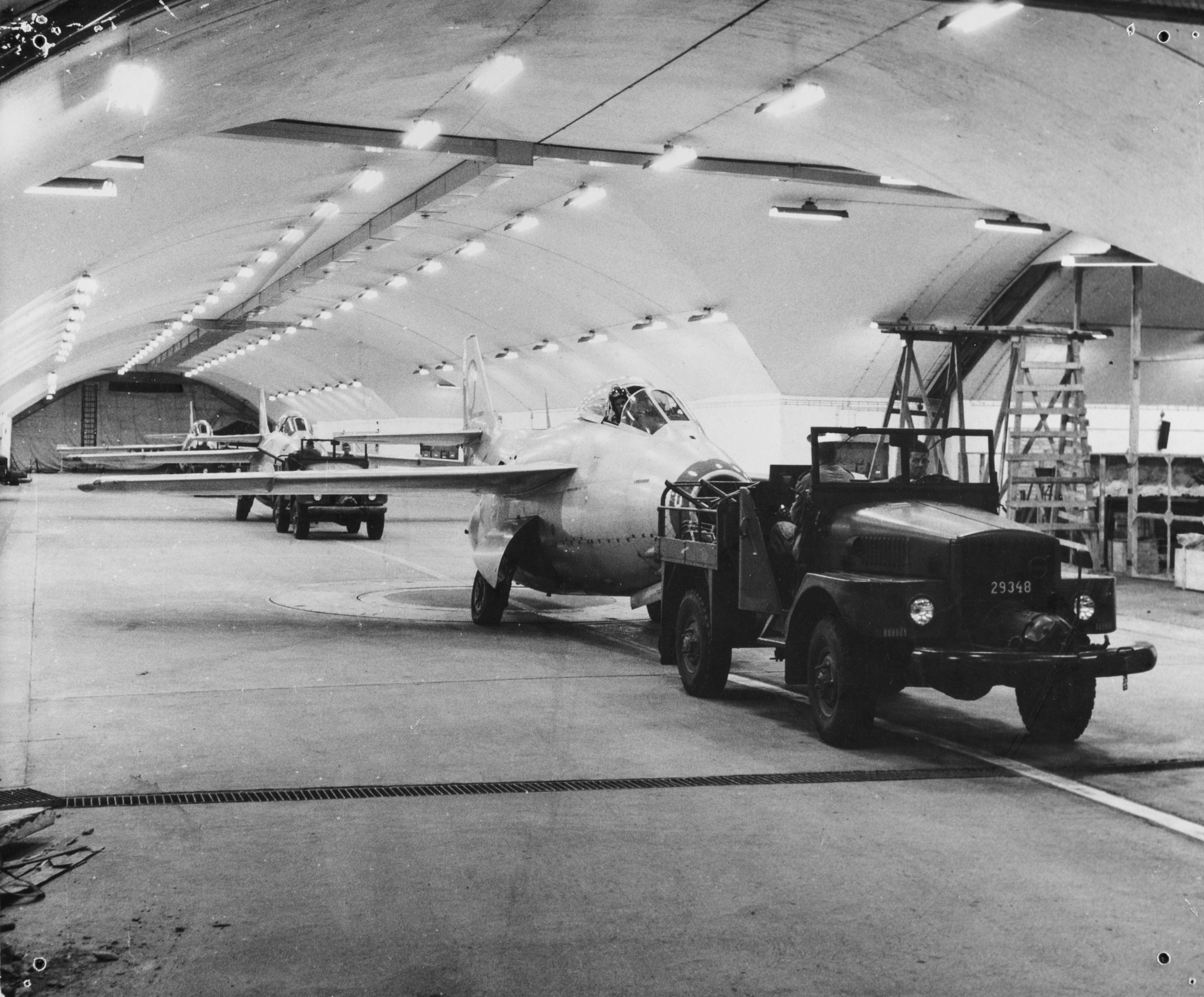
Saab 29 Tunnan in the underground hangar in the 1950s

== Heraldry and traditions ==
=== Coat of arms ===
Blazon: "The coat of arms of Gothenburg, azure, with waves argent six times divided bendy-sinister argent, charged with a double-tailed crowned lion rampant or, armed and langued gules".

=== Colours, standards and guidons ===
The colour of the wing was presented by His Royal Highness Crown Prince Gustaf Adolf at the Säve Airfield on 13 October 1941. Blazon: "On blue cloth in the centre the badge of the Air Force; a winged two-bladed propeller under a royal crown proper, all in yellow. In the first corner a rampant yellow lion with an open crown." Decor through inserting and embroidery.

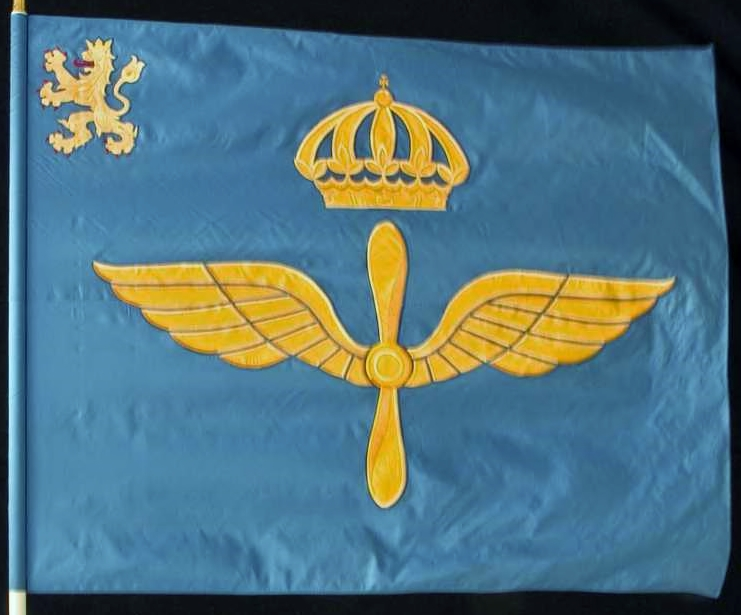
The 1939 colour.

== Commanding officers ==
Commanding officers from 1940 to 1969. The commanding officer was referred to as flottiljchef ("wing commander") and had the rank of colonel.

- 1940–1948: Magnus Bång
- 1948–1959: Arthur Åhmansson
- 1959–1960: Åke Mangård
- 1960–1969: Ulf Cappelen-Smith

== Names, designations and locations ==
Name	Translation	From		To
Kungl. Göta flygflottilj	Royal Göta Wing; Royal Göta Air Group	1940-07-01	–	1969-06-30
Designation		From		To
F 9		1940-07-01	–	1957-09-30
F 9/Se W2		1957-10-01	–	1969-06-30
Location		From		To
Säve Airbase		1940-07-01	–	1969-06-30

== See also ==
- Swedish Air Force
- List of military aircraft of Sweden
- Underground hangar
