= Johann Karl Auerbach =

Austrian painter

Karl Auerbach (1723 – c.1786) was an Austrian painter.

The son of Johann Gottfried Auerbach, he was born at Vienna, and became, under his father's instruction, a talented painter of portraits and history. The cathedral of St. Stephen in Vienna possesses an altar-piece and a ceilingpainting by him. At Hetzendorf and Innsbruck there are also examples of his art. Karl Auerbach died in Vienna in 1786 (or 1788).
