= Tivadar Alconiere =

Austro-Hungarian painter

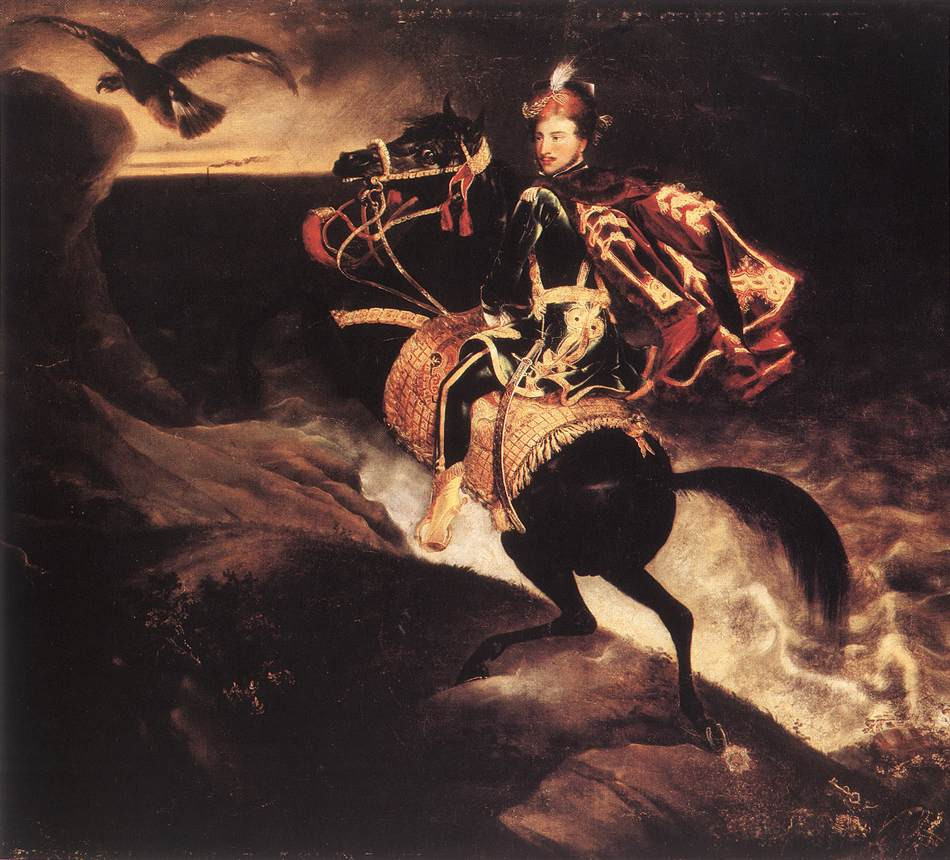
Allegoric Riding Portrait (1831 or 1837), Hungarian National Gallery

Tivadar Cohn Hermann Alconiere (Hungarian: Alconière Tivadar, 1797–1865) was a 19th-century painter from the Austrian Empire. Cohn-Hermann was his original family name.

== Early life ==
He came from a rich Jewish family in Nagymarton but quickly squandered his inheritance, after which he tried to make a living from painting.

He began studying art in Vienna in 1812. He continued his studies at the Vienna Academy between 1816 and 1820, where he also met the painters of the Nazarene group. Under their influence, he converted to Catholicism in order to pursue a career in art and adopted the surname Alconiere. Nevertheless, he never denied his Jewishness.

== Career ==
In the 1830s, he fulfilled various orders in Rome together with the Nazarenes, and at the same time, in 1840, he did not fail to present himself at the first exhibition of the newly established Pesti Art Society. At that time, he only left the territory of Italy for short periods, as he was progressing well in his career as the court portrait painter of Prince Louis of Parma. The domestic recognition did not fail either; Ferenc Kazinczy, after visiting him in his studio, remarked, "Our more famous people would paint themselves by him."

Alconiere's oeuvre is still waiting to be processed—many of his works are hidden or cannot be located, which is partly because of his wanderings. Various names have come up as a representation of his best-known painting preserved in the Hungarian National Gallery: the figure perched on the rocks, sitting on a black stilt, was once thought to be István Széchenyi, and the environment—with the rippling waves of the river, and the steamboat looming in the distance—could suggest this, but at the same time, his facial features are undoubtedly different from Széchenyi's. It has been identified several times as a portrait of László Károlyi, but this can be ruled out based on biographical data and existing portraits.

On the other hand, there is a count Károlyi with whom the protagonist of Alconiere's equestrian picture can actually be identified, and this is György Károlyi (1802–1877), a good friend of István Széchenyi, a companion in his travels, one of the founders of the Hungarian Academy of Sciences, and one of the most significant figures of Hungarian public life and politics in the 19th century.

Alconiere presented two pictures at the first exhibition of the Pest Society in 1840. The list of oil paintings exhibited in the first room included two works by Alconiere: Napoleon on horseback and a picture of a horse (the latter presumably as a study for the former). Although the paintings are not known to be extant, it is no coincidence that Alconiere appeared in this epoch-making, important presentation of Hungarian art life with a picture of a horse, even one whose model could have been Jacques-Louis David's iconic series with a similar theme. The painting Napoleon Crosses the Alps was completed between 1801 and 1806 in five versions. The first one, a year after the event, was made by the Spanish ruler IV. Károly ordered it from the artist. The figure, costume, and environment of Károlyi Alconiere's equestrian portrait, are similar to Napoleon galloping on a prancing horse in a cloak fluttering among the rocks of the Alps. It is not known when this picture was created – 1831, 1835 and 1837 also appear as the time of its creation – it is assumed that the painting presented at the Art Society exhibition is later, if not by much, but in any case the subject had been preoccupying the painter for years.

== Personal life ==
Alconiere's private life was not without problems: "...for years he loved a Hungarian lady, whom he often painted... but he did not win her hand; he finally married someone else, but his wife went crazy, and he fell into a depression because of this; he began to deteriorate..." During this time, the Neueste Nachrichten issue of October 10, 1863, reported that Alconiere had forged banknotes and was sent to prison. The painter already noted in a letter that the paper did not report that he was released after 21 days, his innocence having been proven.

Alconiere relocated frequently, after Italy, in the territory of the Habsburg Empire, sometimes in Hungary, sometimes in Vienna, where he enjoyed the friendship and company of the best painters of the period, Josef Danhauser and Friedrich von Amerling, who painted him. In the period between the two world wars, the Wolf Museum in Kismarton exhibited a small picture of her from her apartment there, Múlt és Jövő (Past and Future) published a portrait of Miksáné Sauer in 1939. According to Csatkai, he supported himself after his wife's death by creating stone drawings with unusual themes and solutions, reminiscent of the Arcimboldo images of Mannerism. His last years are described in a letter written to Mihály Mayr, a painter friend from Nagymarton, which is now kept by the Sopron Museum, together with his portrait.
