= Maria Cattarina Locatelli =

Italian artist (died 1723)

Maria Cattarina Locatelli (or Lucatelli; died 1723) was an Italian painter. A native of Bologna, she was a pupil of Ludovico Pasinelli. She painted a St. Anthony and St. Theresa for the church of the Madonna di San Columbano. She died in 1723.
