= The Fruit =

Sculpture by Antoine Bourdelle

Coordinates: 48.8431°N 2.3187°E

The Fruit, sculpted in 1906, is the work of Antoine Bourdelle. The statue is an anatomical study of a nude female who stands confidently, with fruit cupped in her right hand, her left arm bent behind and her ankles crossed.

== Gallery ==
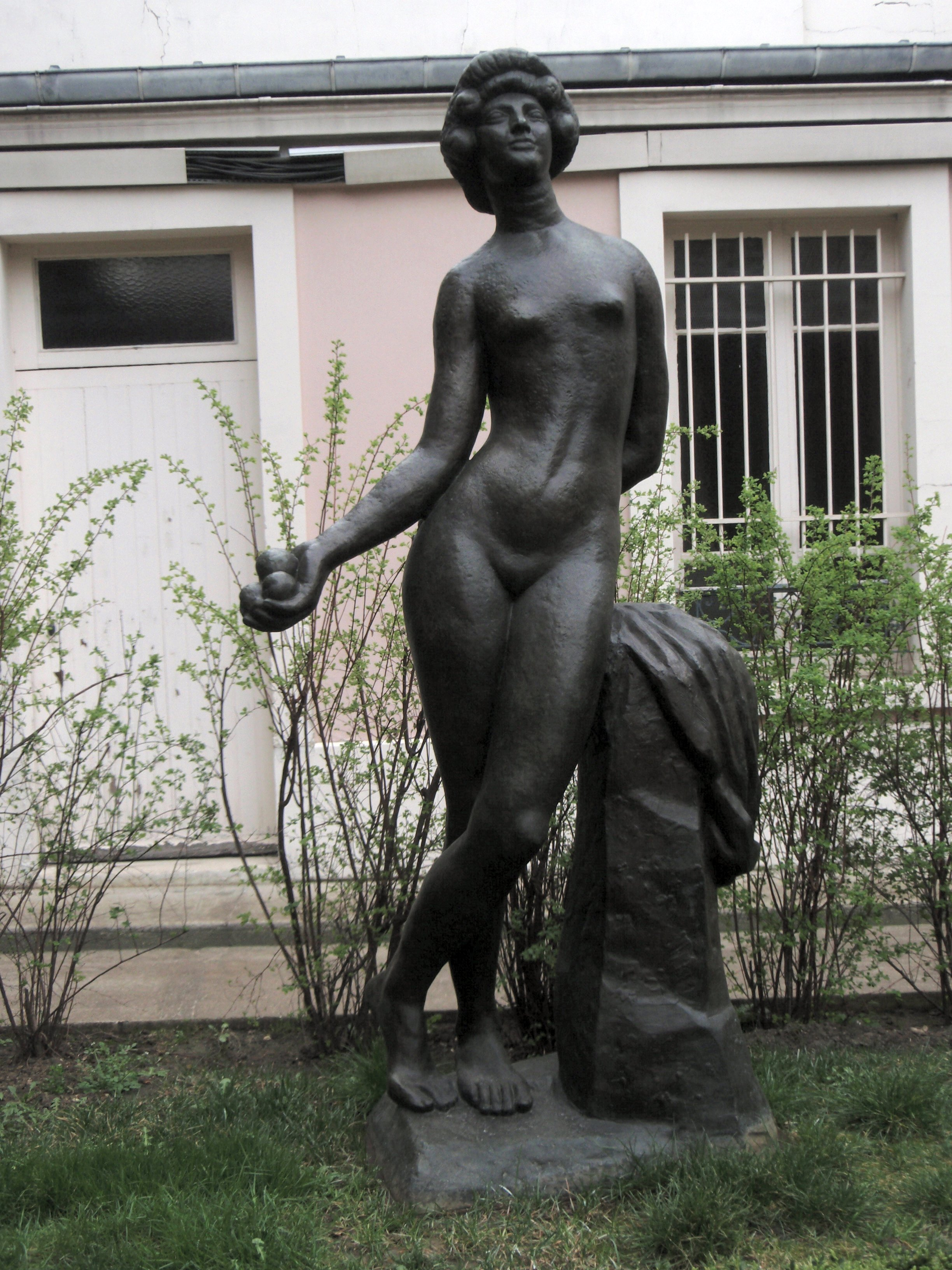
The Fruit, in the Musée Bourdelle

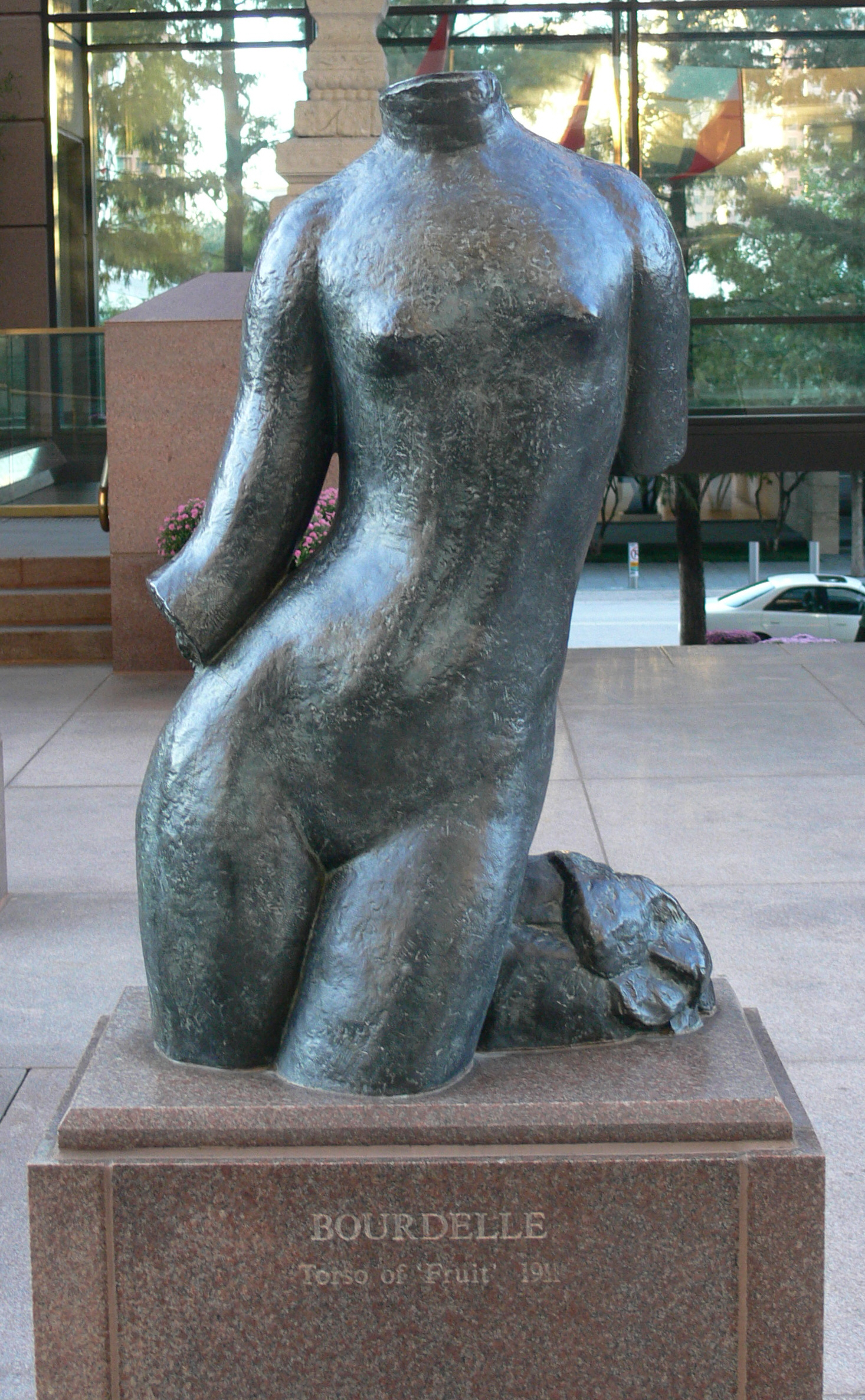
Torso of Fruit, 1911, Trammell Crow Center, Dallas, Texas

== See also ==
- List of works by Antoine Bourdelle
