= Christina Elisabeth Carowsky =

Swedish artist (1745–1797)

Christina Elisabeth Carowsky (March 5, 1745 – 1797) was a Swedish painter.

== Biography ==
Carowsky was born in Gothenburg into a family of artists. Her mother was Maria Carowsky and Michael Carowsky, and her grandfather was Johan Ross the Elder. Carowsky became a well known portrait painter in Gothenburg. She married in 1787 to Engelbert Jörlin, the principal at Gothenburg elementary school.

== Other Sources ==
- Collections at Gothenburg history [III]: Christine Church books for marriages, births and deaths, Wilhelm Berg, Stockholm 1890–1893, p 694
- Svenskt konstnärslexikon (Swedish Art dictionary) Allhems Förlag, Malmö (1952) (in Swedish)
