= Maria Carowsky =

Swedish artist (1723–1793)

- Born: Maria Ross; 1723; Gothenburg, Sweden
- Died: 1793 (aged 69–70)
- Spouse: Michael Carowsky (m. 1744)

Maria Carowsky (née Ross; 1723–1793) was a Swedish artist.

Maria Carowsky was born in Gothenburg to the artist Johan Ross the Elder, an emigrant from Holstein. In 1744, she married the artist Michael Carowsky. She was widowed in 1745 and took over her husband's studio. She was employed as a decorator of the Gothenburg Cathedral from the 1750s to the 1770s. She is known as the artist behind the pulpit in the Lerum Church from 1752. She played a great role as the teacher of several art students in her studio. Her daughter Christina Elisabeth Carowsky (1745–1797) was a portrait painter.

== See also ==
- Margareta Capsia

== Other sources ==
- Svenskt konstnärslexikon (Swedish Art dictionary) Allhems Förlag, Malmö (1952) (in Swedish)
