= Diana and Callisto (Wilson) =

Painting by Richard Wilson

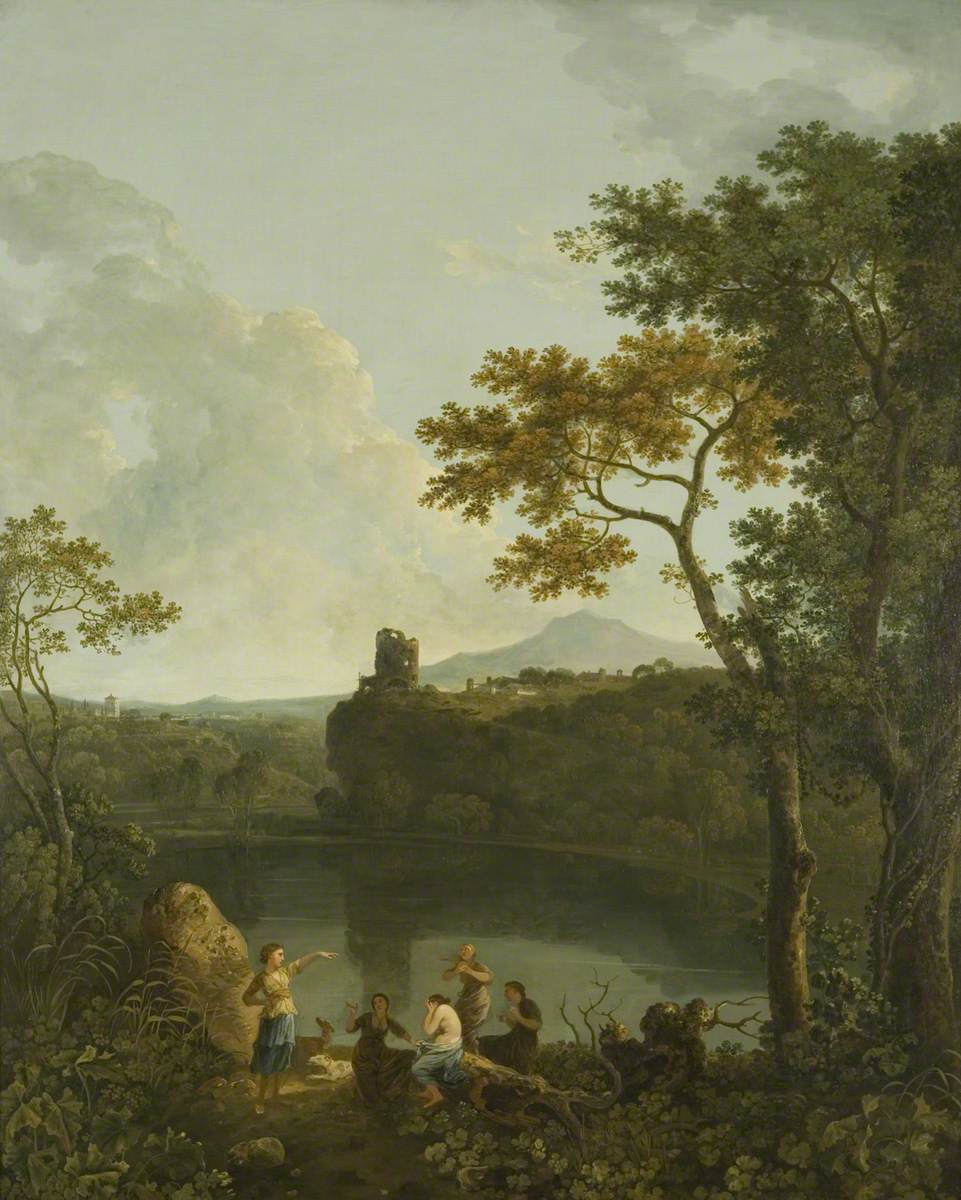
- Artist: Richard Wilson
- Year: 1765
- Type: Oil on canvas, historical landscape painting
- Dimensions: 229.2 cm × 183.4 cm (90.2 in × 72.2 in)
- Location: City Museum and Art Gallery, Bristol

Diana and Callisto is a 1765 oil painting by the British artist Richard Wilson.It combines elements of landscape and history painting in depicting the story from Ovid's poem Metamorphoses in which one of the goddess Diana discovers that her maid Callisto has been seduced and become pregnant by Jupiter and furiously rebukes her in front of the other nymphs.

The Welsh-born Wilson had spent several years in Italy before returning to Britain where he became the pre-eminent landscape painter and a founder of the Royal Academy. This was one of four paintings with classical themes he produced for the art collector Henry Blundell of Ince Hall. While much of the painting is inspired by the countryside around Rome, the stone ruins in the distance is the round tower of Dolbadarn Castle in North Wales.

Today the painting is in the collection of the City Museum and Art Gallery in Bristol, having been purchased in 1955. In 1796 J.M.W. Turner, near the beginning of his career, produced his own Diana and Callisto based on an engraving of Wilson's work.

== Bibliography ==
- Carter, Julia. Bristol Museum and Art Gallery: Guide to the Art Collection. Bristol Books, 2017.
- Sambrook, James. The Eighteenth Century: The Intellectual and Cultural Context of English Literature 1700-1789. Routledge, 2014.
