= Giacomo Leonardis =

Italian painter

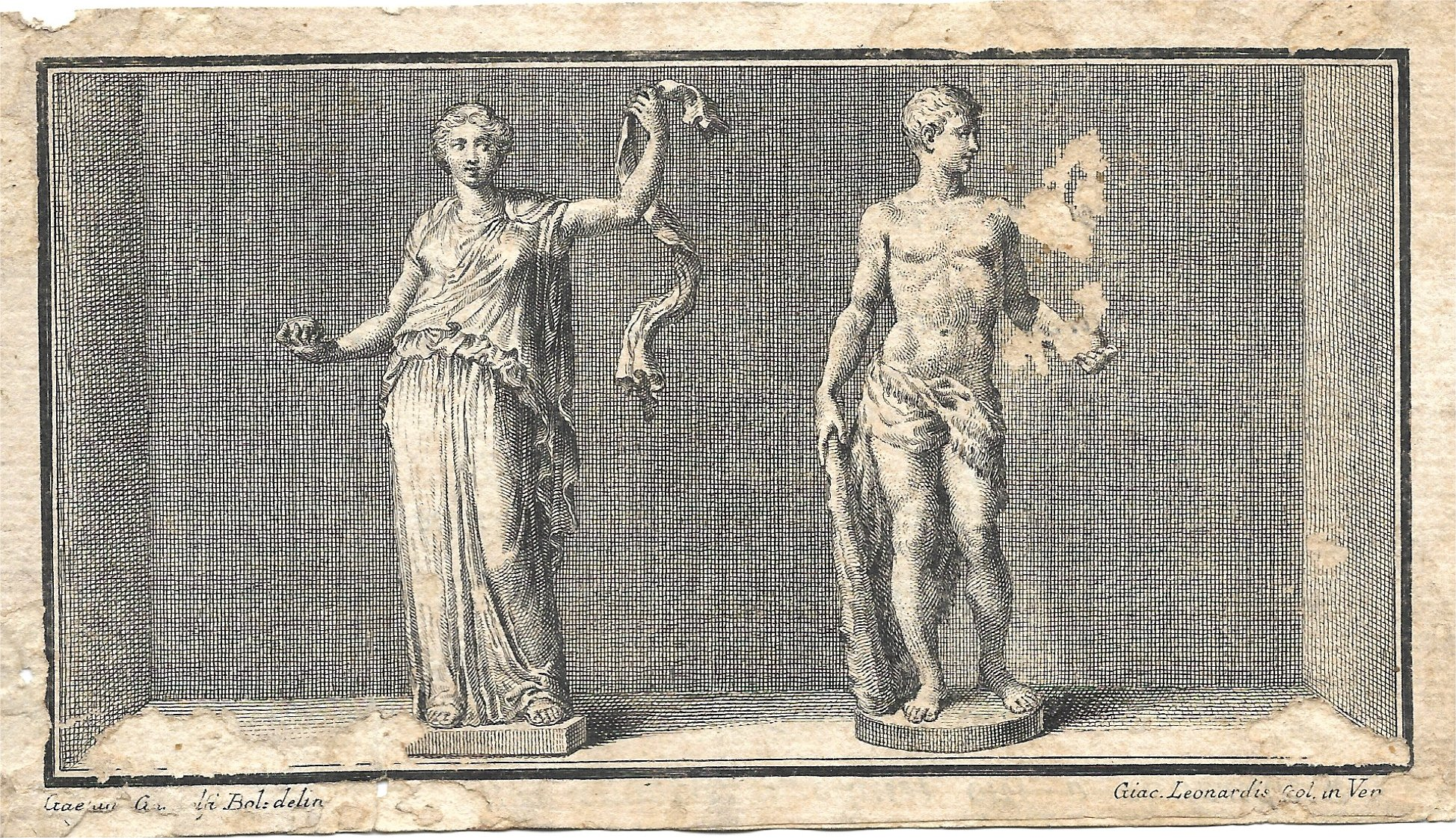

Giacomo Leonardis (1723–1797) was an Italian engraver and etcher. He was born at Palmanova in the Venetian Republic. He was instructed by M. Benville and Tiepolo, and obtained the first prize at the Accademia di Belle Arti of Venice. He was skillful in preserving the character of the artist he represented. He etched several plates after Italian masters, including Giulio Carpioni, Sebastiano Conca, and Tintoretto.

Also he engraved Gerusalemme Liberata based on designs of Bernardo Castello used in the 1617 edition of the poem. There are 96 vignettes in the text and at the end of each canto engraved by Leonardis after Pietro Antonio Novelli. There is also a portrait of Tasso after Agostino Carracci, as well as an allegorical frontispiece. Both Novelli and Leonardis were influenced by Giambattista Tiepolo.

Leonardis died in Venice in 1797.
