= Eugen Felix =

Austrian painter

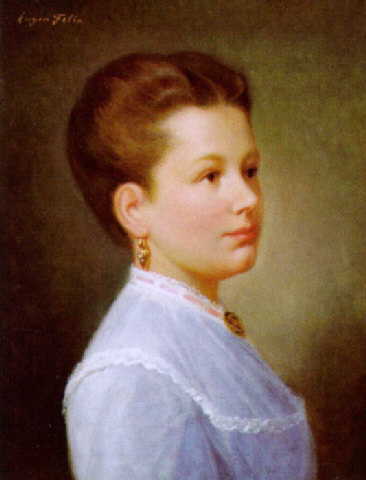
Young Lady (1860), Eugen Felix

Eugen Felix (born 27 of April 1836, died 21 of August 1906) was an Austrian painter. He started his studies with Ferdinand Georg Waldmüller and continued in Paris with Léon Cogniet. Felix is particularly well known for his portraits, but he also did historic and mythological scenes.
