= Thomas Kirk (English artist) =

English artist

Thomas Kirk (1765–1797) was an English artist, book illustrator, and engraver of the late 18th century.

A pupil of Richard Cosway, Kirk exhibited the first of 25 works at the Royal Academy in 1785. Although he illustrated James Thomson's The Seasons in 1793, he was employed most consistently by Charles Cooke for his editions of celebrated works of literature. Cooke's Pocket Edition of English Poets (1796-8) was especially popular. Kirk's illustrations impressed many of his contemporaries. Edward Dayes said of him: 'He passed like a meteor through the region of art'.

He created many famous engravings based either upon his own work or works by, amongst others, Angelica Kauffman, Richard Westall, and Sir Joshua Reynolds. After his death appeared Outlines from the figures and compositions upon the Greek, Roman, and Etruscan vases of the late Sir William Hamilton : with engraved borders / drawn and engraved by the late Mr. Kirk.

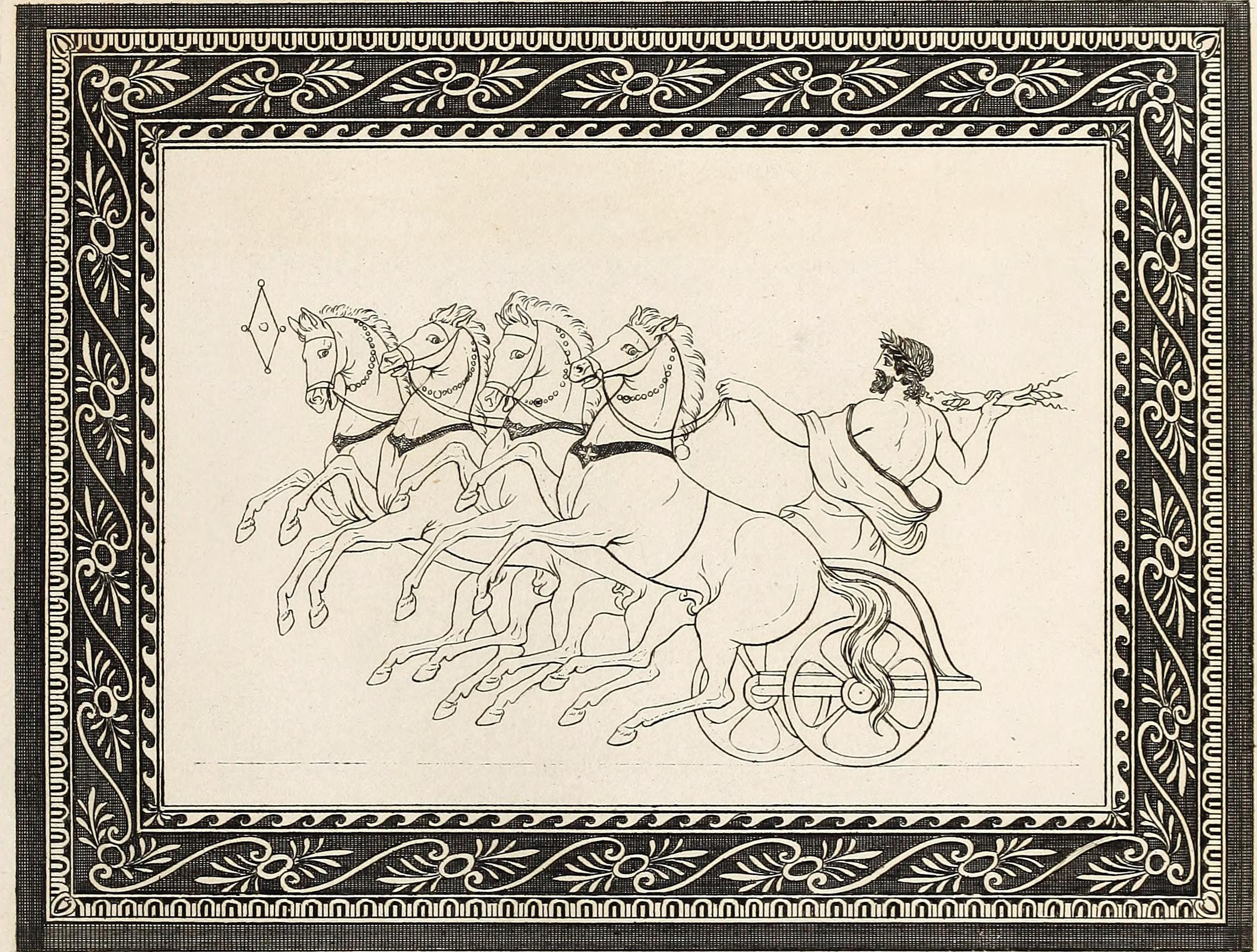

Original drawings by him are rare, often in oval format, and owe much to the influence of Kauffman. The draughtsmanship is of the highest quality and some his pictures are described as 'ornamented' by R. W. Satchwell, who occasionally drew the surrounds.

His promising career was cut short by illness. Working to the end, he died in 1797 of consumption (i.e. tuberculosis), having exhibited his final works at the Royal Academy (Evening and A Dream) the previous year. His last known address was 8 Judd Place West, New Road (renamed Euston Road in 1857), London.
