= Giorgio Anselmi (painter) =

Italian painter

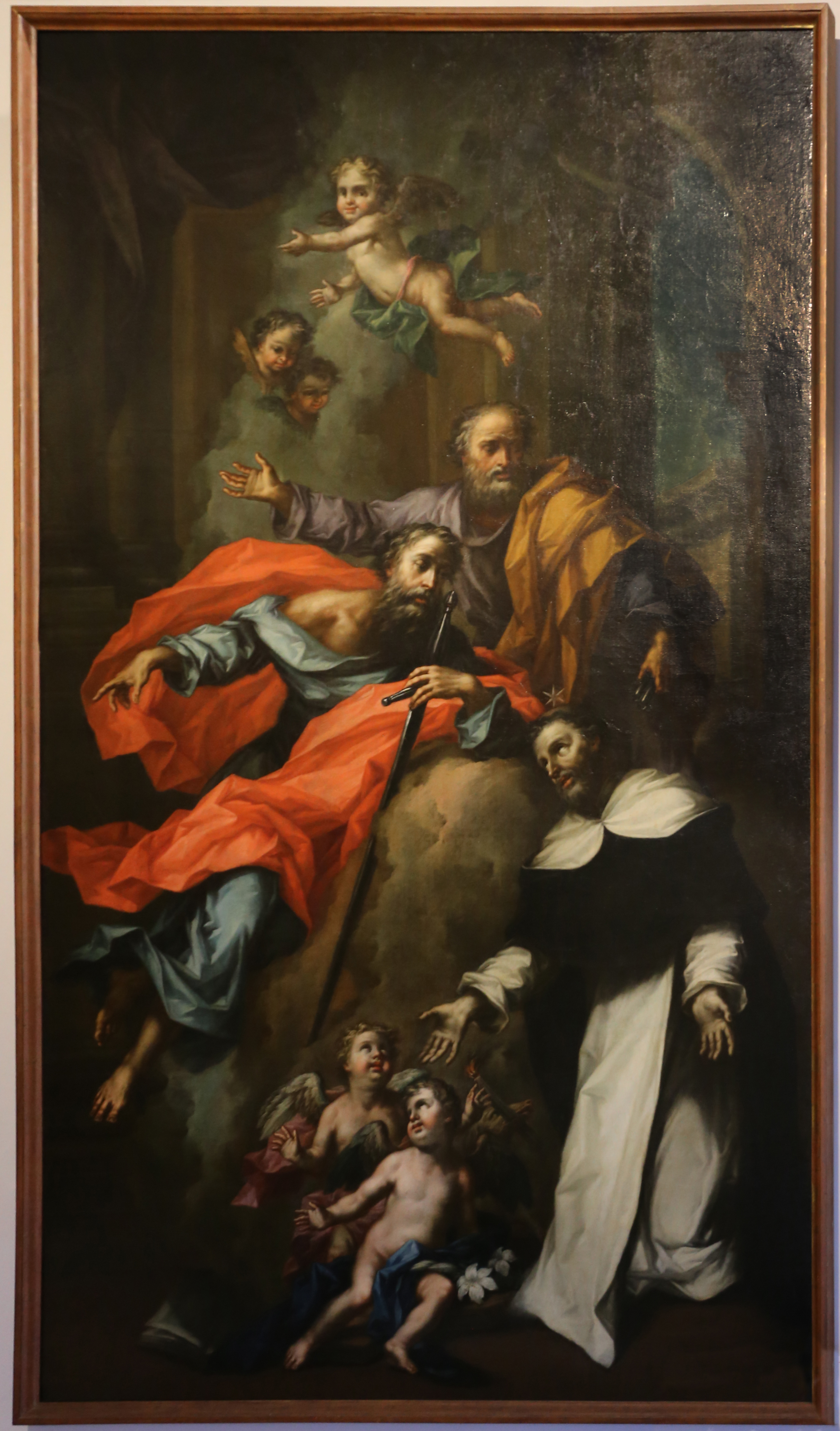
Apparition of Saints Peter and Paul to Saint Dominic, palazzo Ducale, Mantua

Giorgio Anselmi (5 April 1723 – 30 March 1797) was an Italian painter.

Born in Verona, he studied with Antonio Balestra and worked mainly in Veneto, Lombardy, Emilia and Trentino with frescoes and oil works. He painted the dome of Sant'Andrea and some rooms of Palazzo Te in Mantua.

He died in Lendinara, from a fall while painting the dome of the local cathedral.
