= Padraig Marrinan =

Irish artist (1906–1975)

- Born: 1906; Belfast
- Died: 1973; Omagh
- Education: self-taught
- Known for: landscapes, religious
- Elected: Royal Ulster Academy

Padraig Marrinan (10 December 1906 – 1973) was an Irish painter. He was born in Belfast, Ireland. He contracted polio when he was five, and received a private education. He taught himself to paint, and made landscapes in counties Antrim, Clare, Donegal and Kerry. His ecclesiastical work includes Our Lady of the Missions for Holy Cross Church, Ardoyne, Belfast, and The Madonna and Child of Loreto for the Convent School, Omagh, County Tyrone. A charcoal drawing is in the National Gallery of Ireland.

He showed work at the Royal Ulster Academy, of which he was a member.

He died in 1973 in Omagh, County Tyrone.
