= Louis Stanislas Marin-Lavigne =

French painter

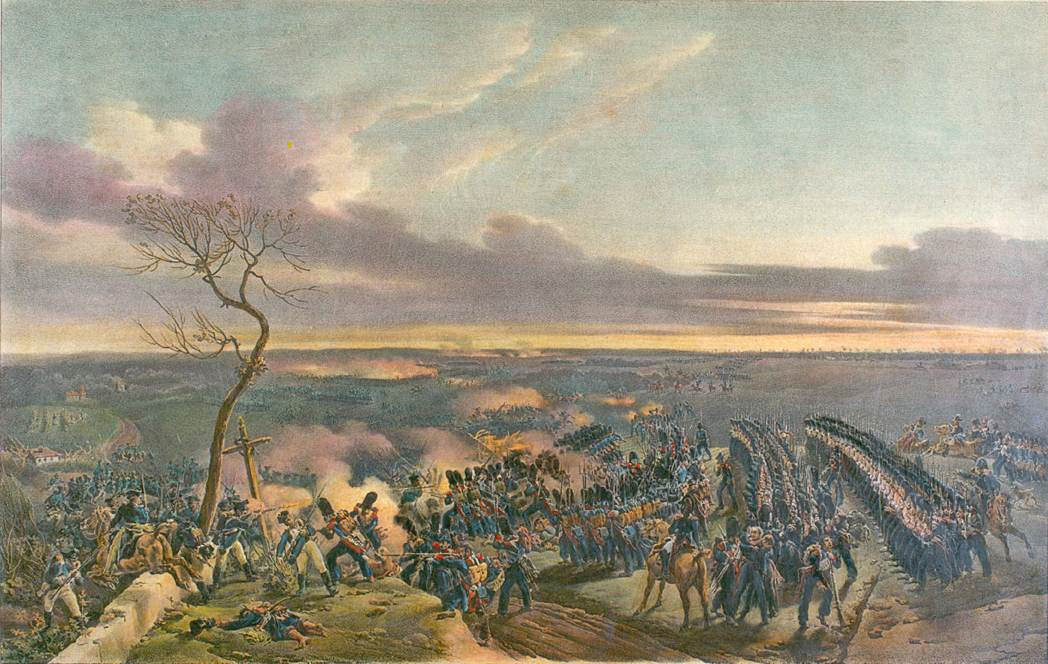
Battle of Montmirail, painting by Horace Vernet, lithograph by Louis Stanislas Marin-Lavigne

Louis Stanislas Marin-Lavigne (1797 - 1860) was a French painter and lithographer. Many of his lithographs today are in major collections in London and New York City.

He obtained his first instruction in painting from Anne-Louis Girodet de Roussy-Trioson, and from 1814 to 1819, followed the courses of the Ecole des Beaux Arts. He first exhibited both as a painter and lithographer in 1824. His best known work, ' The Extreme Unction,' painted in 1824, was reported to be in the collection of M. Dussommerard in the mid-1860s. Amongst his other original works may be cited, 'The Obsequies of the Kings of the ancient Egyptians,' and 'Gaspar Netscher and his Daughter, which are in the gallery at Dresden. His lithographs after eminent painters, old and modern, are too numerous to mention. He obtained a second-class medal in 1840.
