= Giovanni Battista Chiappe =

Italian painter (1723–1765)

Giovanni Battista Chiappe (1723–1765) was an Italian painter of the late-Baroque period, active mainly in Milan and Genoa. He was born in Novi, Republic of Genoa and trained in Rome with a Genovese, Giuseppe Paravagna. In Alessandria, he painted a canvas of San Iganzio for the church of the same name.
