= Säve Church =

Church in Gothenburg, Sweden

Coordinates: 57°48′10″N 11°55′07″E

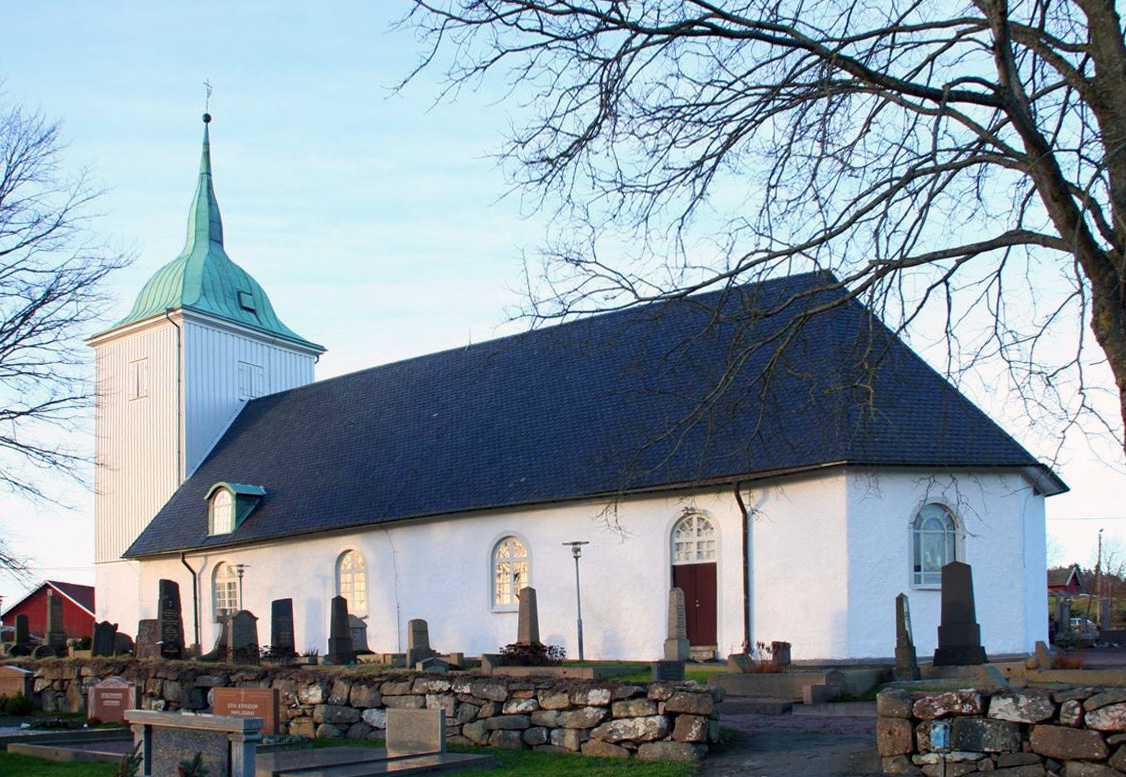
Säve Church

The Säve Church (Swedish: Säve kyrka) is a medieval church in Gothenburg. It is located on the Hisingen island and belongs to the parish of Tuve-Säve. It belonged to the Säve parish until 2010, when the parishes of Tuve, Säve and Rödbo were merged.

The church was erected in the early 13th century. It was first known as St. Olaf Church, after the saintly king Olaf II of Norway. The nave has a barrel vault, built in 1696. In 1704, the ceiling was covered with paintings by German artist Christian von Schönfeldt. In 1729, a cupola was built over the choir, painted by Johan Ross. The paintings depict scenes from both the New and the Old Testament. The porch was built in 1746, and the wooden tower above it was erected in 1750. The choir got its stained glass window in 1902. In 1945, the brick roof of the nave was replaced with slate.
