= 1766 in art =

Events from the year 1766 in art.

== Events ==
- 21 April – The Exhibition of 1766 opens at Spring Gardens in London
- 19 July – A baronetcy is created for British sculptor Henry Cheere.
- England's oldest surviving Georgian theatre is constructed in Stockton-on-Tees.
- The Drottningholm Palace Theatre is reopened as an opera house in Stockholm, Sweden, in its surviving form, designed by Carl Fredrik Adelcrantz.
- Denis Diderot's Essais sur la peinture is published.

== Works ==
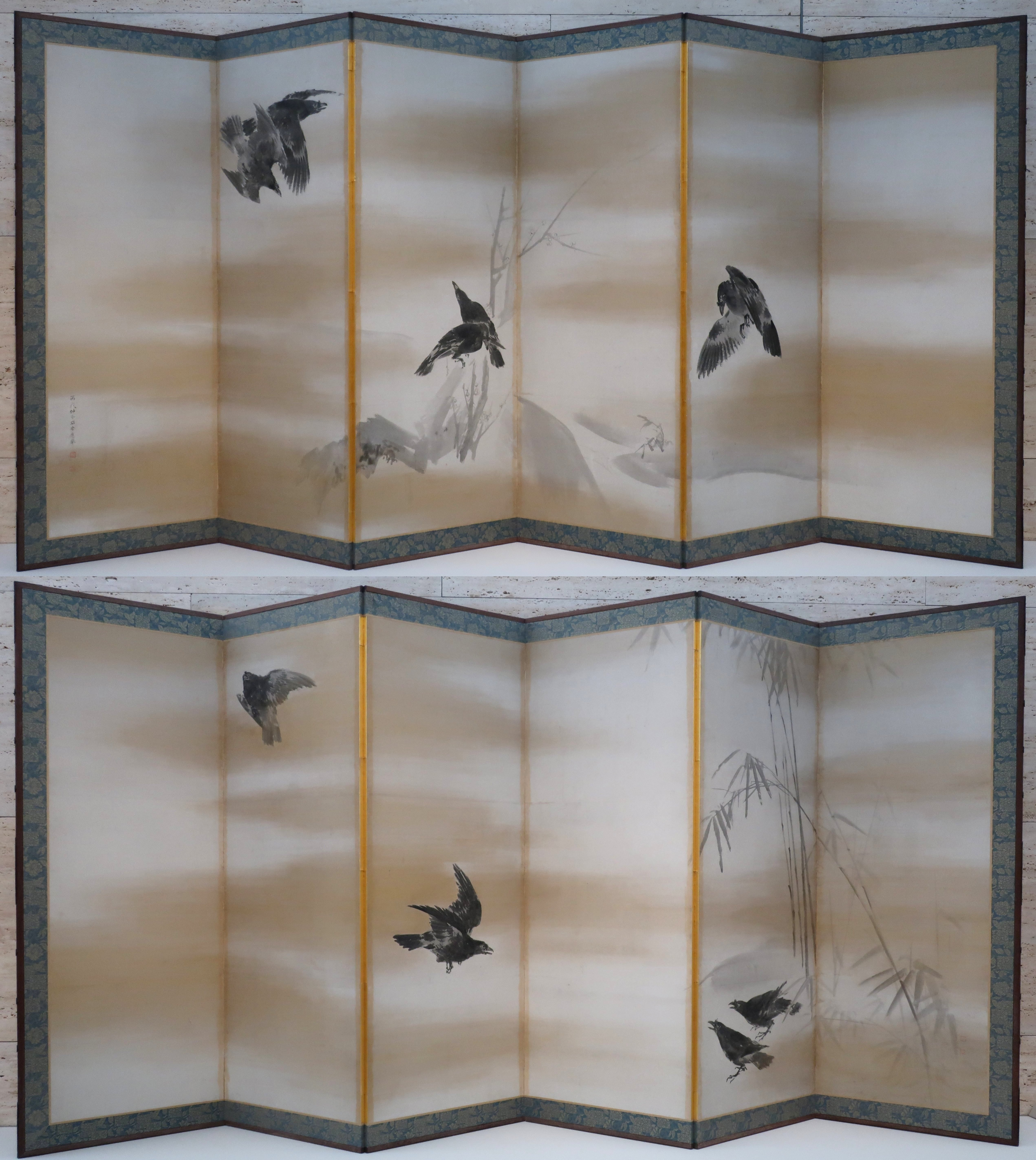
Maruyama Ōkyo, Crows, 1766; pair of sixfold screens; ink and gold on paper.

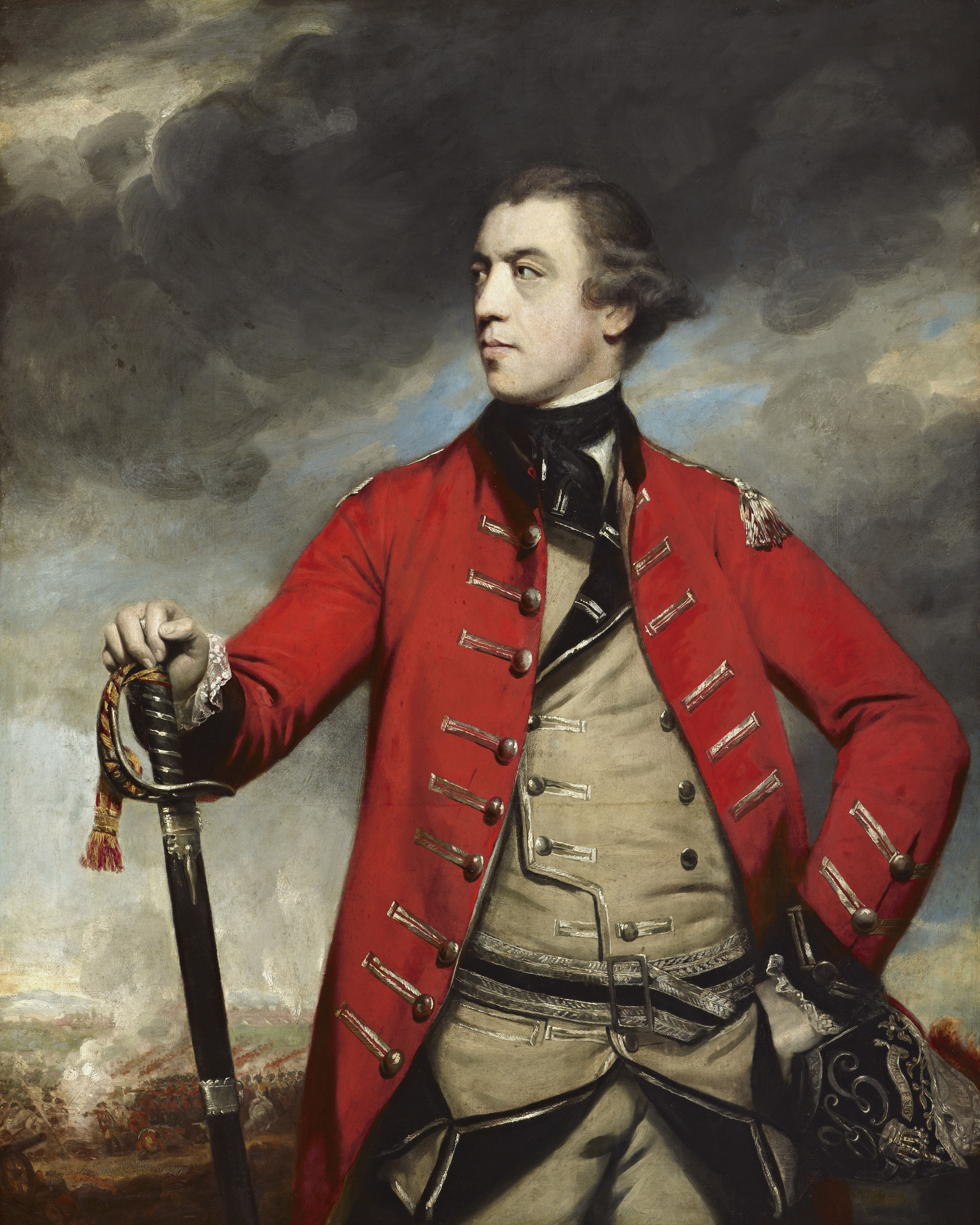
Portrait of John Burgoyne by Joshua Reynolds

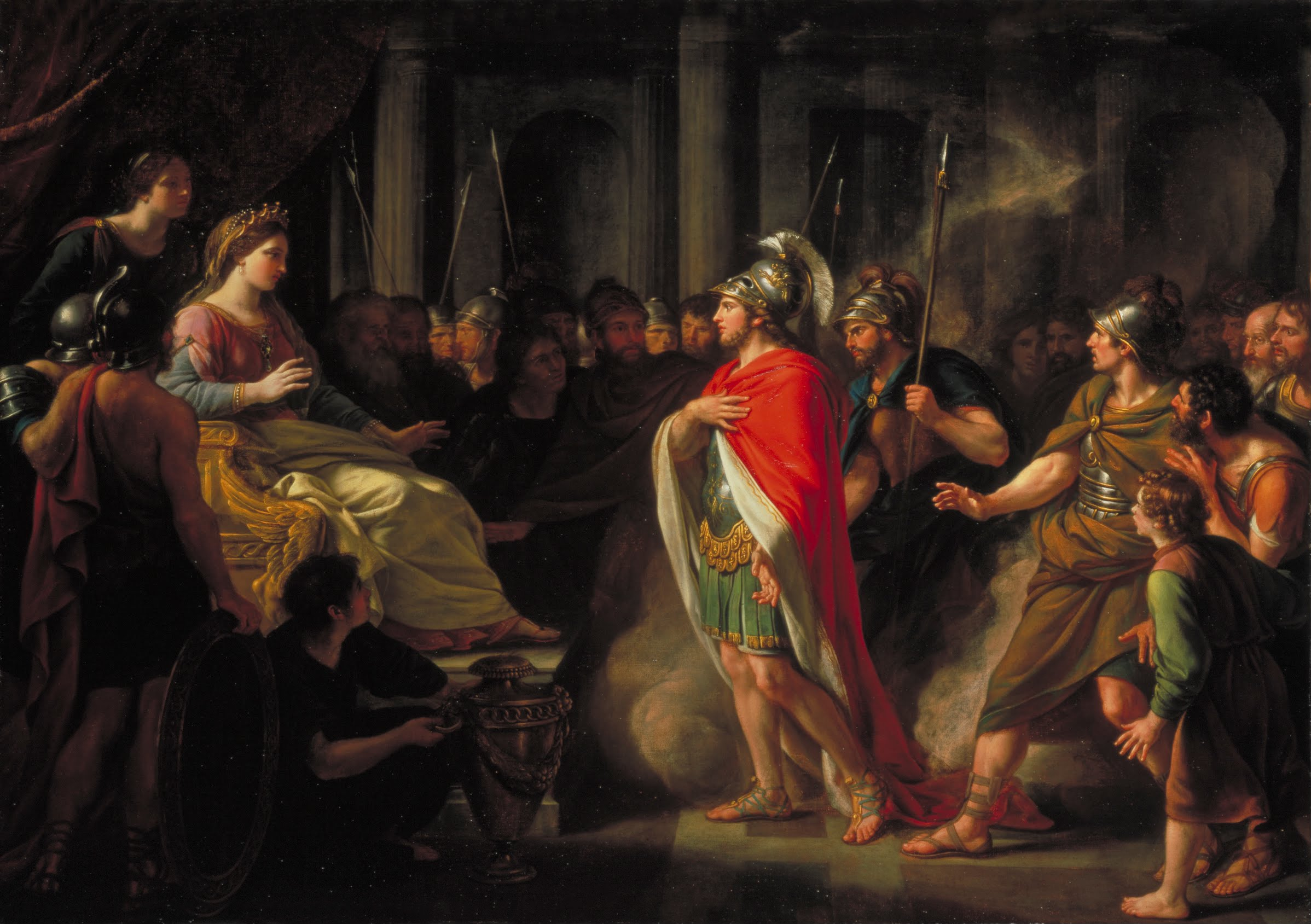
The Meeting of Dido and Aeneas by Nathaniel Dance-Holland

- Pompeo Batoni – Portrait of William Gordon
- Nathaniel Dance-Holland – The Meeting of Dido and Aeneas
- Thomas Gainsborough – Portrait of David Garrick with a bust of Shakespeare (probably originally painted; lost)
- Jean-Antoine Houdon – Bruno of Cologne (sculpture for Santa Maria degli Angeli e dei Martiri in Rome)
- Maruyama Ōkyo – Crows
- Allan Ramsay – Portrait of David Hume
- Joshua Reynolds – Portrait of John Burgoyne
- Hubert Robert – A View of Ripetta
- Claude-Joseph Vernet – Coast Scene with a British Man of War
- Benjamin West – Pylades and Orestes Brought as Victims before Iphigenia
- Joseph Wright of Derby – A Philosopher Lecturing on the Orrery

== Births ==
- March 1 – Johann Conrad Felsing, German topographer and engraver using stippling (died 1819)
- March 2 – Thomas Henry, French painter and art patron (died 1836)
- March 16 – Jean-Frédéric Waldeck, artist and explorer (died 1875)
- April 1 – François-Xavier Fabre, French painter of historical subjects (died 1837)
- April 6 – Wilhelm von Kobell, German painter, printmaker and teacher (died 1853)
- September 16 – Jes Bundsen, Danish architectural and landscape painter and etcher (died 1829)
- October 14 – Friedrich Carl Gröger, north-German portrait painter and lithographer (died 1838)
- December 22 – Johann Samuel Arnhold, German painter in oil and water-colours, and on porcelain and enamel (died 1827)
- December 25 – Samuel Drummond, British painter especially portraits and marine genre works (died 1844)
- date unknown
  - Pierre-Charles Bridan, French sculptor (died 1836)
  - Mariano Gerada, sculptor and woodworker (died 1823)

== Deaths ==
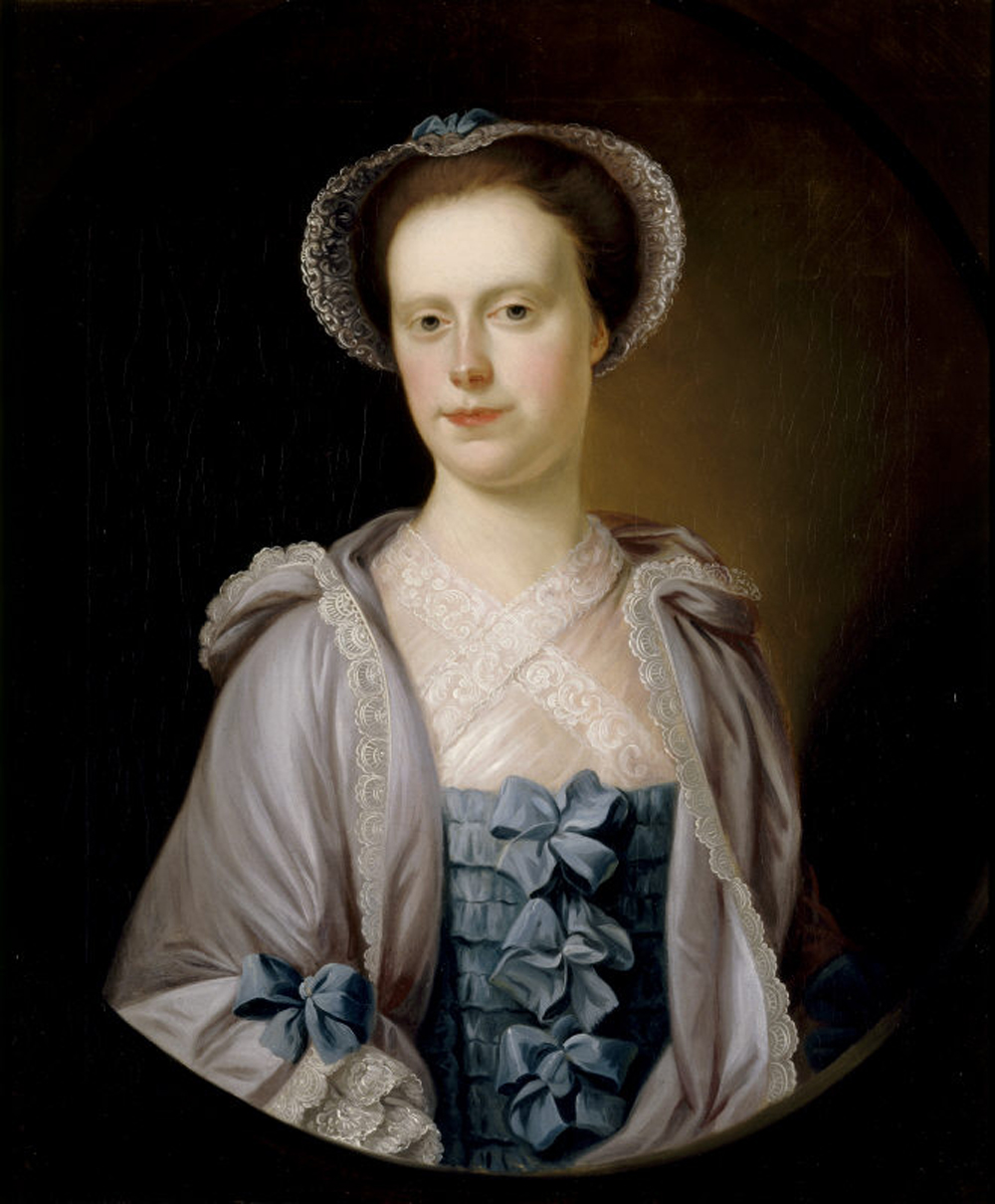
Margaret Fownes-Luttrell

- January 7 – Giacomo Boni, Italian painter (born 1688)
- January 19 – Giovanni Niccolò Servandoni, French architect and painter (born 1695)
- March 4 – Joseph Aved, also called le Camelot (The Hawker) and Avet le Batave (The Dutch Avet), French Rococo portraitist (born 1702)
- April 18 – Corrado Giaquinto, Italian Rococo painter (born 1703)
- May 5 – Olof Arenius, Swedish portrait painter (born 1701)
- June 22 – Carlo Zimech, Maltese priest and painter (born 1696)
- July 17 – Giuseppe Castiglione, Italian Jesuit Brother, missionary in China, painter at the court of the Emperor (b. 1688)
- July 18 – Mauro Antonio Tesi, Italian painter of the late-Baroque period, active mainly in Bologna (b. 1730)
- August 13 – Margaret Fownes-Luttrell, English heiress and painter (b. 1726)
- November 7
  - Vincenzo Meucci, Italian painter whose patrons included Anna Maria Luisa de' Medici (b. 1694)
  - Jean-Marc Nattier, French painter (b. 1685)
- date unknown
  - Antonio Consetti, Italian historical painter (b. 1686)
  - William Elliott, English engraver (born 1727)
