= Felsing =

Felsing is a German surname. Notable people with the surname include:

- Johann Conrad Felsing (1766–1819), German engraver
- Jakob Felsing (1802–1883), German engraver, son of Johann
- Otto Felsing (1831–1878), German engraver
