= The American School (painting) =

Painting by Matthew Pratt

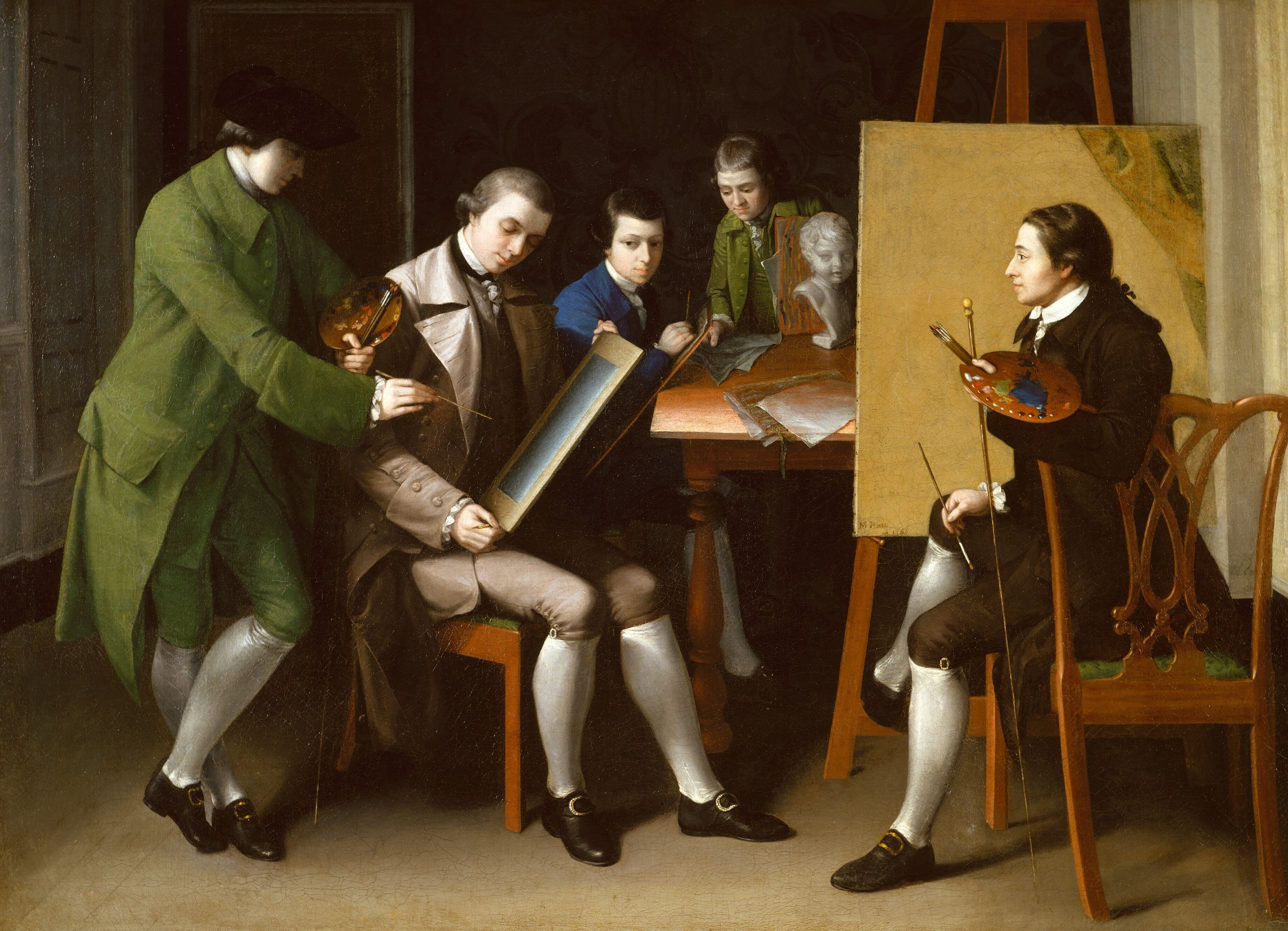
- Artist: Matthew Pratt
- Year: 1765
- Type: Oil on canvas, portrait
- Dimensions: 91.4 cm × 127.6 cm (36.0 in × 50.2 in)
- Location: Metropolitan Museum of Art, New York City

The American School is a 1765 oil painting by the American artist Matthew Pratt. It depicts an art class in progress in the studio of the Anglo-American painter Benjamin West in London. After a Grand Tour in Italy, the Pennsylvania-born West settled in England and became known for his history paintings, becoming in 1792 the second President of the Royal Academy. He had numerous students in London over many decades, and the painting shows him instructing several of them early in his time in the capital. West is the figure standing on the left, while Pratt is believed to be the figure sitting at the easel. Pratt returned to America in 1768 and became a portrait painter.

The painting was displayed at the Exhibition of 1766 held by the Society of Artists at Spring Gardens. Today the work is in the collection of the Metropolitan Museum of Art in New York City, having been acquired in 1897.

== Bibliography ==
- Caldwell, John, Roque, Oswaldo Rodriguez & Johnson, Dale T. American Paintings in The Metropolitan Museum of Art. Vol. 1. Metropolitan Museum of Art, 1994.
- Grossman, Lloyd. Benjamin West and the Struggle to be Modern. Merrell Publishers, 2015.
- Van Horn, Jennifer. The Power of Objects in Eighteenth-Century British America. UNC Press Books,2017.
