= Exhibition of 1766 =

1766 art exhibition in London

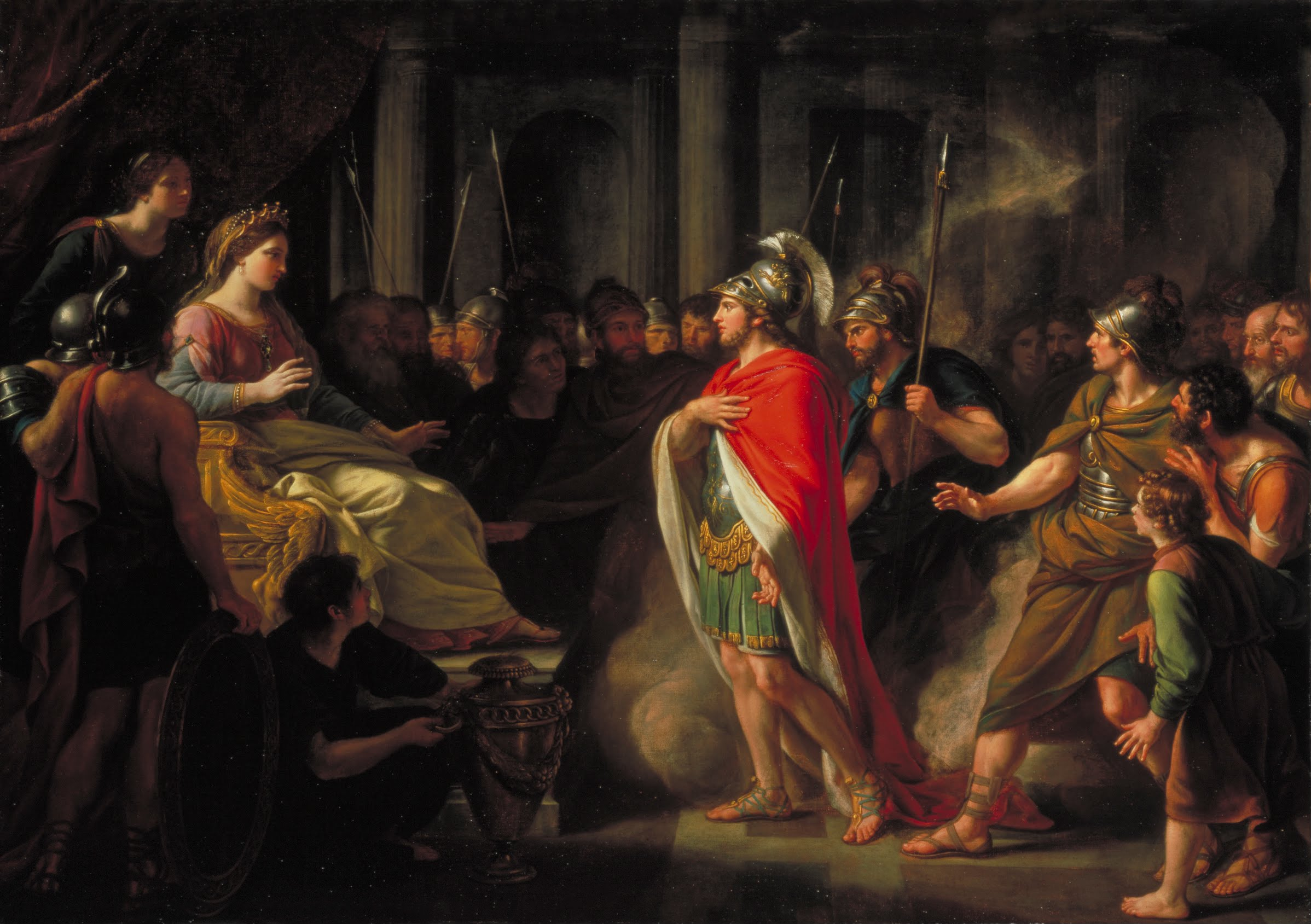
The Meeting of Dido and Aeneas by Nathaniel Dance-Holland

The Exhibition of 1766 was an art exhibition held at Spring Gardens in London from April and 19 May 1766. It was organised by the Society of Artists of Great Britain which included many leading painters, sculptors and architects of the mid-Georgian era.

== Exhibits ==
The growing influence of Neoclassicism was clear. Nathaniel Dance-Holland, who had been working in Rome, displayed The Meeting of Dido and Aeneas. However, it was the American artist Benjamin West who really drew attention with two history paintings with classical themes The Continence of Scipio and Pylades and Orestes Brought as Victims before Iphigenia both of which he had produced while in Italy.

One of West's pupils Matthew Pratt paid tribute to him in a painting titled The American School, showing West in his artist's studio giving instruction to his fellow artists. Another American John Singleton Copley earned praise for his portrait A Boy with a Flying Squirrel. Joseph Wright of Derby displayed his chiaroscuro masterpiece A Philosopher Lecturing on the Orrery, the first of his major scientific and philosophical paintings. Thomas Gainsborough featured a portrait of David Garrick, now lost, and a landscape. His rival Joshua Reynolds featured his Portrait of Jeffery Amherst. The landscape artist Richard Wikson submitted Snowdon from Llyn Nantlle, a view of his native Wales.

== Gallery ==
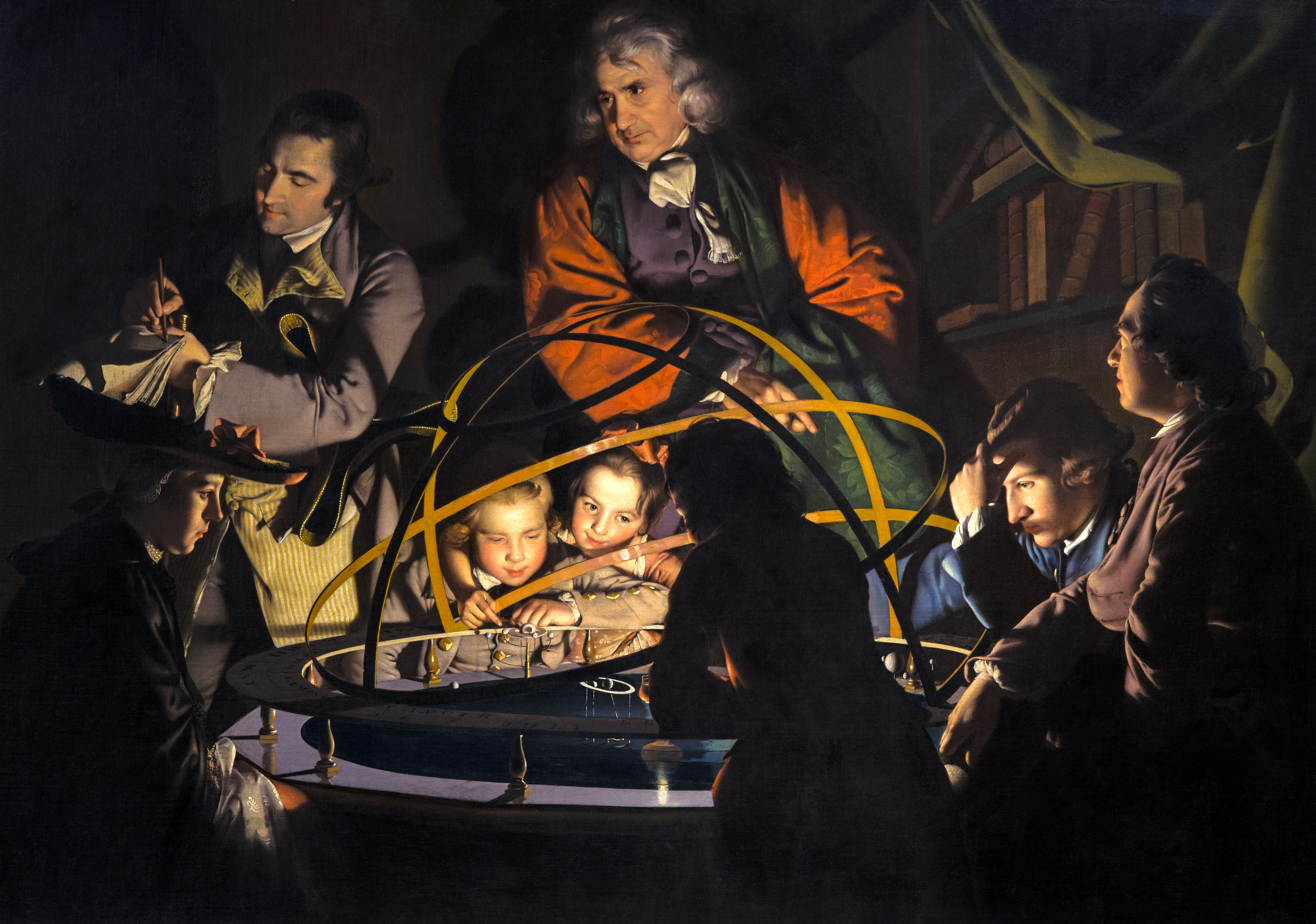
A Philosopher Lecturing on the Orrery by Joseph Wright of Derby

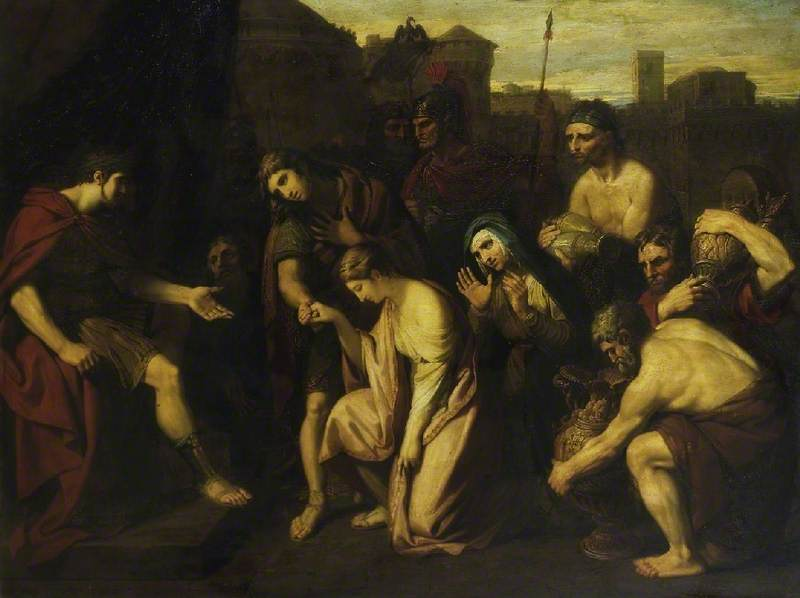
The Continence of Scipio by Benjamin West

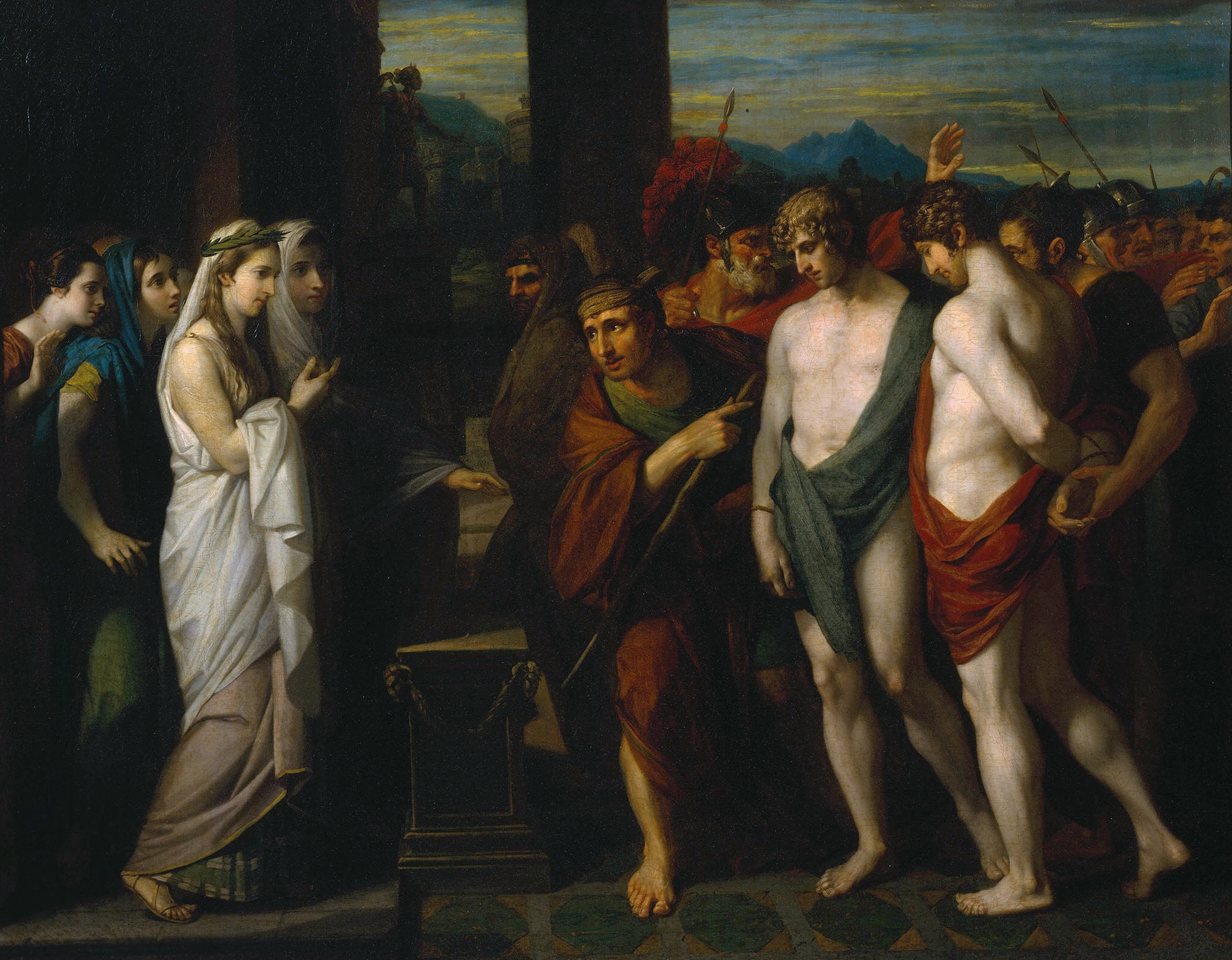
Pylades and Orestes Brought as Victims before Iphigenia by Benjamin West

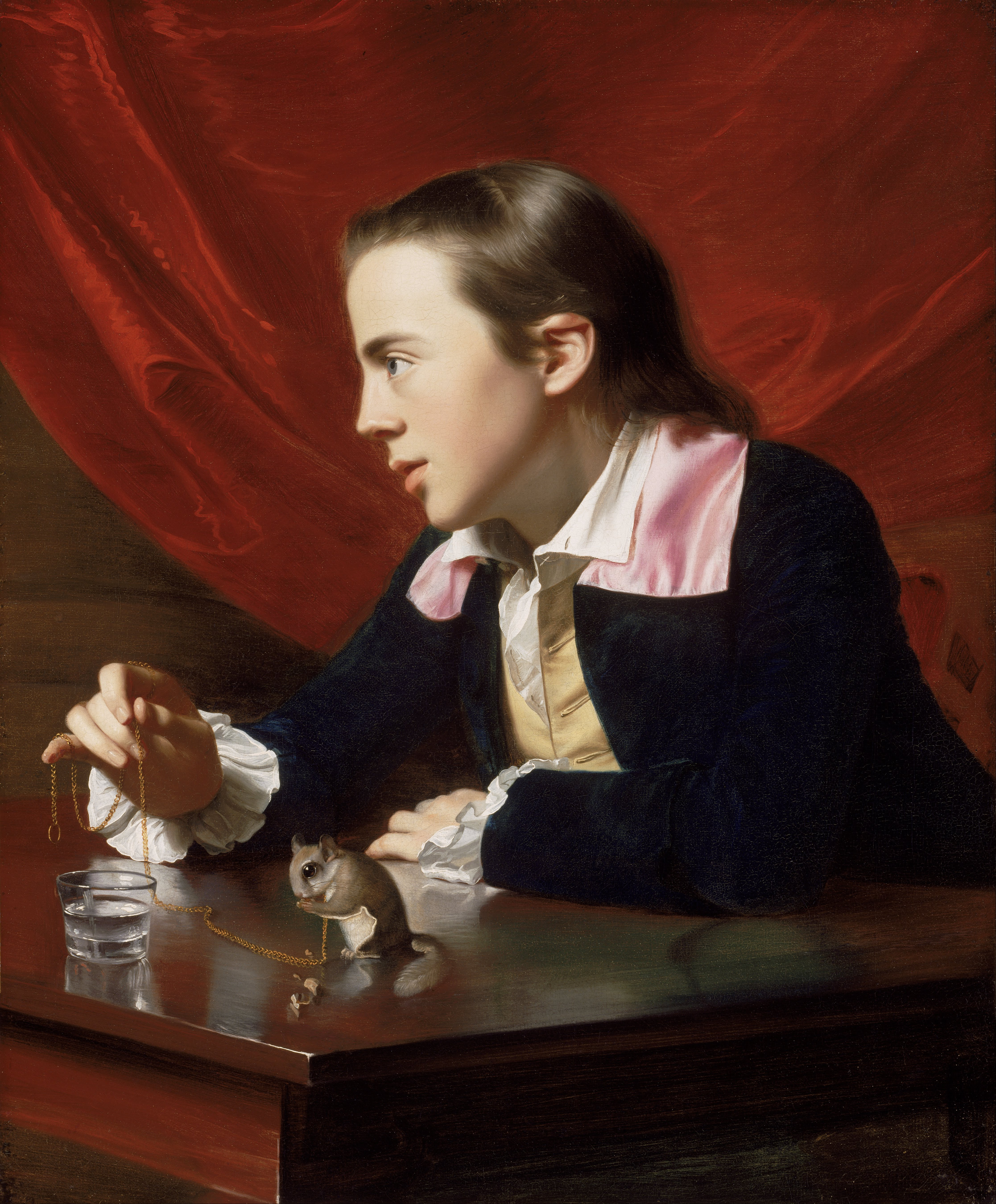
A Boy with a Flying Squirrel by John Singleton Copley

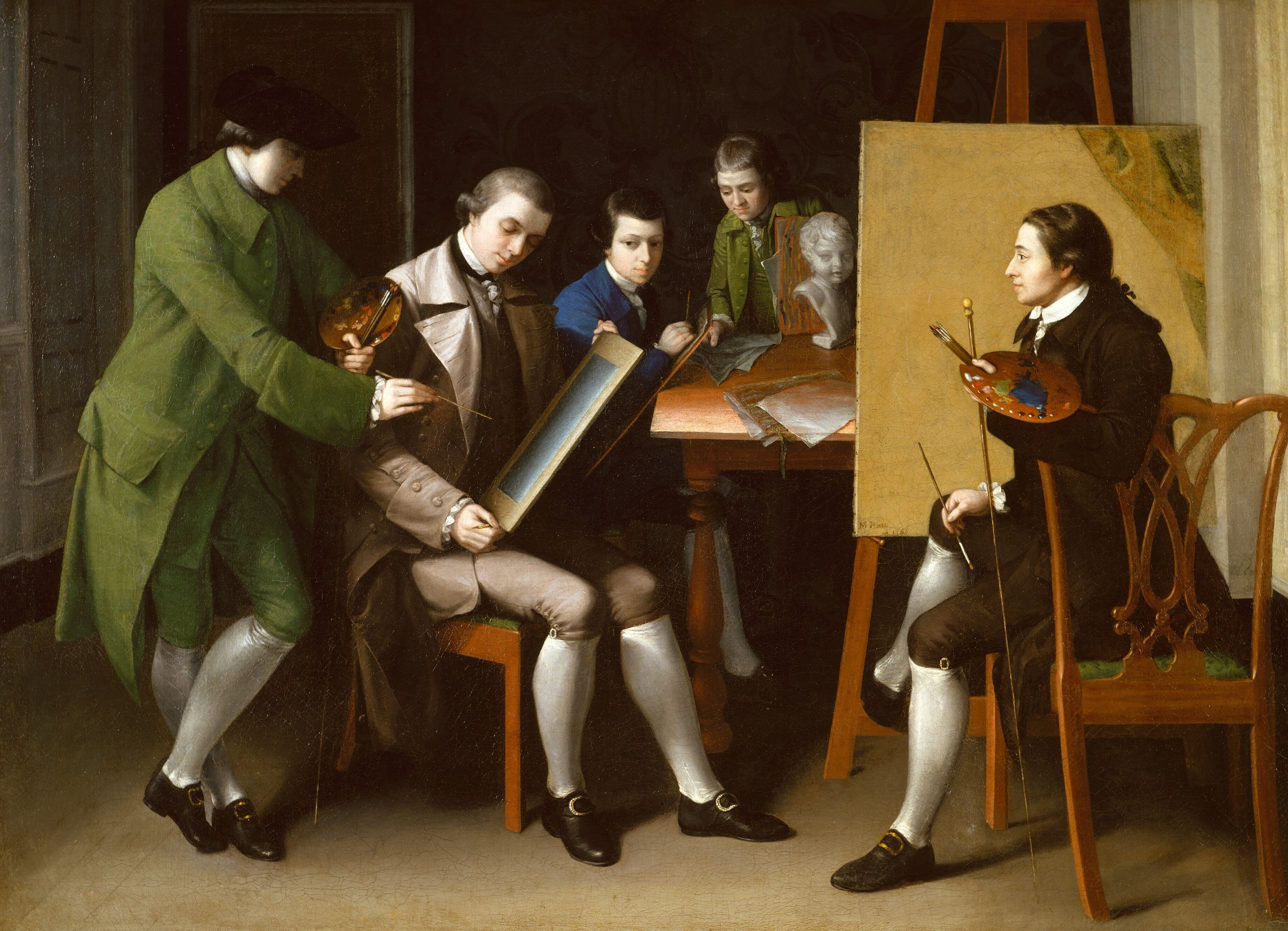
The American School by Matthew Pratt

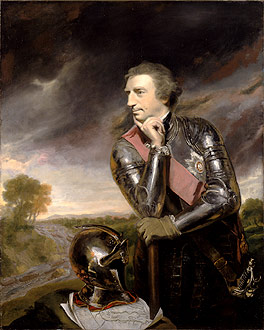
Portrait of Jeffery Amherst by Joshua Reynolds

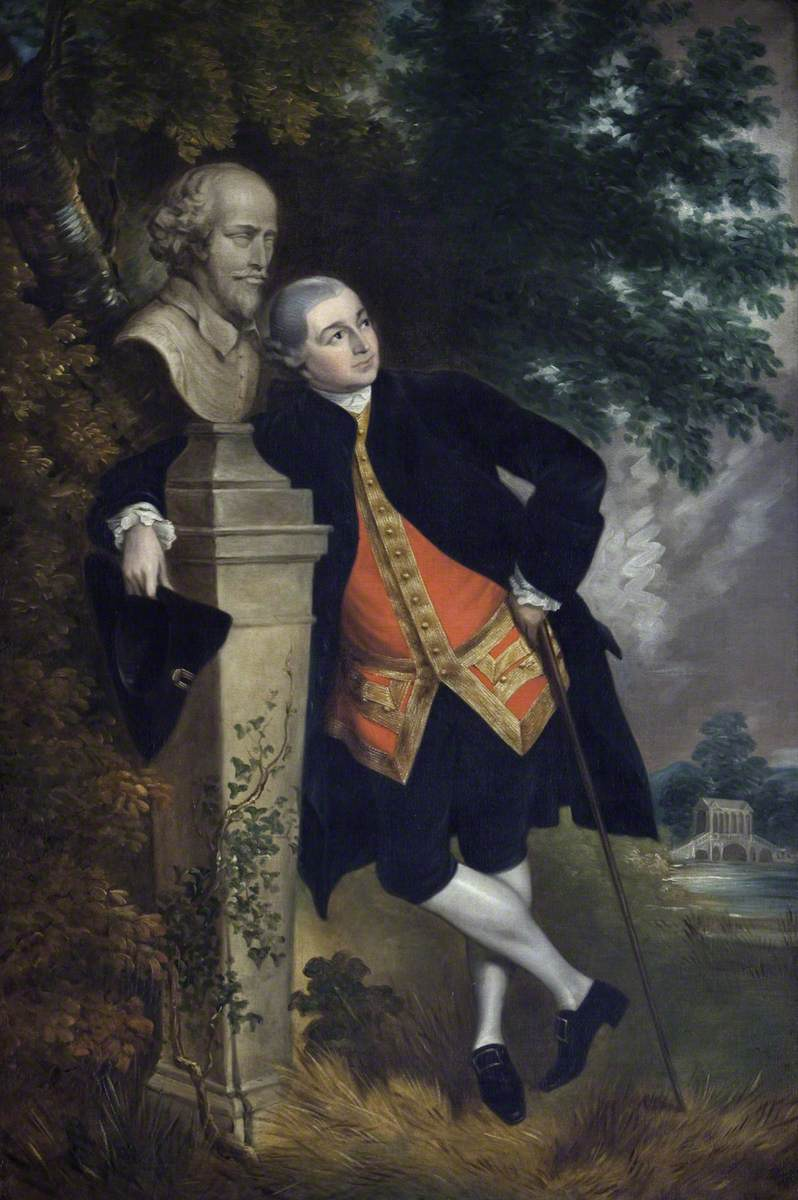
Replica of David Garrick with a Bust of Shakespeare by Thomas Gainsborough

Wooded Landscape with Country Wagon, Milkmaid and Drover by Thomas Gainsborough

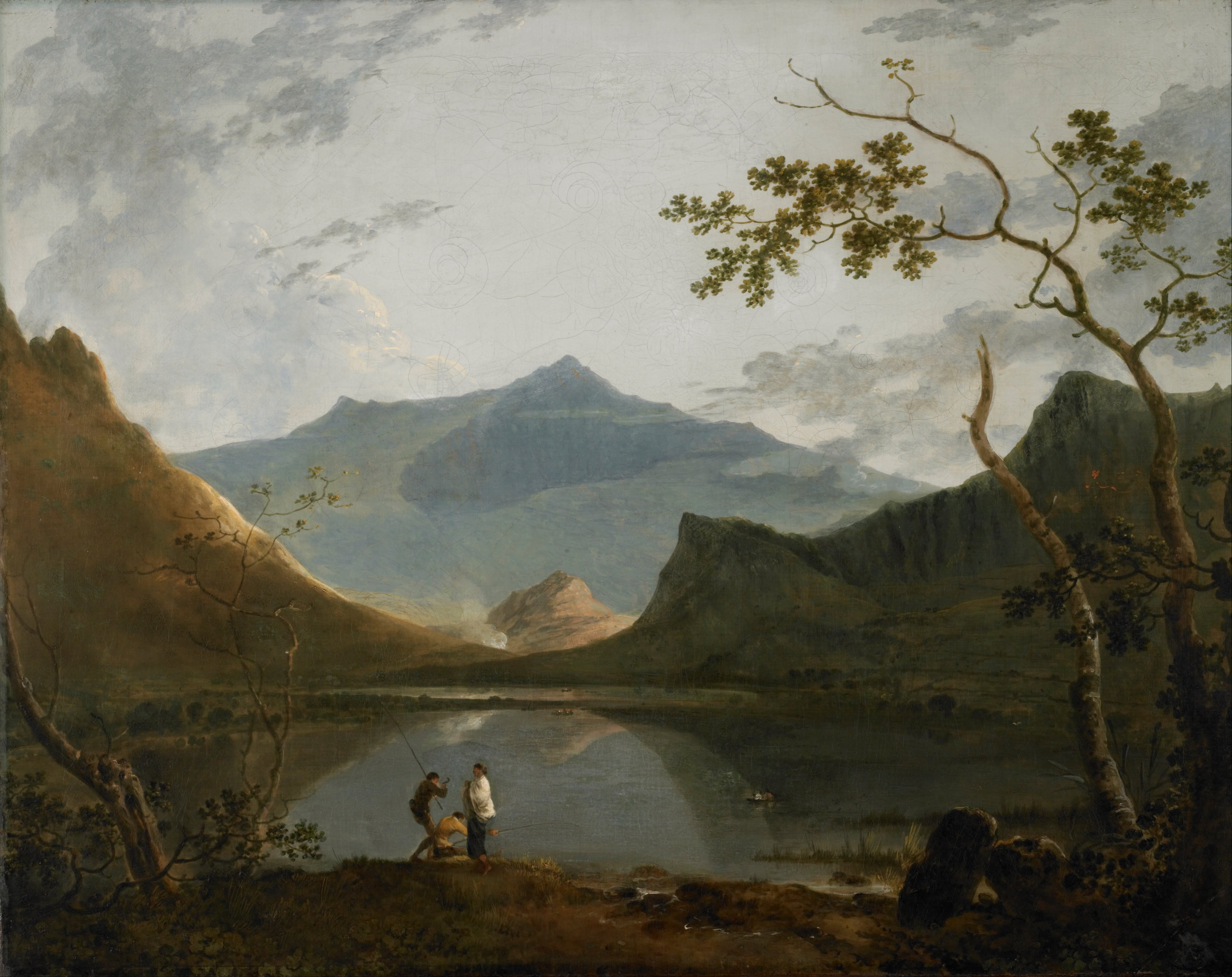
Snowdon from Llyn Nantlle by Richard Wilson

== Bibliography ==
- Barratt, Carrie Rebora . John Singleton Copley in America. John Singleton Copley in America. Metropolitan Museum of Art, 1995.
- Grossman, Lloyd. Benjamin West and the Struggle to be Modern. Merrell Publishers, 2015
- Hargreaves, Matthew. Candidates for Fame: The Society of Artists of Great Britain, 1760-1791. Paul Mellon Centre for Studies in British Art, 2005.
- McIntyre, Ian. Joshua Reynolds: The Life and Times of the First President of the Royal Academy. Allen Lane, 2003.
- Solkin, David H. Richard Wilson: The Landscape of Reaction. Tate Gallery, 1982.
- Wilson, Simon. British Art: From Holbein to the Present Day. Tate Gallery, 1979.
