= Portrait of Jeffery Amherst (Reynolds) =

1765 painting by Joshua Reynolds

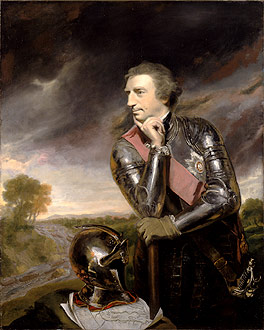
- Artist: Joshua Reynolds
- Year: 1765
- Type: Oil on canvas, portrait painting
- Dimensions: 127 cm × 101.6 cm (50 in × 40.0 in)
- Location: Mead Art Museum; Massachusetts

Portrait of Jeffery Amherst is a 1765 portrait painting by the English artist Joshua Reynolds. It depicts the British Army general Jeffery Amherst. Amherst had enjoyed success during the Seven Years' War overseeing the Conquest of Canada from 1758 to 1760. The painting commemorates this, depicting him in armour and wearing the Order of the Garter against the backdrop of British troops moving the Saint Lawrence River. A helmet on a rock holds down a map of Montreal which he had captured in 1760.

The painting was displayed at the Exhibition of 1766 held by the Society of Artists in Pall Mall in London. A print was produced based on it by the Irish engraver James Watson the same year. Today the work is in the Mead Art Museum of Amherst College in Massachusetts. Another painting of Amherst by Reynolds, produced in 1768, is now in the National Gallery of Canada.

== See also ==
- Portrait of Jeffery Amherst (Gainsborough), a 1780 painting by Thomas Gainsborough

== Bibliography ==
- McIntyre, Ian. Joshua Reynolds: The Life and Times of the First President of the Royal Academy. Allen Lane, 2003.
- Postle, Edward (ed.) Joshua Reynolds: The Creation of Celebrity. Harry N. Abrams, 2005.
