= James Claypoole =

American painter

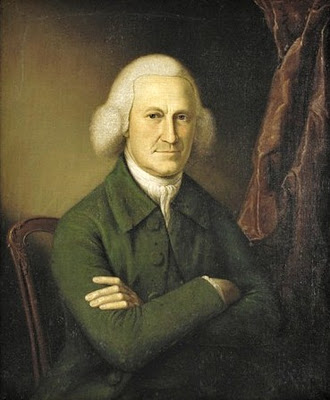
Charles Willson Peale's Portrait of James Claypoole c. 1783

James Claypoole Sr. (January 22, 1720/21 – September 21, 1784) was an American portrait painter, house painter, and glazier. He was born in Philadelphia, Pennsylvania, the son of Joseph Claypoole (1677-1740/41) and his second wife Edith Ward Claypoole (b. ?-d. 1737). He died in Philadelphia.

== Artistic training and works ==
In 1741 he was still apprenticed to Gustavus Hesselius (1682–1755), a Swedish-born painter who resided in Philadelphia. It is probable that he painted the portraits of his brother, George Claypoole Sr. (1706-c.1770), and sister-in-law, Hannah Claypoole (c.1708–1745), as the portraits were in the household of George Claypoole Sr., joiner, cabinetmaker, and shop keeper, Front Street, Philadelphia, Pa., c.1770.

The provenance of the paintings shows they were inherited by George and Hannah Claypoole's eldest son, George Claypoole Jr., (1733–1793), joiner and cabinet maker, of 65 Walnut Street, Philadelphia, Pa. Around 1793 they were inherited by George Jr. and Mary (Parkhouse) Claypoole's eldest and surviving son, Dr. Willam Claypoole, (1758–1797) of Wilmington, North Carolina. In 1797 they passed to William and Mary (Wright) Claypoole's only surviving child, Ann Grainger Claypoole (ca 1791–1832), of Wilmington, North Carolina. The pair of portraits has been owned since 1984 by the National Society of Colonial Dames of America. They are housed at the Burgin-Wright House in Wilmington, North Carolina.

Claypoole had two early students who went on to become well-known artists: his son James Claypoole Jr. (c. 1743–1822), and Matthew Pratt (1734–1805).

He served as High Sheriff of Philadelphia from 1777 to 1780.

He was commissioned and paid $8 by Captain Abram Markoe in 1775 to paint a flag for the Philadelphia Troop of Light Horse.

== Marriages and children ==
He married Rebecca White (c.1721–1749) on May 24, 1742, at Christ Church, Philadelphia. He had three children from this marriage:

- James Claypoole Jr., (c.1743–1822);
- Joseph Claypoole (c.1745-?); and,
- Mary Claypoole, (1746–1746).

After Rebecca's death on July 19, 1749 he married Mary Chambers (d. 1796) in September 1750 and had nine children with her:

- Elizabeth Claypoole Copper Matlack, (1751-ca 1820); She first married Norris Copper and second Timothy Matlack
- Mary Claypoole Peale (1753–1829); married James Peale younger brother to Charles Willson Peale
- Abraham George Claypoole, (c.1754–1827);
- David Chambers Claypoole, (1757–1849);
- Temperance Claypoole, (1759-c.1815);
- Helen Claypoole (?-?);
- Rebecca Claypoole, (?-?);
- Hester Claypoole Allen, (1763-?); and, she married Joseph Allen
- Septimus Claypoole, (1764–1798).

He was father-in-law to both the miniature portraitist James Peale and Col. Timothy Matlack (1730–1829), a Free Quaker, merchant, surveyor, architect, statesman, and patriot in the American Revolution.

== Death ==
James Claypoole Sr. died on September 21, 1784, in Philadelphia, Pennsylvania, and is interred at Old Saint Paul's Episcopal Church Cemetery, in Philadelphia, Pennsylvania.

A portrait of him by James Peale and/or Charles Willson Peale is in the Pennsylvania Academy of the Fine Arts, Philadelphia, Pennsylvania. A pair of portraits by his son, James Claypoole Jr., depict Mr. and Mrs. James Pemberton (c.1767) and are also owned by the Pennsylvania Academy of the Fine arts.
