= Portrait of Jeffery Amherst (Gainsborough) =

Painting by Thomas Gainsborough

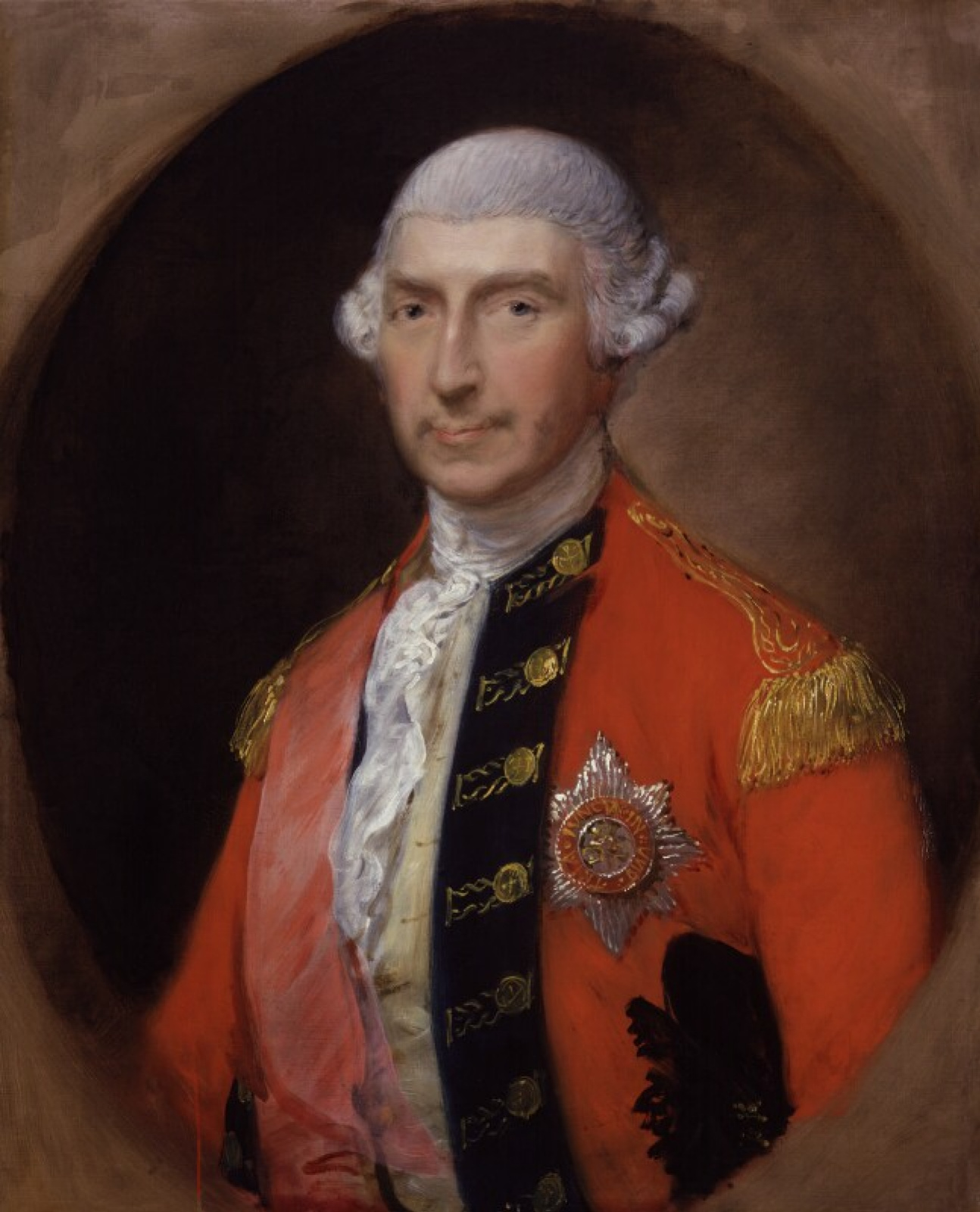
- Artist: Thomas Gainsborough
- Year: 1780
- Type: Oil on canvas, portrait painting
- Dimensions: 76 cm × 63.1 cm (30 in × 24.8 in)
- Location: National Portrait Gallery; London

Portrait of Jeffery Amherst is an oil on canvas portrait painting by the English artist Thomas Gainsborough, from 1780. It depicts the British general Jeffery Amherst, 1st Baron Amherst. Amherst was noted for his role in the Conquest of Canada during the Seven Years' War, particularly for the Montreal campaign of 1760 that led to the final defeat of New France. At the time of the painting he was Commander in Chief of the British Army during the American War of Independence. The previous year he had overseen the response to a threatened Franco-Spanish invasion during the Armada of 1779.

Today the original work is in Mead Art Museum, at Amherst College, while another version is at the National Portrait Gallery in London, having been acquired in 1862.

== See also ==
- Portrait of Jeffery Amherst (Reynolds), a 1765 painting by Joshua Reynolds

== Bibliography ==
- Ingamells, John. National Portrait Gallery Mid-Georgian Portraits, 1760–1790. National Portrait Gallery, 2004
- Lustig, Mary Lou. Privilege and Prerogative: New York's Provincial Elite, 1710-1776. Fairleigh Dickinson Press, 1995.
