= The Meeting of Dido and Aeneas =

1766 painting by Nathaniel Dance-Holland

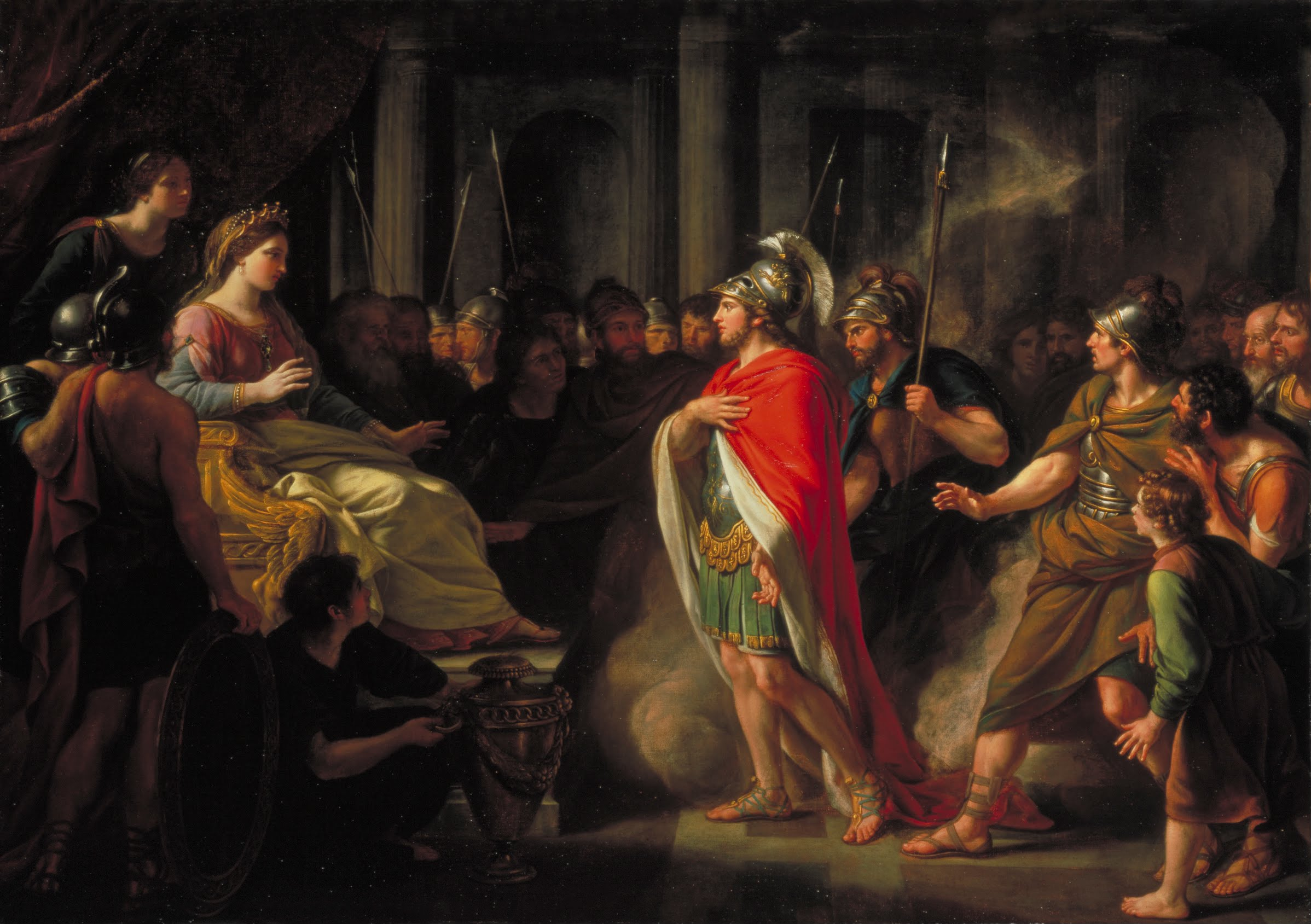
- Artist: Nathaniel Dance-Holland
- Year: 1766
- Type: Oil on canvas, history painting
- Dimensions: 124 cm × 174 cm (49 in × 69 in)
- Location: Tate Britain, London

The Meeting of Dido and Aeneas is an oil on canvas neoclassical history painting by the British artist Nathaniel Dance-Holland, from 1766.

== History and description ==
It portrays the mythical meeting between Dido, Queen of Carthage, and the Trojan Aeneas, inspired by the Aeneid by the Roman poet Virgil.

Primarily known as a portrait painter, Dance-Holland spent the years from 1754 in Italy. The work was commissioned by Lord Grey and produced in Rome. Dance-Holland displayed it at the Exhibition of 1766 at the Society of Artists of Great Britain at Spring Gardens in London. He likely sent it ahead to raise interest about his forthcoming return to Britain. The painting is now in the collection of the Tate Britain, having been purchased with the assistance of the Art Fund in 1993.

== Bibliography ==
- Lyles, Anne & Hamlyn, Robin. British Watercolours from the Oppé Collection. Tate Gallery Publishing, 1997.
- Myrone, Martin. Bodybuilding: Reforming Masculinities in British Art 1750-1810. Yale University Press, 2005.
- Wright, Christopher, Gordon, Catherine May & Smith, Mary Peskett. British and Irish Paintings in Public Collections: An Index of British and Irish Oil Paintings by Artists Born Before 1870 in Public and Institutional Collections in the United Kingdom and Ireland. Yale University Press, 2006.
