= Matthew Pratt =

American painter (1734–1805)

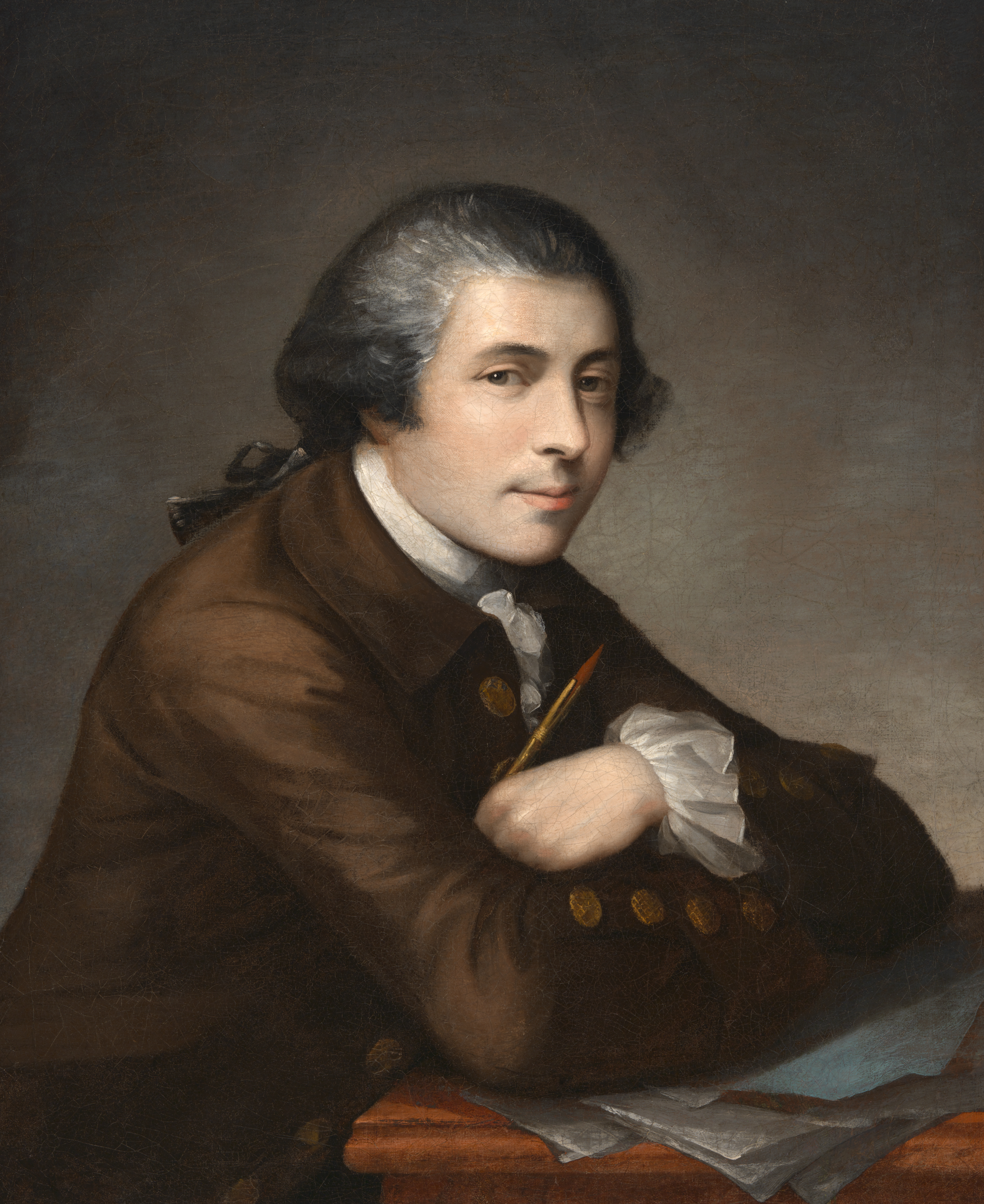
1764 self-portrait of Pratt

Matthew Pratt (September 23, 1734 – January 9, 1805) was an American "Colonial Era" artist famous for his portraits of American men and women.

== Early life ==
He was born in Philadelphia, Province of Pennsylvania, to goldsmith Henry Pratt and Rebecca Claypoole (sister of James Claypoole Sr.). He was the second of eight children born to the Pratts.

== Apprenticeship ==
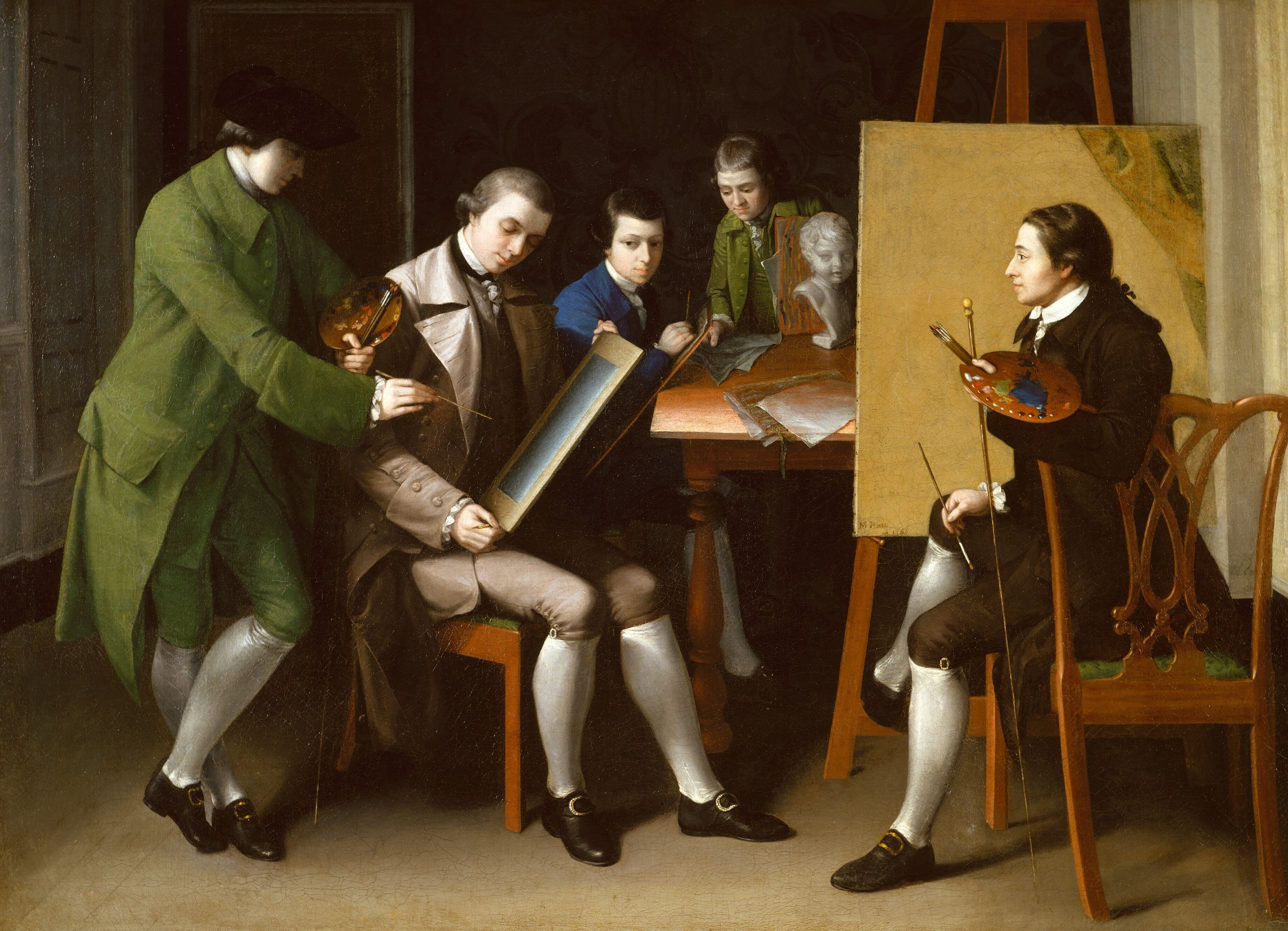
The American School (1765)

He was apprenticed to his uncle, artist James Claypoole (a limner and painter) from 1745 to 1755. He learned different aspects of portrait painting (including business acumen) from Claypoole. In 1764 he escorted his cousin, Betsey Shewell to England for her marriage to the American "expatriate" artist Benjamin West. West was gaining a distinguished reputation in England. Pratt stayed on in England for two and a half years as a pupil and colleague to West. It was during this time that he painted one of his best known works The American School.

== Back in America ==
In March 1768 he returned to America. Charles Willson Peale stated that at that time Matthew Pratt had a full-length portrait of John Dickinson and a considerable number of other works in progress. It was there that he met John Singleton Copley.

== Marriage and children ==
In 1760 he married Elizabeth Moore. Their children were:

- Henry Charles Pratt (May 14, 1761 – 1838);
- Charles Pratt, (September 10, 1763 – August 27, 1764);
- Charles Pratt, (February 18, 1769 – August 13, 1770);
- Mary Pratt, (July 20, 1771-?);
- Thomas Phyle Pratt, (October 1, 1773 – April 12, 1869)
- Elizabeth "Eliza" (née Pratt) Kugler, (August 2, 1776-?).

== Later life ==
Pratt announced that he was recently returned from England and Ireland and also New York. He died in Philadelphia, Pennsylvania on January 9, 1805.

== Oil paintings – portraits ==
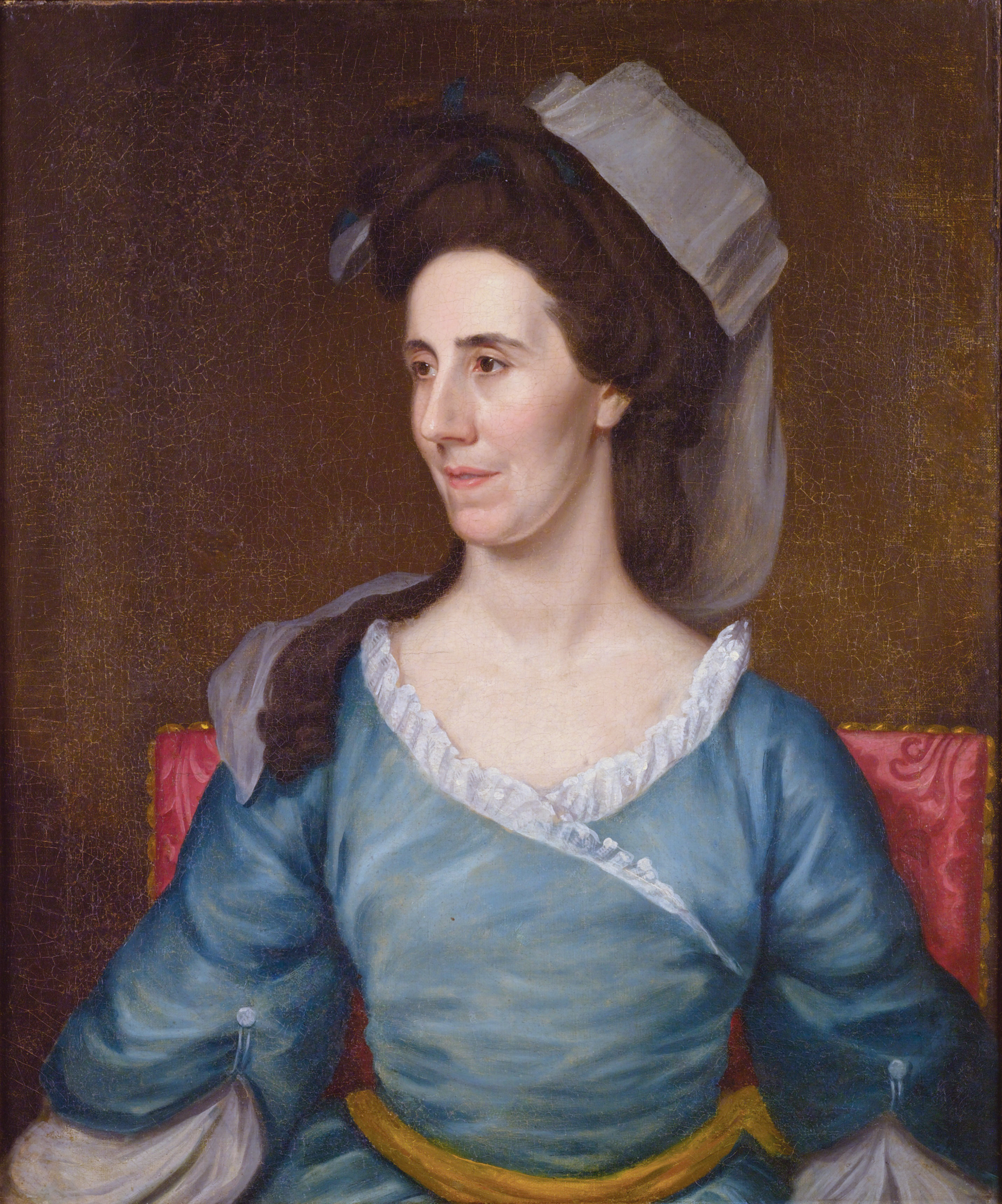
Hannah Stockton Boudinot (1736–1808), by Matthew Pratt

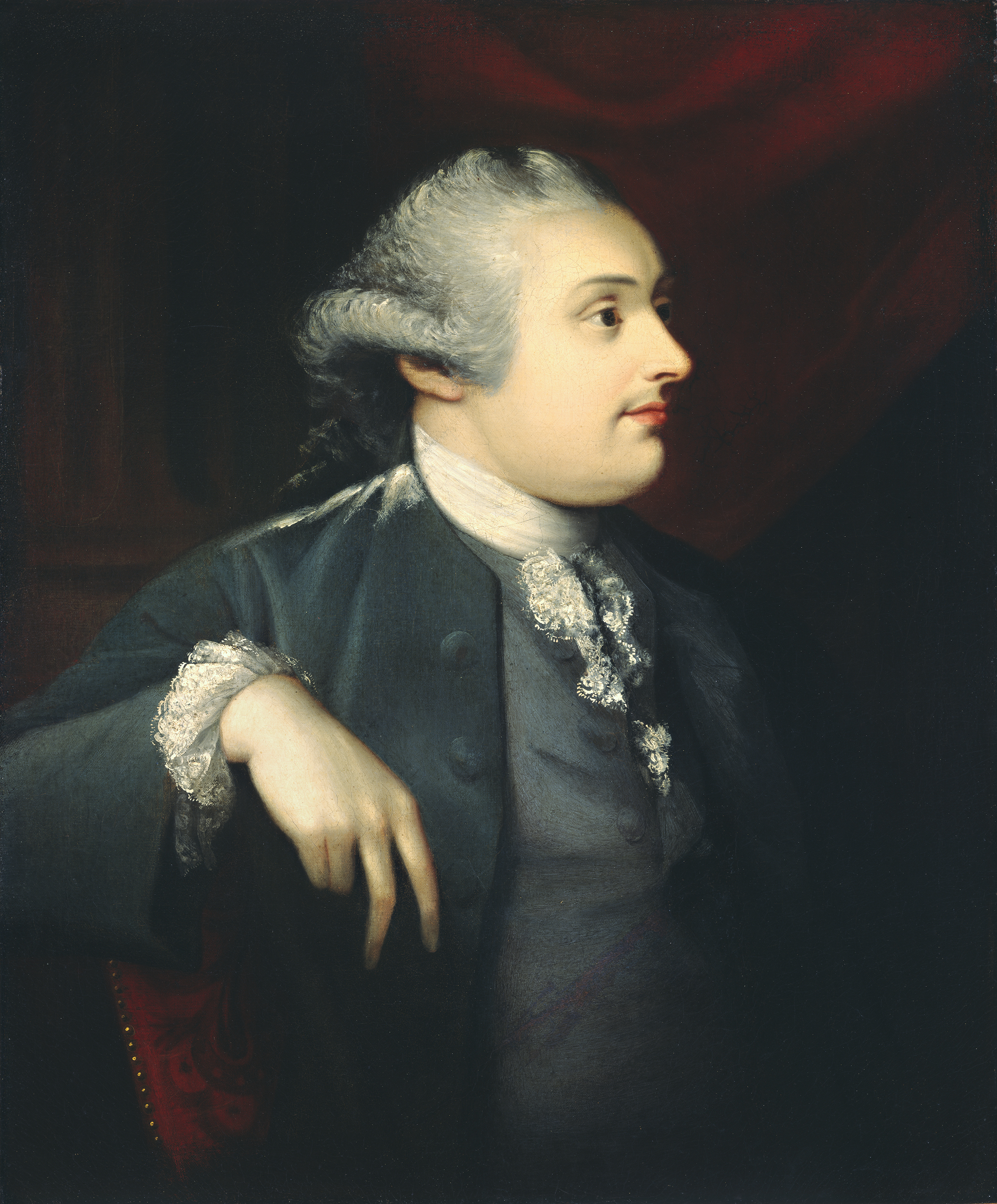
William Henry Cavendish-Bentinck, 3rd Duke of Portland

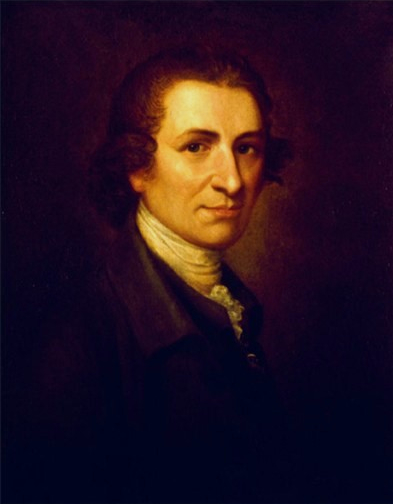
Thomas Paine by Matthew Pratt

- The American School – (1765) oil on canvas 36" x 50 1/4" this painting depicts a group of five artists/painters in the London studio of artist Benjamin West at the Metropolitan Museum of Art
- Mrs. Elias Boudinot – (1740–1821) oil on canvas
- Cadwallader Colden and His Grandson Warren De Lancey – (1772) oil on canvas 50" x 40" at the Metropolitan Museum of Art
- Reynold Keen (1769) oil on canvas 30" x 25" at the Metropolitan Museum of Art
- Mrs. Peter De Lancey (1771) oil on canvas 29 3/4" x 25" at the Metropolitan Museum of Art
- Christiana Stille Keen (1769) oil on canvas 30" x 25" at the Metropolitan Museum of Art
- Abigail Willing
- Madonna of Saint Jerome (1764) oil on canvas 30 9/16" x 23 9/16" at the National Gallery of Art
- William Henry Cavendish-Bentinck, 3rd Duke of Portland (1774) oil on canvas 30 1/6" x 24 7/8" at the National Gallery of Art
- Benjamin West (1765) oil on canvas at the Pennsylvania Academy of Fine Arts
- Mrs. Benjamin West (1765) oil on canvas at the Pennsylvania Academy of Fine Arts
- James McCulloch (1773) oil on canvas at Princeton University Art Museum
- Mrs. John Langdale (née Alice Coates) (1760) oil on canvas at the Yale University Art Gallery
- Hugh McCullough (1773) oil on canvas 50 1/8" x 40 1/16"
- Benjamin Nicholson (1772) oil on canvas 29 5/8" x 24 3/4" owned by the New York Historical Society
- Captain John Barry (1776) oil on canvas 29 3/4" x 25" at University of Rochester Memorial Art Gallery
- Dr. William Bryant (1770) oil on canvas
- Vincent Loockerman oil on canvas
- Mrs. James Van Rensselaer (née Catherine Van Cortlandt) oil on canvas
- Elizabeth Willing Powel (1800) oil on canvas
- John Swanwick (1800) oil on canvas

== Miniature portraits ==
- T. Matthew Pratt (1790) watercolor on ivory 2 9/16" x 2 1/16" at the Metropolitan Museum of Art
- Mrs. William Williamson (née Elizabeth Ann Timothy) (1775) watercolor and gouache on ivory 1 7/16" x 1 3/16" at the Metropolitan Museum of Art
- Mrs. Clark (1770) watercolor on ivory 1 5/8" x 1 5/16" at the Metropolitan Museum of Art

== Museums and public galleries ==
The following galleries have works by Matthew Pratt:

- The Metropolitan Museum of Art
- The National Gallery of Art
- Memorial Art Gallery of the University of Rochester
- National Portrait Gallery Washington D.C.
- Pennsylvania Academy of the Fine Arts
- Princeton University Art Museum
