= Jakob Felsing =

German line-engraver

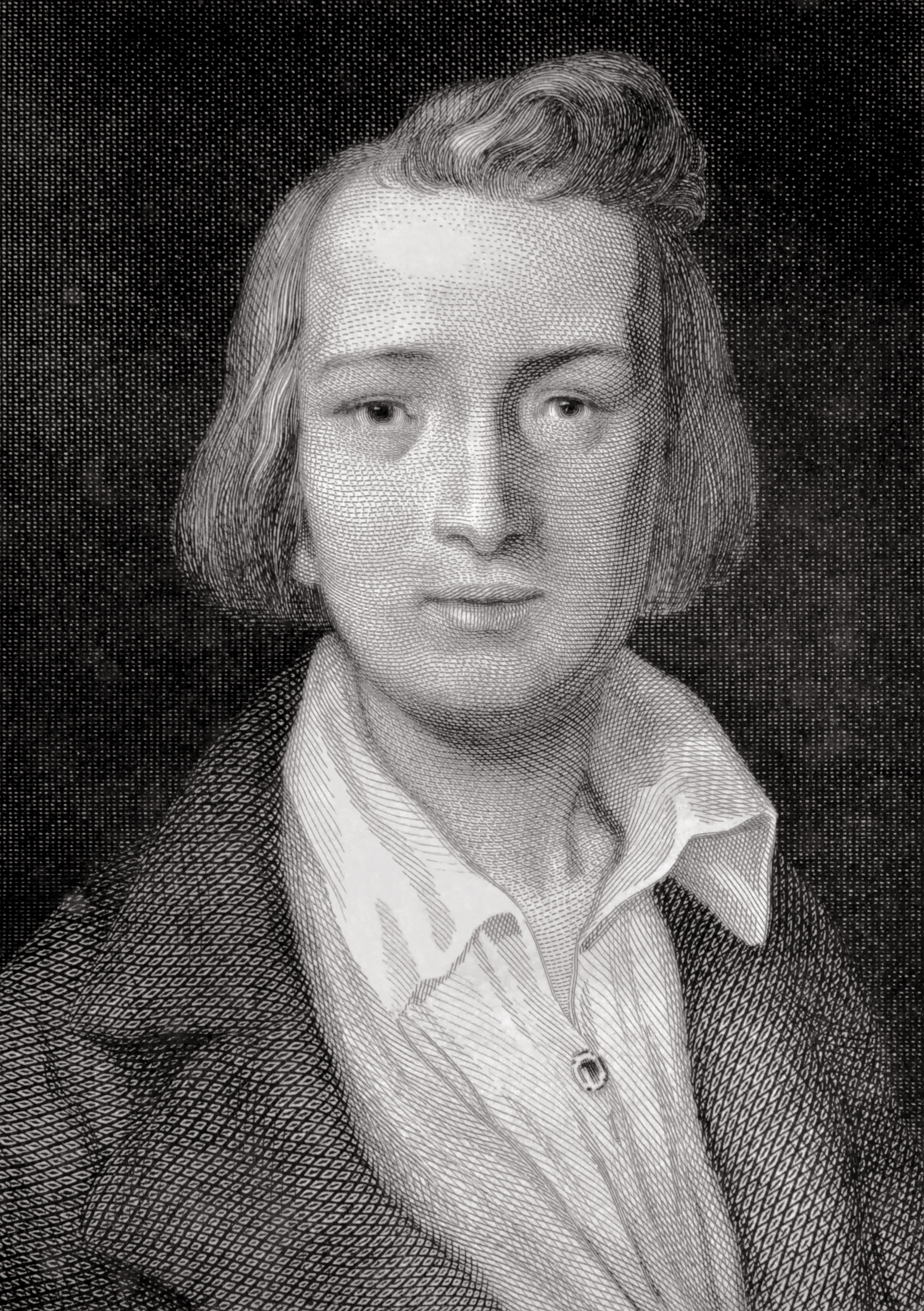
Heinrich Heine, 1837, drawing by Tony Johannot, engraving by Felsing

Georg Jakob Felsing (22 July 1802, Darmstadt - 9 June 1883, Darmstadt) was a German line-engraver.

== Life and work ==
He was born at Darmstadt in 1802 and was first instructed by his father, Johann Conrad Felsing. Afterwards, he visited Italy and studied at Milan under Longhi, and at Florence the style of Raffaello Morghen. After residing some time at Naples he revisited Florence, and became a professor in the Academy of that city, and a member of the Academy of Milan. He returned to Darmstadt in 1832, when he was elected professor, and appointed engraver to the Court. During a stay in Paris he was influenced by the style of Desnoyers, and at Munich by the principles of the artists there. Felsing's plates show the talent of a great artist, and he worked with the graver in a clear and vigorous manner. He was also a member of the Academies of St. Petersburg, Berlin, and Vienna, and of the Institute of France. He died at Darmstadt in 1883. His most important works are:

- Christ on the Mount of Olives; after Carlo Dolci. 1828.
- The Madonna enthroned; after Andrea del Sarto. 1830.
- The Marriage of St. Catharine; after Correggio. 1831.
- The Violinist; after Raphael. 1833.
- Girl at the Fountain; after Bendemann. 1835.
- The Virgin with the Infant, St. Elizabeth, and St. John; after Overbeck. 1839.
- St. Genevieve in the Forest; after Steinbrück.
- The Saviour; after Leonardo da Vinci. 1844.
- Christ with the Doctors; after the same. 1847.
- Hagar and Ishmael; after Köhler. 1848.
- Moses in the Bulrushes; after the same. 1849–52.
- The Lorelei; after Kohler the younger. 1854.
- The Betrayal of Christ; after Hofmann. 1861.
- St. Cecilia; after the same.
- Christ with the Cross; after Crespi.
