= Samuel Drummond =

British painter (1766–1844)

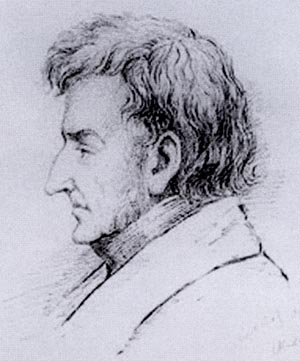
- Born: 25 December 1766; London, England
- Died: 6 August 1844 (aged 77); London, England
- Known for: Portrait painting, Marine art

Samuel Drummond ARA (25 December 1766 – 6 August 1844) was a British painter, especially prolific in portrait and marine genre painting. His works are on display in the National Portrait Gallery, the National Maritime Museum and the Walker Art Gallery.

== Life ==
Drummond was born and died in London, and was the son of Jane Bicknell and James Drummond, a baker. At about thirteen Drummond was apprenticed to the sea service, working on the Baltic trade routes for six or seven years. After the navy, Drummond worked briefly as a clerk before entering the Royal Academy Schools on 15 July 1791. Drummond started his portraying with crayons and oil and within several years exhibited over three hundred pictures at the Royal Academy. In 1808 he was elected an associate of the Royal Academy.

Among Drummond's sitters were Walter Scott, Francis Place, Elizabeth Fry and Marc Isambard Brunel. He also painted such persons as Admiral Edward Pellew, Captain William Rogers and Rear-Admiral William Edward Parry. After 1800, Drummond started large oil paintings on maritime history of the United Kingdom (The Battle of the Nile, 1st August 1798, Captain William Rogers Capturing the Jeune Richard, 1 October 1807, Admiral Duncan at the Battle of Camperdown, 11 October 1797 (1827) and a series of paintings on the death of Horatio Nelson.

For some time Drummond was employed by The European Magazine and London Review to make portraits of leading personalities of the day. Among the portraits published in The European Magazine were those of Lord Gerald Lake, Sir John Soane and Friedrich Accum.

Towards the end of his life, despite continuing his craft, Drummond struggled financially and was frequently supported by the funds of the Royal Academy. Nearly all Drummond's children from his three marriages became artists (five daughters and one son): Rose Emma from the first, Ellen, Eliza Ann and Jane from the second to Rose Hudson and Rosa Myra and Julian from the third one.

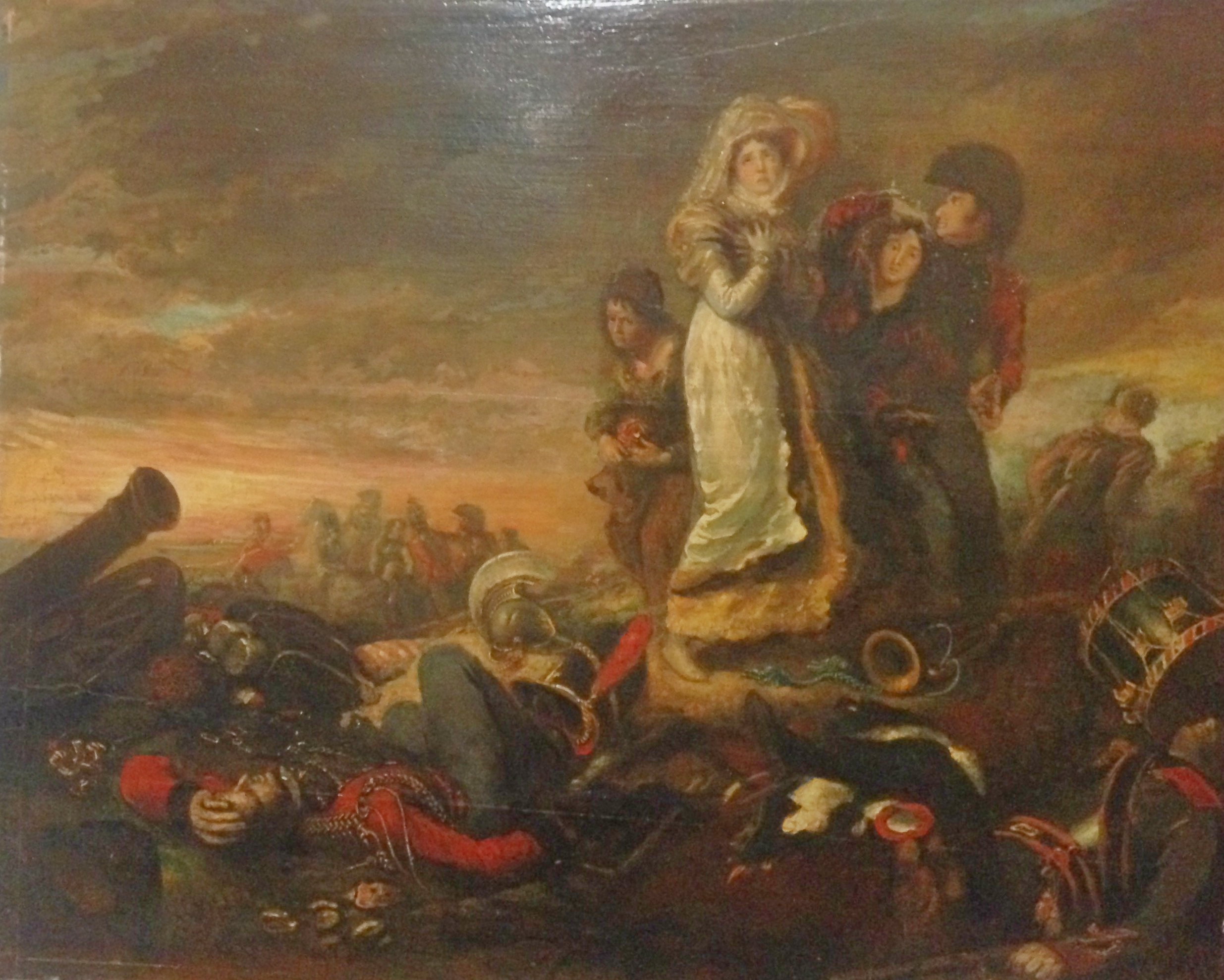
After Waterloo by Samuel Drummond
