= Johann Conrad Felsing =

German engraver

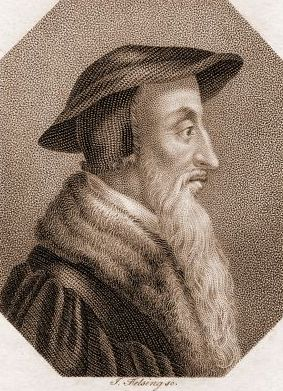
John Calvin, dotted engraving by Felsing

Johann Conrad Felsing (1 March 1766 – 3 December 1819) was a German engraver.

Felsing was born at Giessen in 1766, and learned the elements of his art in Darmstadt. He engraved many portraits in the dotted manner, but was more particularly distinguished by his topographical works, of which the last and best was the military plan of Mayence of 1815. He died at Darmstadt in 1819. He was the father of Johann Heinrich Felsing, a celebrated copper-plate printer, who died in 1875, and of Georg Jakob Felsing, the eminent engraver.
