= On the Scheldt near Leiskenshoeck =

Painting by Clarkson Stanfield

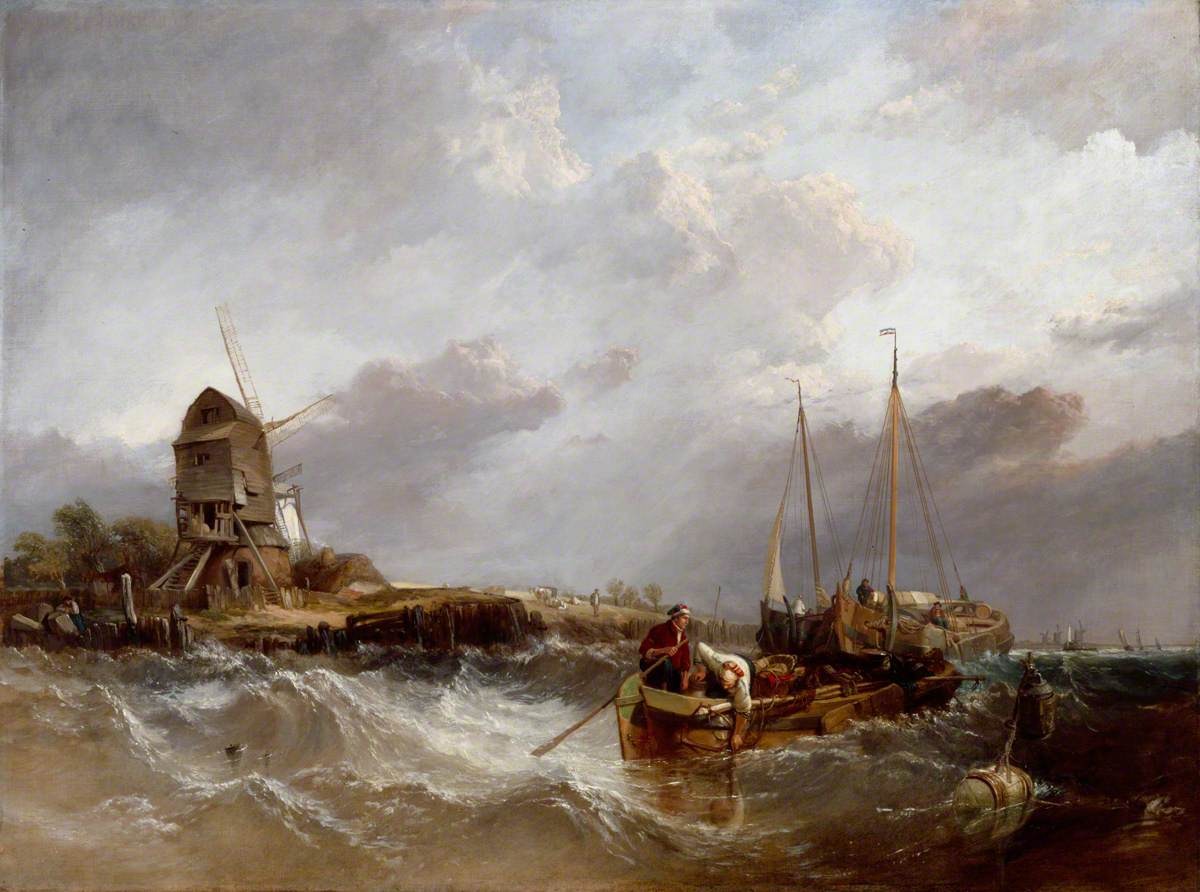
- Artist: Clarkson Stanfield
- Year: 1837
- Medium: Oil on canvas, landscape painting
- Dimensions: 96.9 cm × 130.2 cm (38.1 in × 51.3 in)
- Location: Royal Academy of Arts, London

On the Scheldt near Leiskenshoeck is an 1837 oil painting by the British artist Clarkson Stanfield. A seascape it depicts a view of the River Scheldt close to Antwerp in Belgium on a windy day. A former sailor, Stanfield made his name as a scenic designer at the Theatre Royal, Drury Lane before he enjoyed great success with his maritime paintings beginning with Mount St Michael in 1830. He produced a number of works featuring the river, including A Market Boat on the Scheldt in 1826.

The painting was displayed at the Royal Academy Exhibition of 1837 at the National Gallery in Trafalgar Square in London. As Stanfield had recently been elected as a full member of the Royal Academy, he presented the work to the Academy as his Diploma Work

== Bibliography ==
- Bury, Stephen (ed.) Benezit Dictionary of British Graphic Artists and Illustrators, Volume 1. OUP, 2012.
- Maas, Jeremy. Victorian Painters. Barrie & Jenkins, 1978.
- Van der Merwe, Pieter & Took, Roger. The Spectacular career of Clarkson Stanfield. Tyne and Wear County Council Museums, 1979.
