= Stanfield House =

Building in Hampstead, London

Coordinates: 51°33′19″N 0°10′33″W

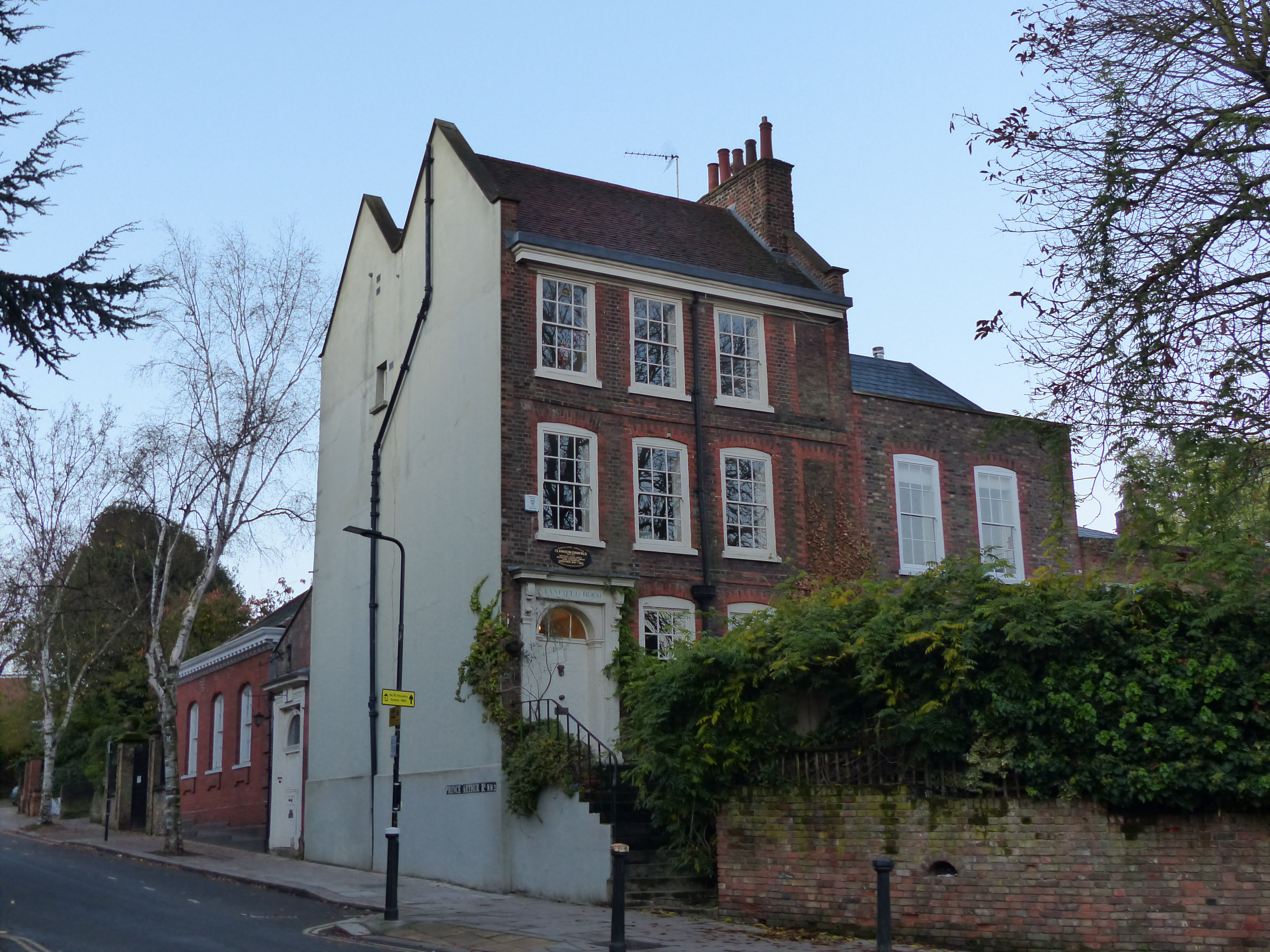
Stanfield House in 2020

Stanfield House is a Grade II* listed building in Hampstead, London, England. Located at the junction of Hampstead High Street and Prince Arthur Road, the original building dates to around 1730.

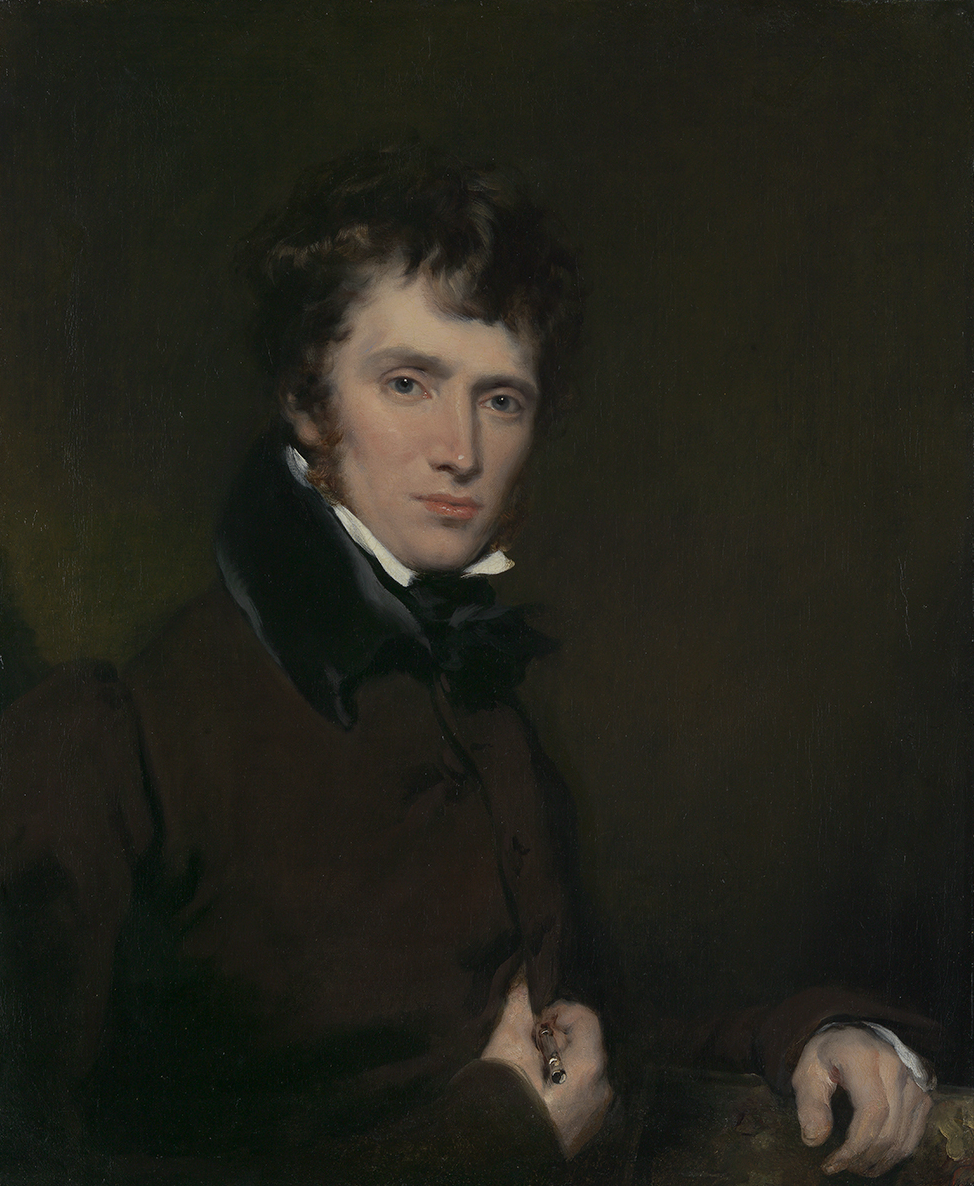
Portrait of Clarkson Stanfield by John Simpson

The building takes its name from the Victorian artist Clarkson Stanfield, a noted painter of Romantic seascapes. Stanfield was a close friend of the author Charles Dickens, who visited Stanfield there. Stanfield lived there from 1847 to 1865 before moving to nearby Belsize Park.

Later in the nineteenth century the lower floor served as a public library. The house was significantly truncated to make room for the construction of Prince Arthur Road in the late 1860s. Around 1940 the artist Walter Bayes produced a watercolour depiction of the house, which is now in the Victoria and Albert Museum.

Stanfield House has been a listed building since 1950, with its status last amended in 1999.

== Bibliography ==
- Bard, Robert. Hampstead & Highgate Through Time. Amberley Publishing, 2015.
- Cherry, Bridget & Pevsner, Nikolaus. London 4: North. Yale University Press, 2002.
- Van der Merwe, Pieter & Took, Roger. The Spectacular career of Clarkson Stanfield. Tyne and Wear County Council Museums, 1979.
- Wade, Christopher. The Streets of Hampstead. Camden History Society, 2000.
- Weinreb, Ben, Hibbert, Christopher, Keay, John & Keay, Julia. The London Encyclopaedia. Macmillan, 2010.
