= James Field Stanfield =

Irish actor, abolitionist and author (1749–1824)

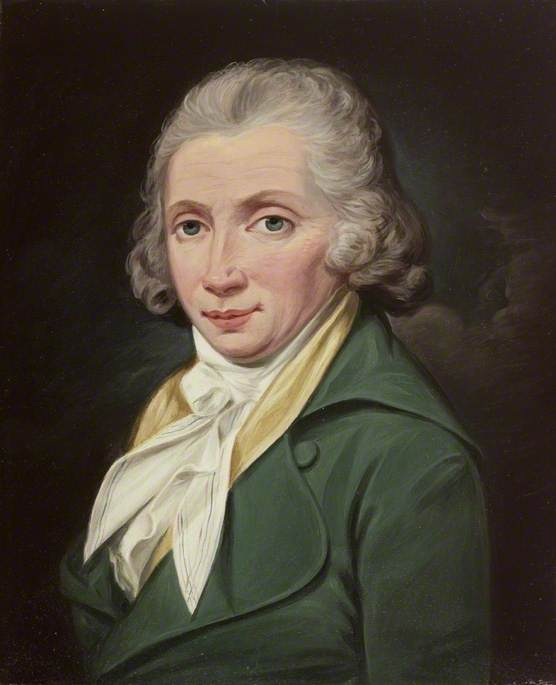
- Born: 1749; Ireland
- Died: 10 May 1824 (aged 74–75); London, England
- Occupations: Actor; activist; author
- Spouses: Mary Hoad (m. 1785; died 1801) Mana Field Kell (m. 1801)
- Children: Clarkson Frederick Stanfield
- Relatives: George Clarkson Stanfield (grandson); Francis Stanfield (grandson)

James Field Stanfield (1749 – 10 May 1824) was an Irish actor, abolitionist and author. He was the father of the English painter Clarkson Stanfield.

== Early life ==
Stanfield was educated in France for the Roman Catholic priesthood. He did not take orders, but went to sea in a vessel engaged in the Atlantic slave trade. After a bad time at sea and a short period on shore in Africa, he returned to England, one out of three survivors of the voyage.

Joining a theatrical company, Stanfield appeared in 1786 at York, where he also tried his hand at writing a comic opera. Joining the abolitionists, he found friends including Thomas Clarkson. For several years he held a principal situation in the Scarborough Theatre, and he afterwards had the direction of a small company whose circuit (about 1812) was in the north of Yorkshire and some of the adjoining counties.

On 13 June 1793 James Field Stanfield joined the Sea Captain Lodge, Sunderland, which later became Palatine Lodge No. 97.

== Personal life and death ==
Stanfield married his first wife, Mary Hoad of Cheltenham on 25 October 1785, who died in 1801. Together the couple had Clarkson Frederick Stanfield. He married Mana Field Kell on 29 October 1801.

He died on 10 May 1824 in London, aged 74.

== Works ==
In 1788 Stanfield published an account of his experience of the slave trade in Observations on a Guinea Voyage in a series of letters addressed to the Rev. Thomas Clarkson, and in the following year a poem, The Guinea Voyage (London). In 1807 both works were published at Edinburgh in one volume. In 1813 he published an Essay on the Study and Composition of Biography (Sunderland), insisting on the need of "moral illustration".
