= Shakespeare Cliff, Dover, 1849 =

Painting by Clarkson Stanfield

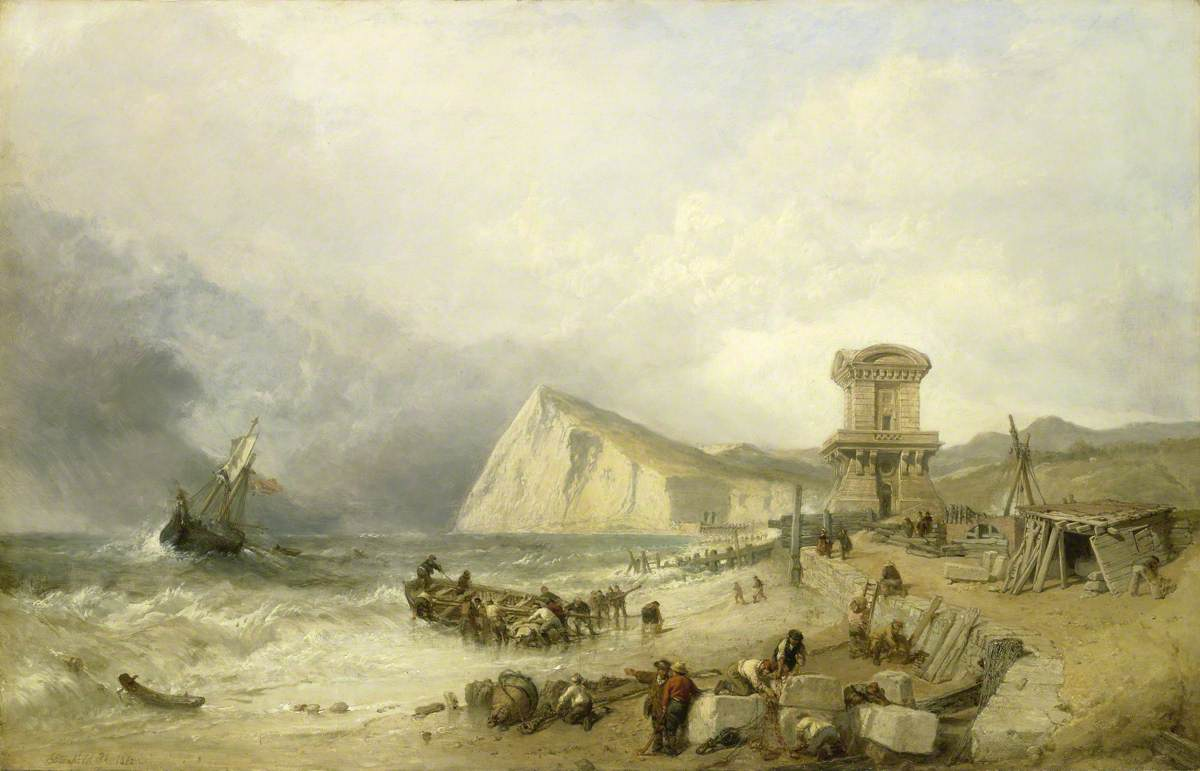
- Artist: Clarkson Stanfield
- Year: 1862
- Type: Oil on canvas, landscape painting
- Dimensions: 68.4 cm × 91.4 cm (26.9 in × 36.0 in)
- Location: National Maritime Museum, London

Shakespeare Cliff, Dover, 1849 is an 1862 landscape painting by the British artist Clarkson Stanfield. It depicts a view of Shakespeare Cliff near Dover on the coast of Kent. It depicts a scene of how the coast looked thirteen years earlier and portrays construction underway on the Admiralty Pier. Dominating the background is the cliff, named after a passage from Shakespeare's King Lear. At the base are the two tunnels that carry the railway of the recently opened South Eastern Main Line. It has been described as celebrating the advance of industrial progress during the Victorian era, particularly significant in Dover with its close connection with Continental Europe.

It was one of the later works of Stanfield, a former sailor who had originally worked as a scenic designer at Drury Lane before enjoying success with his seascapes. The painting was displayed the Royal Academy's Summer Exhibition of 1863 at the National Gallery in London. Today it is part of the collection of the National Maritime Museum in Greenwich. A smaller, earlier work The Seashore at Dover has a similar composition and is in the collection of the Victoria and Albert Museum in South Kensington.

== Bibliography ==
- Van der Merwe, Pieter & Took, Roger. The Spectacular career of Clarkson Stanfield. Tyne and Wear County Council Museums, 1979.
