= French Troops Fording the Magra =

Painting by Clarkson Stanfield

- Artist: Clarkson Frederick Stanfield
- Year: 1847
- Type: Oil on canvas, landscape painting
- Dimensions: 152 cm × 231 cm (60 in × 91 in)
- Location: Louvre; Paris

French Troops Fording the Magra (French: Les Troupes françaises franchissant la Margra) is an oil on canvas painting by the British artist Clarkson Frederick Stanfield, from 1847.

== History and description ==
Combining elements of landscape and history painting. It depicts forces of the French Republic crossing the River Magra near Sarzana in 1796 during Napoleon Bonaparte's Italian Campaign of the French Revolutionary Wars. The majestic mountains are seen in the background.

The picture was possibly commissioned by George Egerton, 2nd Earl of Ellesmere. The painting was displayed at the Royal Academy Exhibition of 1847 at the National Gallery in London. It was subsequently also exhibited at the Salon of 1855 in Paris and at the Manchester Art Treasures Exhibition in 1857. It is today in the collection of the Louvre in Paris, having been acquired.

A preparatory oil sketch for the painting is now in the York Art Gallery, in England.

== Bibliography ==
- Pergam, Elizabeth A. The Manchester Art Treasures Exhibition of 1857. Routledge, 2017.
- Van der Merwe, Pieter & Took, Roger. The Spectacular career of Clarkson Stanfield. Tyne and Wear County Council Museums, 1979.
