= Venice from the Dogana =

Painting by Clarkson Stanfield

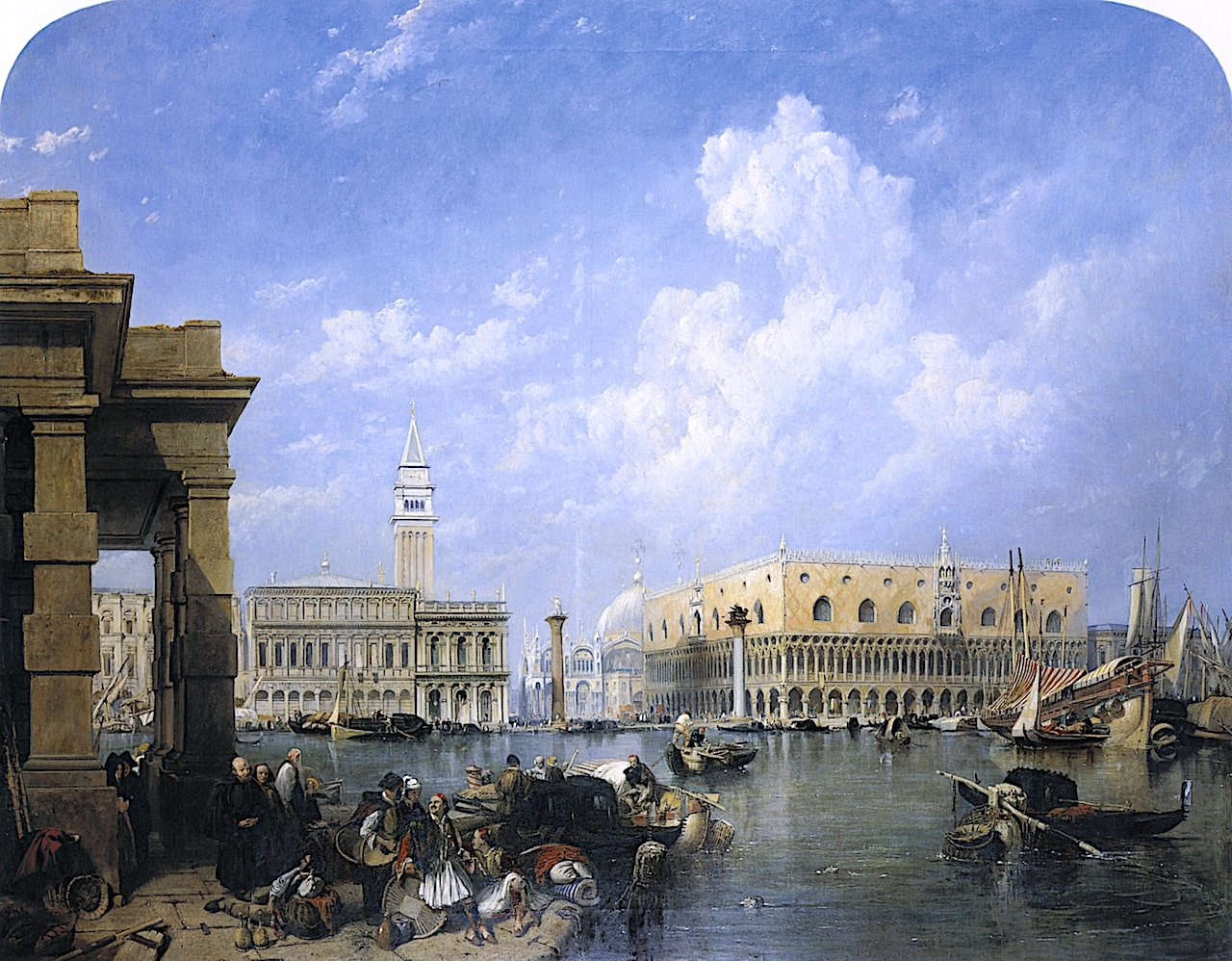
- Artist: Clarkson Stanfield
- Year: 1833
- Medium: Oil on canvas, landscape painting
- Dimensions: 130 cm × 166.5 cm (51 in × 65.6 in)
- Location: Bowood House; Wiltshire

Venice from the Dogana is an 1833 landscape painting by the British artist Clarkson Stanfield depicting the Grand Canal of Venice in Italy, seen from the Dogana da Mar. Venice, at the time part of the Austrian Empire, was a popular subject for British artists during the period. Stanfield a former sailor was noted for his romantic seascapes. He had worked as a scenic designer at Drury Lane and became known for his later association with Charles Dickens.

The painting was displayed at the Royal Academy Exhibition of 1833 at Somerset House. The picture drew comparisons to J.M. W. Turner's submission to the exhibition Bridge of Sighs, Ducal Palace and Custom-House, Venice: Canaletti Painting which featured a near identical view. The two artists were friends even though critics often contrasted their work as those of rivals. Turner may have been trying to emphasise his style as distinct from the more precise manner of the younger Stanfield.

The painting was commissioned by the Whig politician the Marquess of Lansdowne for his country estate Bowood House in Wiltshire.

== Bibliography ==
- Costello, Leo. J.M.W. Turner and the Subject of History. Routledge, 2017.
- Halsby, Julian. Venice: The Artist's Vision : a Guide to British and American Painters. Unicorn, 1999.
- Van der Merwe, Pieter & Took, Roger. The Spectacular career of Clarkson Stanfield. Tyne and Wear County Council Museums, 1979.
