= Portrait of Clarkson Stanfield =

Painting by John Simpson

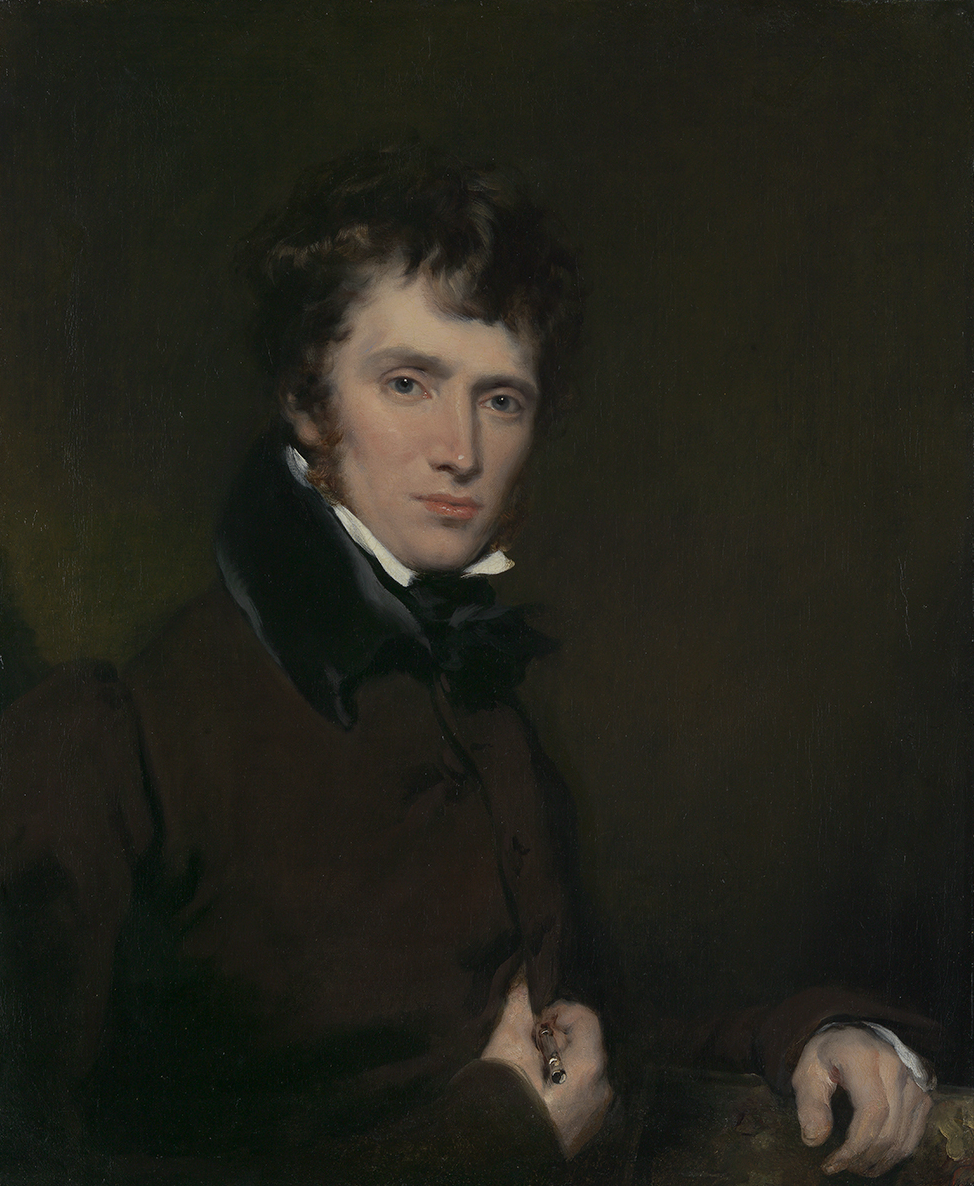
- Artist: John Simpson
- Year: 1829
- Type: Oil on canvas, portrait painting
- Dimensions: 76 cm × 63.5 cm (30 in × 25.0 in)
- Location: National Maritime Museum, Greenwich

Portrait of Clarkson Stanfield is an 1829 portrait painting by the British artist John Simpson depicting his fellow painter Clarkson Stanfield. Stanfield, a former sailor, was noted for his maritime paintings. The following year he enjoyed his breakthrough with Mount St Michael, Cornwall leading to commissions from William IV. Before this he has been known for his set designs at the Theatre Royal, Drury Lane.

Simpson had been a pupil of Thomas Lawrence, the leading British portraitist of the Regency era, and was a friend or Stanfield. The painting was commissioned by the politician and art collector George Watson-Taylor. The work was displayed at the Royal Academy Exhibition of 1830 at Somerset House. Today the painting is in the collection of the National Maritime Museum in Greenwich. Simpson produced two other portraits of Stanfield, one of which is now in the National Portrait Gallery. In 1834 the engraver William Say produced a mezzotint based on this version.

== Bibliography ==
- Ormond, Richard. Early Victorian Portraits: Text. H.M. Stationery Office, 1974.
- Van der Merwe, Pieter & Took, Roger. The Spectacular career of Clarkson Stanfield. Tyne and Wear County Council Museums, 1979.
