= Clarkson Frederick Stanfield =

English painter (1793–1867)

Clarkson Frederick Stanfield RA RBA
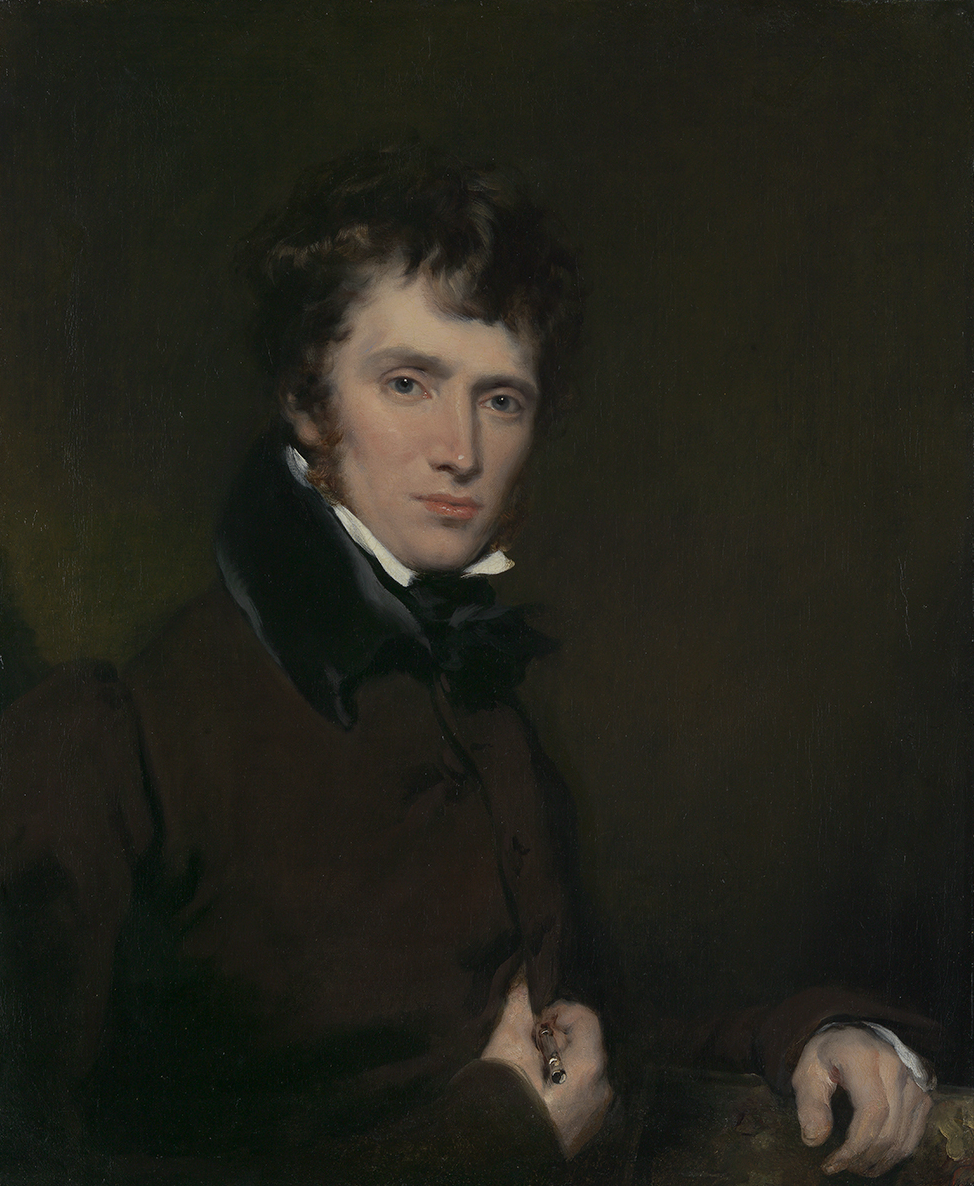
- Portrait of Clarkson Stanfield by John Simpson, 1829
- Born: 3 December 1793; Sunderland, County Durham, England
- Died: 18 May 1867 (aged 73); Hampstead, London, England
- Resting place: Kensal Green Catholic Cemetery
- Spouses: Mary Hutchinson; Rebecca Adcock
- Children: George Clarkson Stanfield; Francis Stanfield
- Parent: James Field Stanfield (father)
- Military career
- Allegiance: United Kingdom
- Branch: Royal Navy
- Service years: 1808–1814

Clarkson Frederick Stanfield RA RBA (3 December 1793 – 18 May 1867) was an English artist best known for his large-scale paintings of marine art and landscapes. A former sailor he became celebrated for his Romantic seascapes. Like his friend and colleague David Roberts he initially achieved recognition for his role as a scenic designer working at the Theatre Royal, Drury Lane during the Regency era.

Stanfield is noted for his close friendship with fellow artists of the Royal Academy Roberts, Edwin Landseer and Daniel Maclise as well as the writer Charles Dickens, with whom he often collaborated. He was widely known as Stanny to his friends and colleagues. He was the father of the painter George Clarkson Stanfield and the composer Francis Stanfield.

== Early life ==
Stanfield was born in the port town of Sunderland in County Durham, the son of James Field Stanfield (1749–1824) an Irish author, actor and former seaman, and Mary Hoad, an artist and actress. Stanfield was likely to have inherited artistic talent from his mother, who is said to have been an accomplished artist, but died in 1801. His father remarried, to Maria Kell, a year later. Stanfield was named after Thomas Clarkson, the slave trade abolitionist, whom his father knew, and this was the only forename he used, although there is reason to believe Frederick was a second one.

He was briefly apprenticed to a coach decorator in 1806, but left owing to the drunkenness of his master's wife and joined a South Shields collier to become a sailor. In 1808 he was pressed into the Royal Navy, serving in the guardship HMS Namur at Sheerness. Discharged on health grounds in 1814, he then made a voyage to China in 1815 on the East Indiaman Warley and returned with many sketches.

== Scene designer ==
An accident forced Stanfield to leave active service, but during his voyages he had acquired considerable skill as a draughtsman. In August 1816 Stanfield was engaged as a decorator and scene-painter at the Royalty Theatre in Wellclose Square, London. Along with David Roberts he was afterwards employed at the Coburg Theatre in Lambeth, and in 1823 he became a resident scene-painter at the Theatre Royal, Drury Lane, where he rose rapidly to fame through the huge quantity of spectacular scenery and (moving) dioramas which he produced for that house until 1834.

Stanfield abandoned scenery painting after Christmas 1834, though he made exceptions for two personal friends: he designed scenery for the stage productions of William Charles Macready, and for the amateur theatricals of Charles Dickens.

=== Spectacles ===
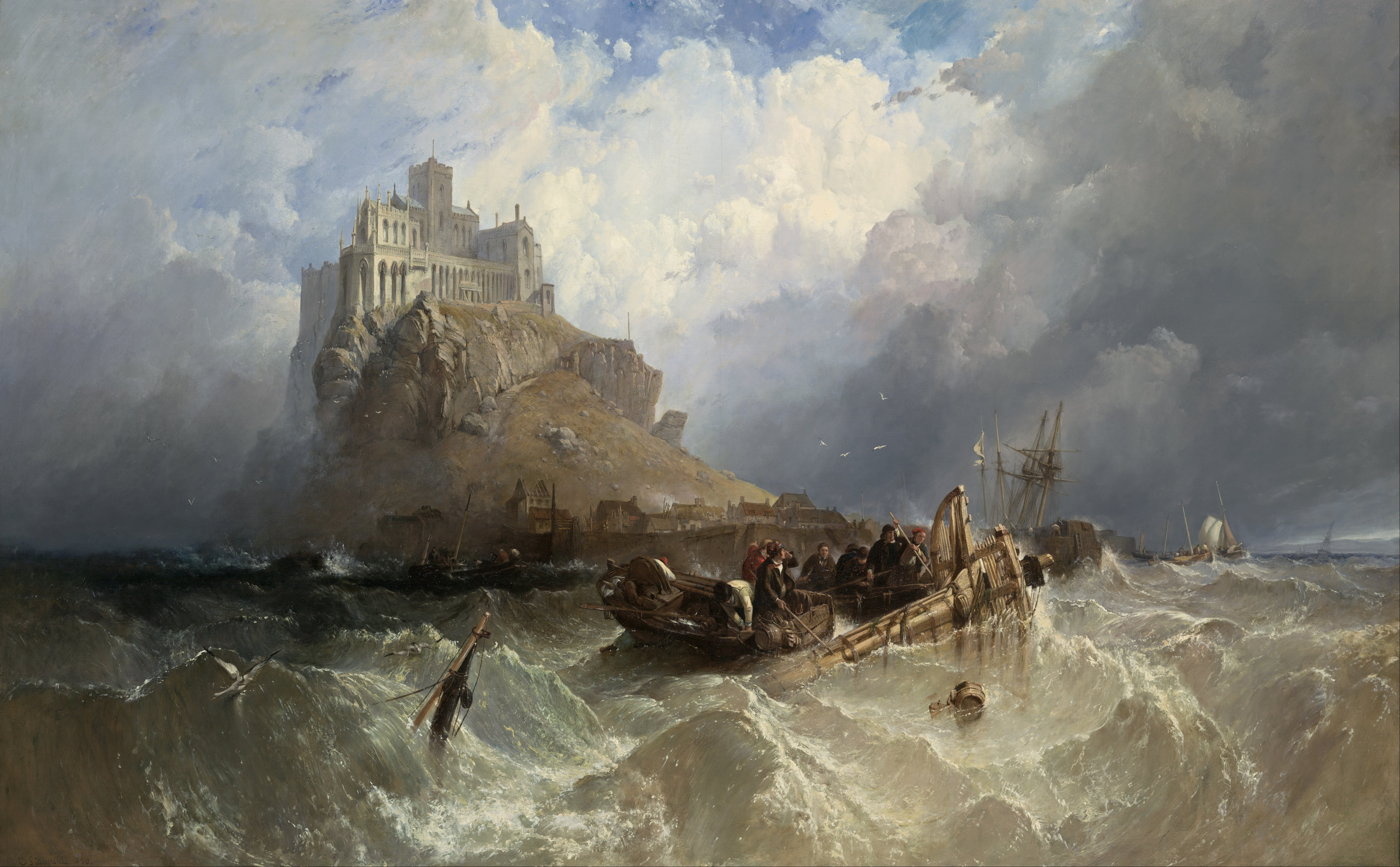
Mount St Michael, Cornwall, 1830

Stanfield partnered with David Roberts in several large-scale diorama and panorama projects in the 1820s and 1830s. The newest development in these popular entertainments was the "moving diorama" or "moving panorama." These consisted of huge paintings that unfolded upon rollers like giant scrolls; they were supplemented with sound and lighting effects to create a nineteenth-century anticipation of cinema. Stanfield and Roberts produced eight of these entertainments; in light of their later accomplishments as marine painters, their panoramas of two important naval engagements, the Bombardment of Algiers and The Battle of Navarino, are worth noting.

An 1830 tour through Germany and Italy furnished Stanfield with material for two more moving panoramas, The Military Pass of the Simplon (1830) and Venice and Its Adjacent Islands (1831). Stanfield executed the first in only eleven days; it earned him a fee of £300. The Venetian panorama of the next year was 300 feet long and 20 high; gas lit, it unrolled through 15 or 20 minutes. The show included stage props and even singing gondoliers. After the show closed, portions of the work were re-used in productions of Shakespeare's The Merchant of Venice and Otway's Venice Preserved.

The moving panoramas of Stanfield and other artists became highlights of the traditional Christmas pantomimes.

== Royal Academy ==
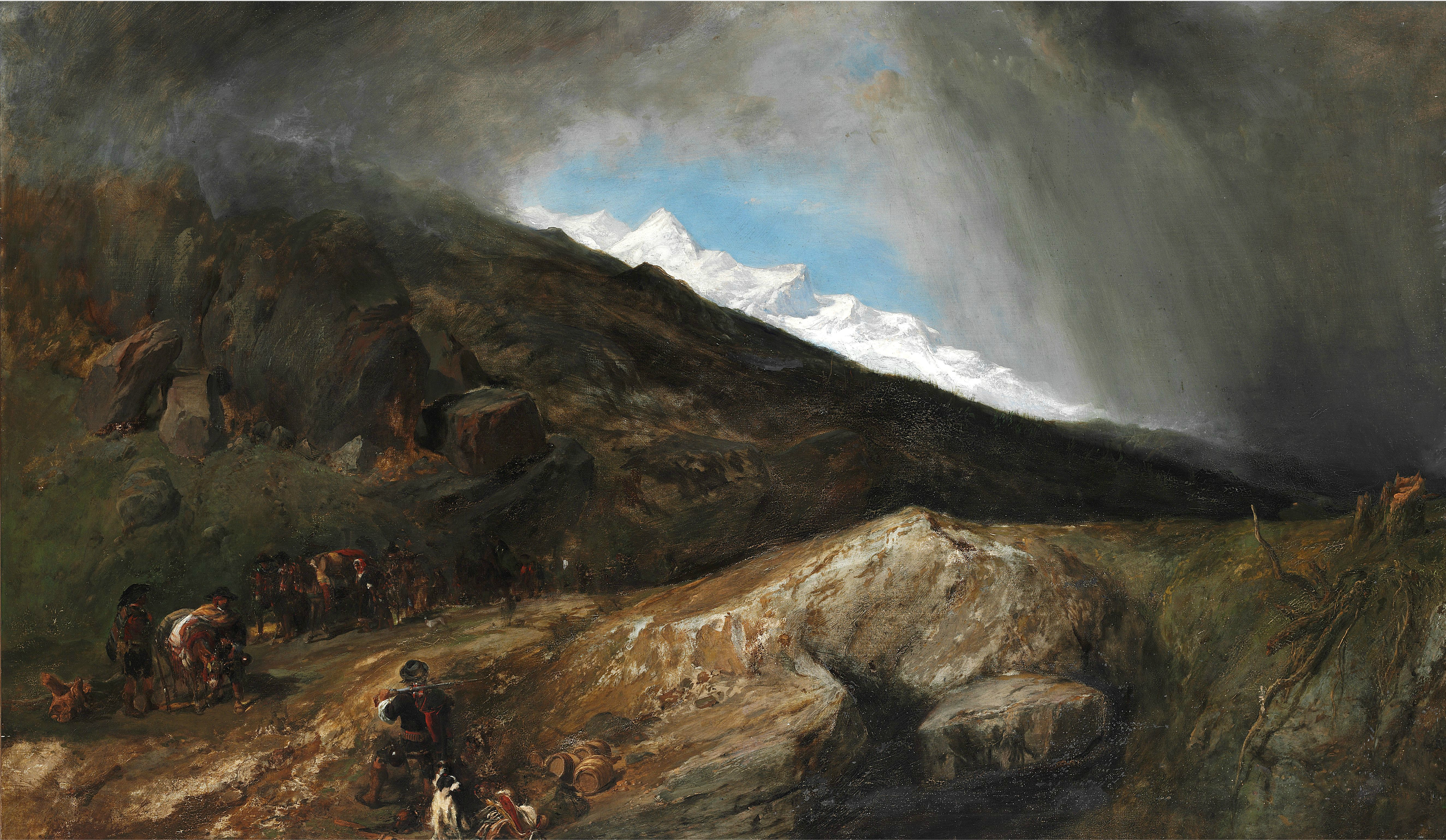
Mountainous landscape with a hunter and travellers

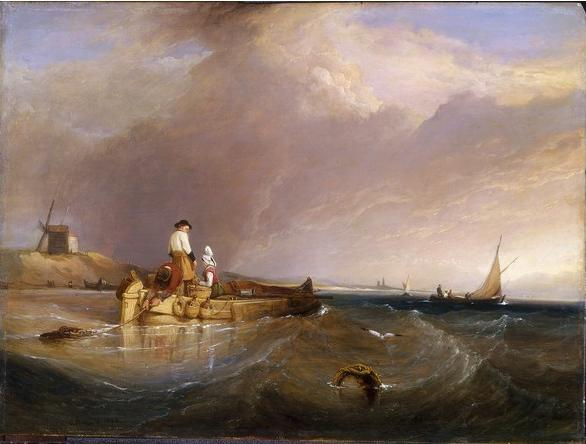
View on the Scheldt (1826)

Meanwhile, Stanfield developed his skills as an easel painter, especially of marine subjects; he first exhibited at the Royal Academy at the 1820 Exhibition and continued, with only a few early interruptions, to his death. He was also a founder member of the Society of British Artists (from 1824) and its president for 1829, and exhibited there and at the British Institution, where in 1828 his picture Wreckers off Fort Rouge gained a premium of 50 guineas. In 1829 he exhibited A View near Devizes at the Society of British Artists, a notable commission from the Wiltshire landowner George Watson Taylor. To reflect his growing reputation, he sat for the Portrait of Clarkson Stanfield by John Simpson, a former pupil of Thomas Lawrence

He was elected Associate Member of the Royal Academy in 1832, and became a full Academician in February 1835. His elevation was in part a result of the interest of William IV who, having admired his St. Michael's Mount at the Royal Academy Exhibition of 1830 (now in the National Gallery of Victoria, Australia), commissioned two works from him of The Opening of New London Bridge (1832) and Portsmouth Harbour. Both were displayed at the 1832 Academy Exhibition and remain in the Royal Collection.

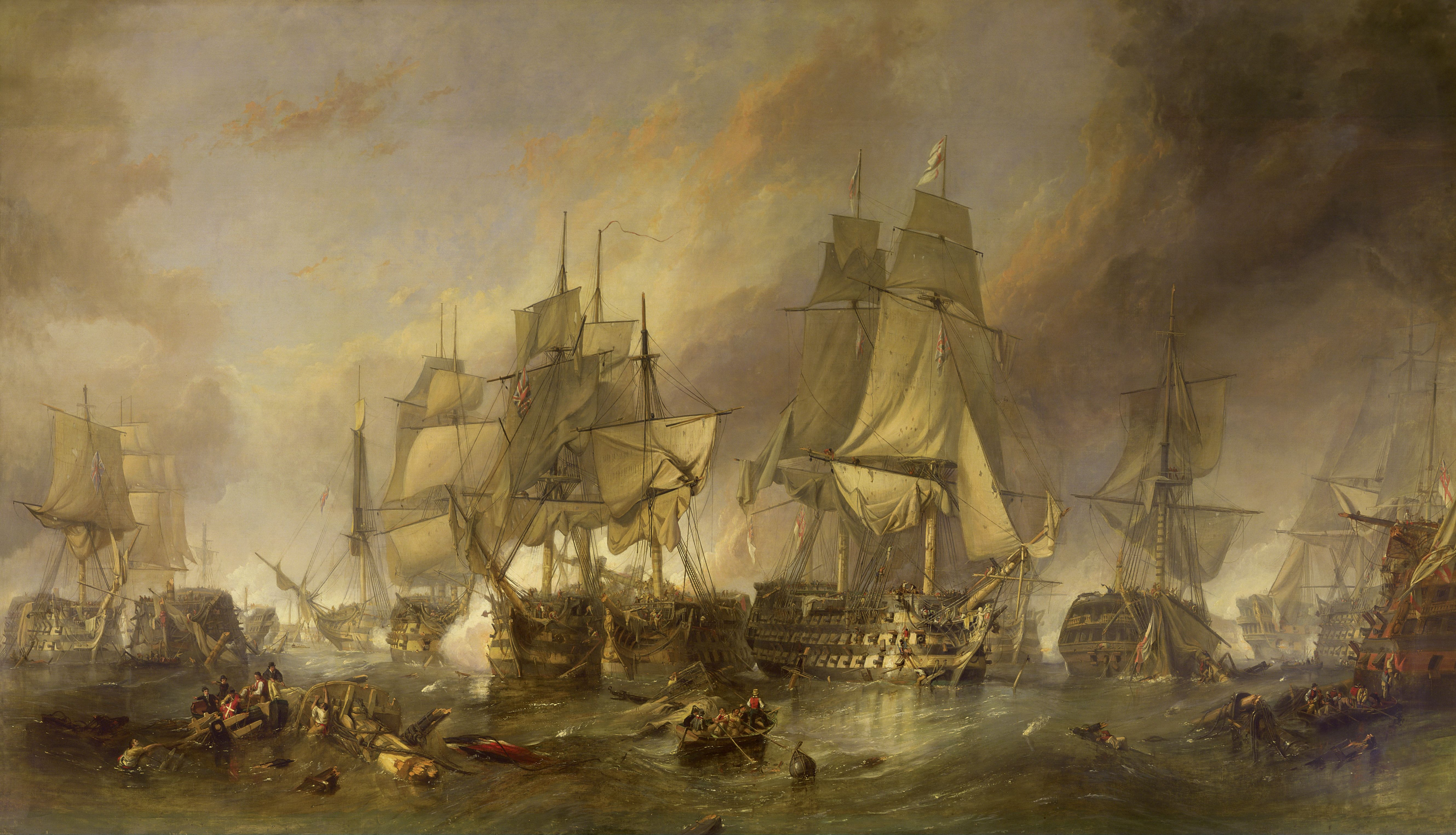
The Battle of Trafalgar, 1836

Until his death he contributed a long series of powerful and highly popular works to the Academy, both of marine subjects and landscapes from his travels at home and in France, the Netherlands, Germany, Italy, Spain, and Ireland. Notable works include:

- The Battle of Trafalgar (1836), executed for the United Service Club
- the Castle of Ischia (1841), now in Sunderland Museum and Art Gallery
- Isola Bella (1841), among the results of a visit to Italy in 1839
- French troops Fording the Magra (1847)
- HMS The Victory Bearing the Body of Nelson Towed into Gibraltar after the Battle of Trafalgar (1853), painted for Sir Samuel Morton Peto at Somerleyton Hall, Suffolk (which is today open to the public)
- The Abandoned (1856; untraced since 1930)

He also executed two notable series of Venetian subjects, one for the former dining room at Bowood House, Wiltshire, for the 3rd Marquess of Lansdowne, the other for the Duchess of Sutherland at Trentham Park, Staffordshire. Neither house survives but some of Stanfield's work for Bowood can still be seen there (the present Bowood House, open to the public, is a conversion of the old stable block).

He illustrated Heath's Picturesque Annuals for the years 1832–1834, and in 1838 published a collection of lithographic views on the Rhine, Moselle and Meuse; forty subjects from both sides of the English Channel were also steel-engraved under the title of Stanfield's Coast Scenery (1836). Among literary works for which he provided illustrations were Frederick Marryat's The Pirate and the Three Cutters (1836), Poor Jack (1840) and the lives and works of Lord Byron, George Crabbe, and Samuel Johnson, mainly in editions by John Murray.

From 1847 to 1865 he lived at Stanfield House in Hampstead.

== Assessment ==
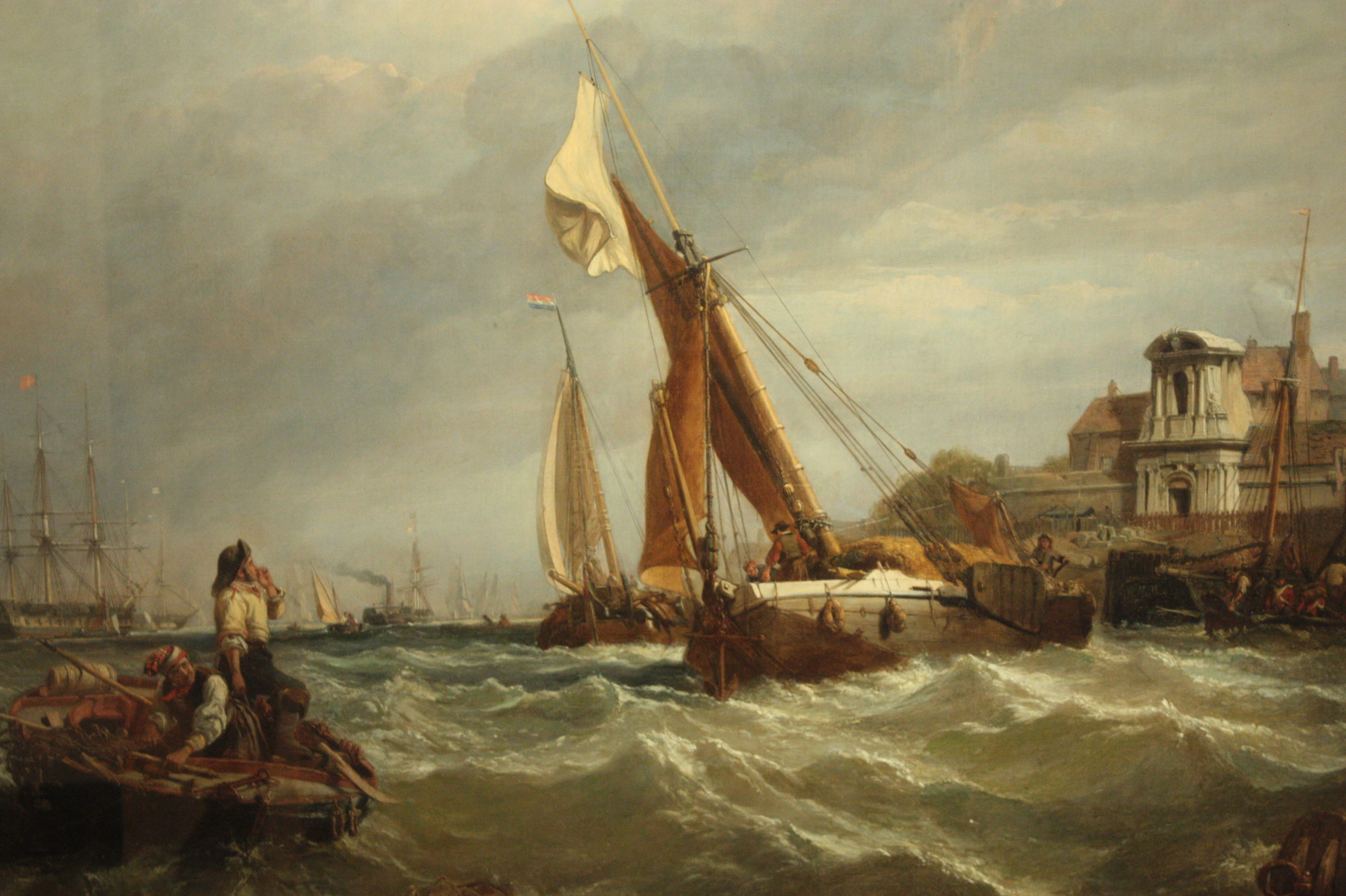
Tilbury Fort - Wind Against Tide by Clarkson Stansfield, 1849

Stansfield's art was significantly influenced by his early practice as a scene-painter. But, though there are always aspects of the scenic in his works, and though their color is rather dry and hard, they are large and effective in handling, powerful in their treatment of broad atmospheric effects and telling in composition, and they evince the knowledge of the artistic materials with which their painter deals.

The art critic John Ruskin considered his treatment of the sea and clouds of a very high order and called him the "leader of our English Realists." Wishing him to be sometimes "less wonderful and more terrible," Ruskin also pointed out the superior merits of his sketched work, especially in watercolour, to the often contrived picturesque qualities of many of his exhibited oils and the watercolours on which published engravings were based.

== Death and legacy ==
In his last 10 years, Stanfield's health deteriorated. He died in Hampstead, London, on 18 May 1867; there was an unfinished painting on his easel and a previous work, A Skirmish off Heligoland, hanging in a Royal Academy exhibition. He was buried in Kensal Green Catholic Cemetery.

Lifelong friend of Stanfield, the writer Charles Dickens, was one of the last visitors that Stanfield saw on the day he died. After Stanfield's death, Dickens wrote: "He was the soul of frankness, generosity and simplicity. The most genial, the most affectionate, the most loving and the most lovable of men. Success had never for an instant spoiled him . . . He had been a sailor once; and all the best characteristics that are popularly attributed to sailors, being his, and being in him refined by the influence of his Art, formed a whole not likely to be often seen."

In 1870, three years after his death, Stanfield was awarded a major retrospective of his work at the inaugural Royal Academy Winter Exhibition of 1870. In its appraisal of the show, The Times wrote: "There are no English painters whose works have won wider and warmer popularity outside the artistic pale. Stanfield's practiced command of the artist of composition, his unerring sense of the agreeable and picturesque in subject and effect, his pleasant and cheerful color and last, not least, the large use to which he turned his knowledge and love of the sea and shipping… (all) added to the widespread admiration he had won by his consummately skillful scene painting, (and) combined to make him one of the most popular, if not the most popular, of landscape painters."

== Personal life ==
Stanfield was admired not only for his art but his personal simplicity and a modesty. He was born a Catholic and became increasingly devout in middle life, after the loss in 1838 of his eldest son by his second marriage (to Rebecca Adcock) and then, in the 1850s, both the children of his first marriage (to Mary Hutchinson, who had died in childbirth).

His eldest surviving son, George Clarkson Stanfield (1828–1878) was also a painter of similar subjects, largely trained by his father. Another son, Francis Stanfield (1835–1914) was an English Catholic priest who is noted for having composed several notable hymns. His daughter Harriet married W. H. G. Bagshawe, son of Henry Bagshawe, and was mother of Joseph Ridgard Bagshawe, also a marine painter.

== Gallery ==
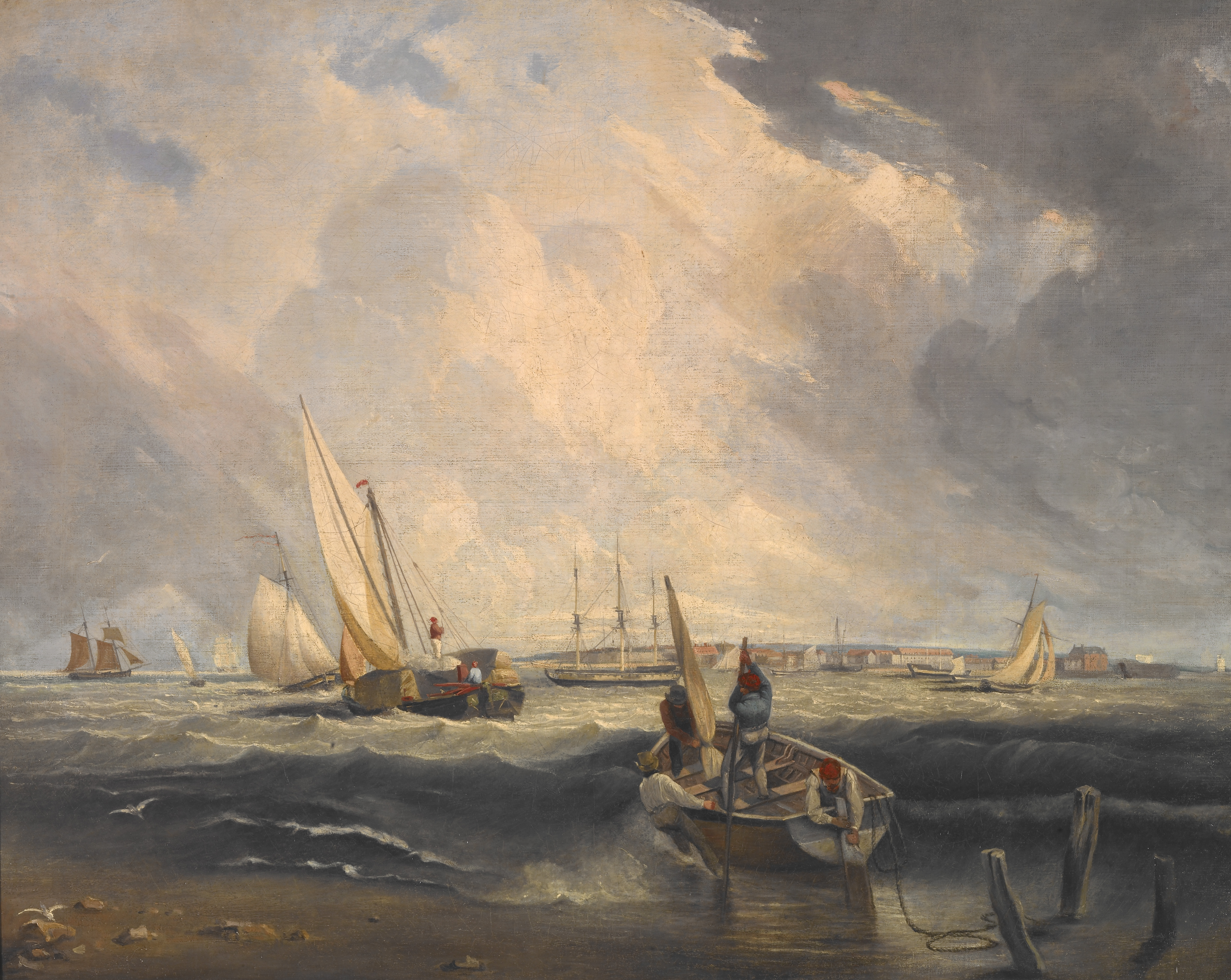
Bligh Sands, Sheerness, Indianapolis Museum of Art

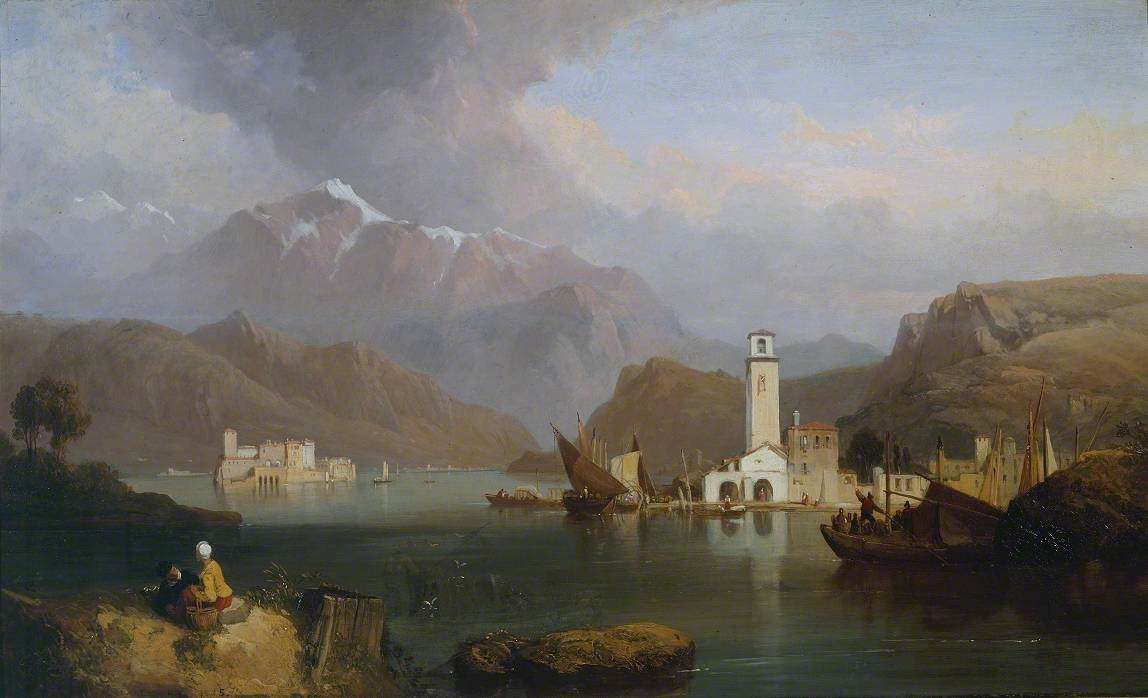
Lake Como (1825)

The Banks of the Rhine in Cologne (1826)

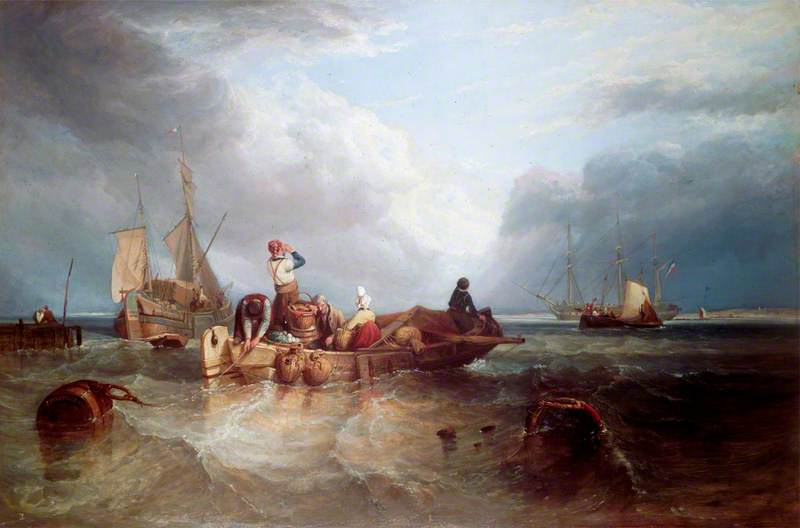
A Market Boat on the Scheldt (1826)

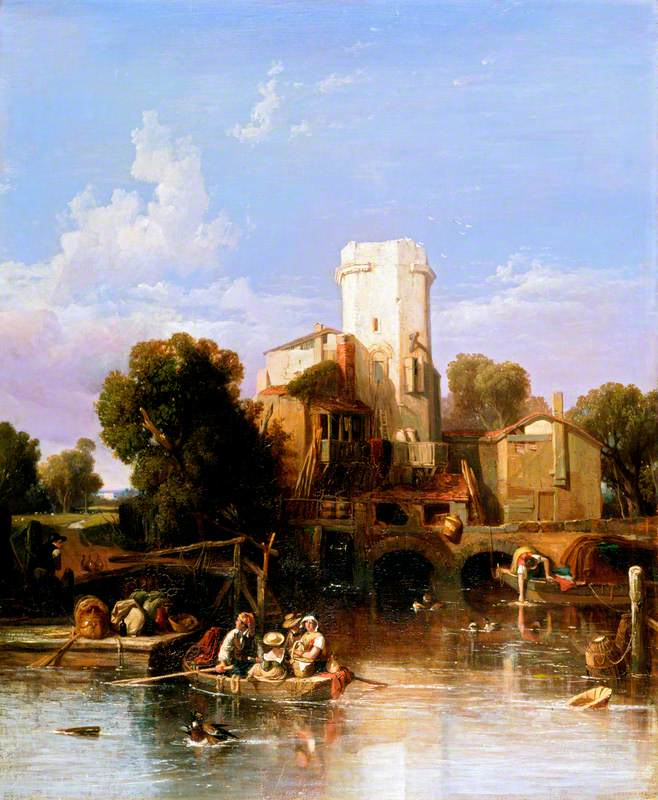
On the Rhine, near Cologne, 1829

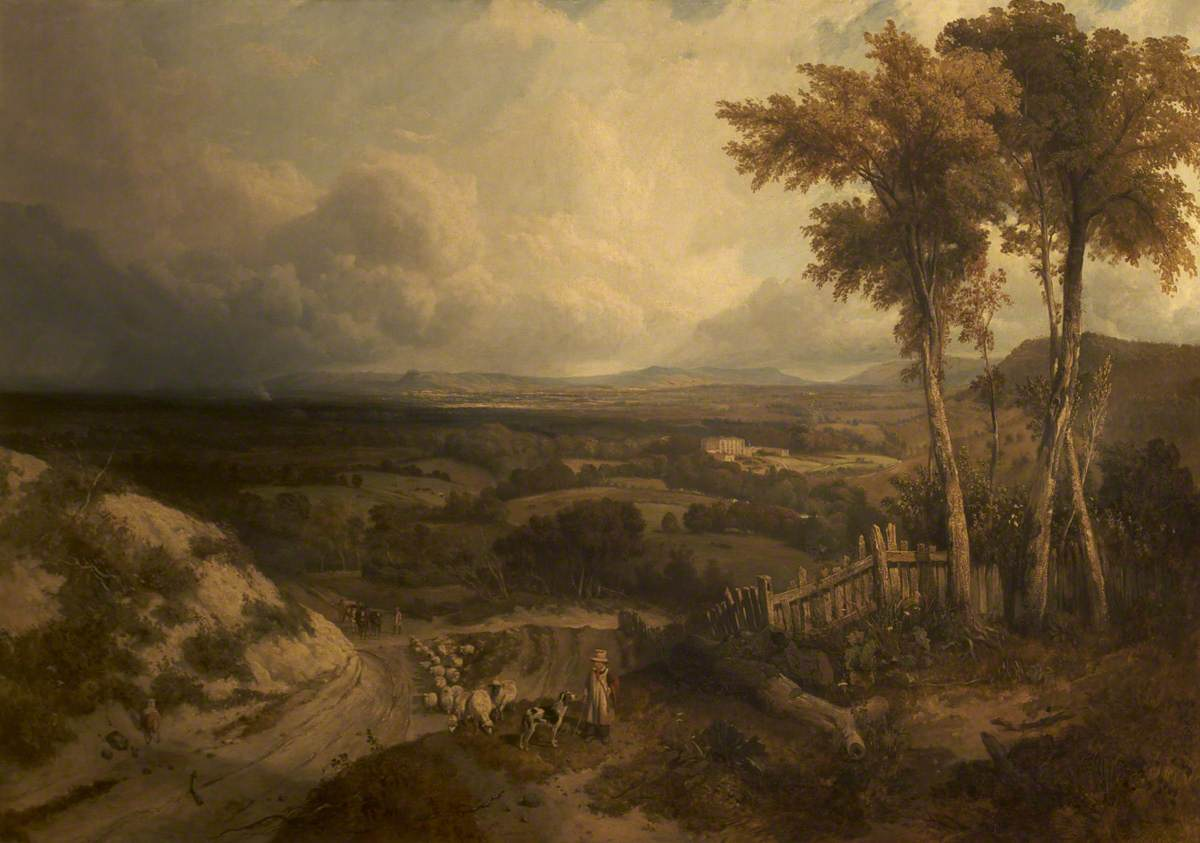
A View Near Devizes (1829)

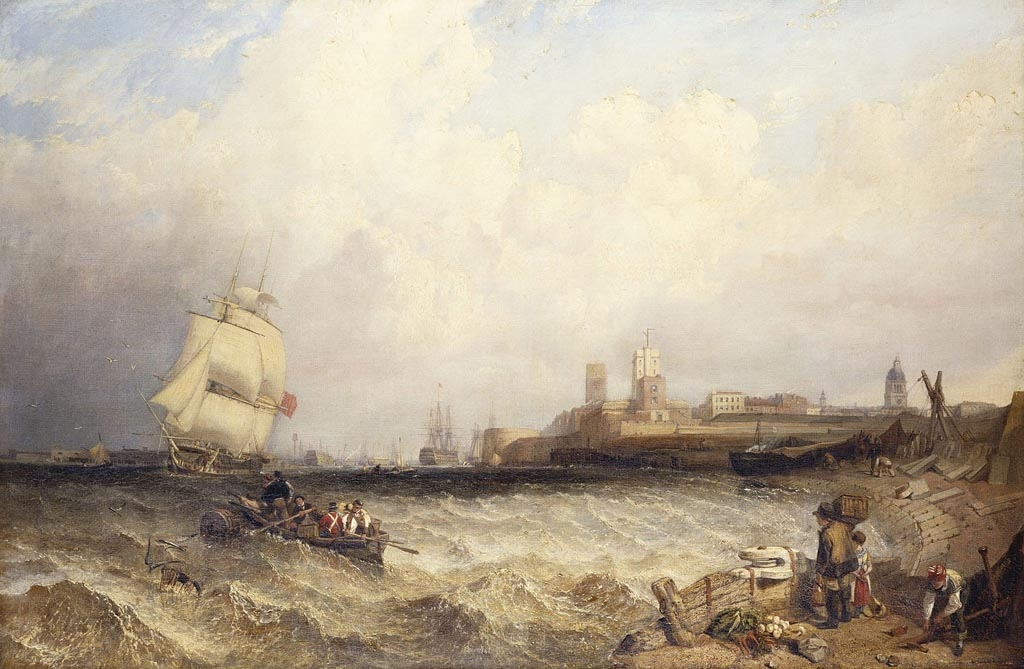
Portsmouth Harbour (1831), Royal Collection

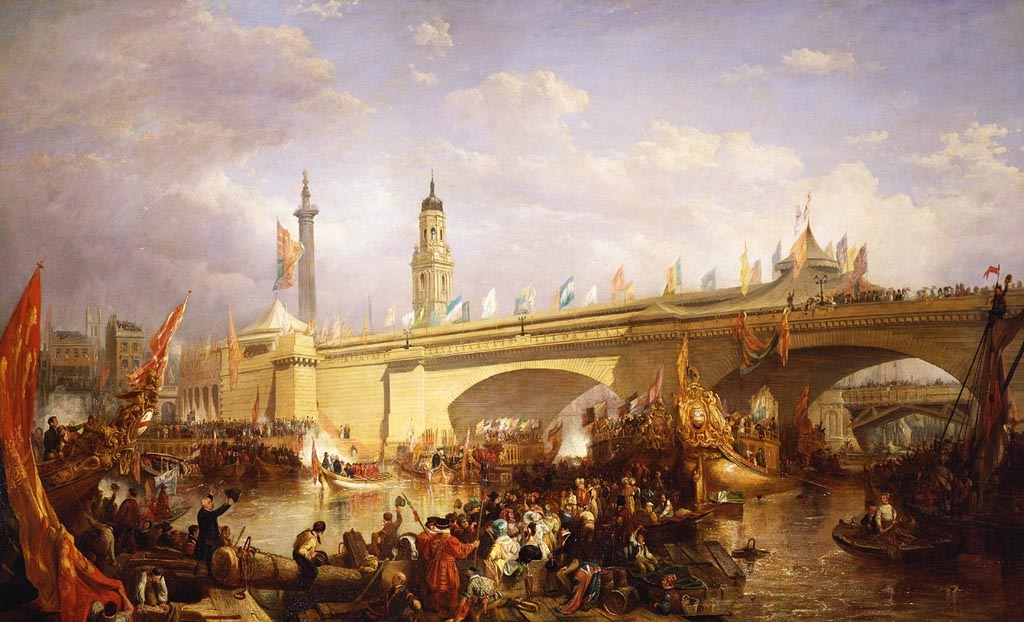
The Opening of New London Bridge (1832), Royal Collection

The Anchor Brewery, 1832

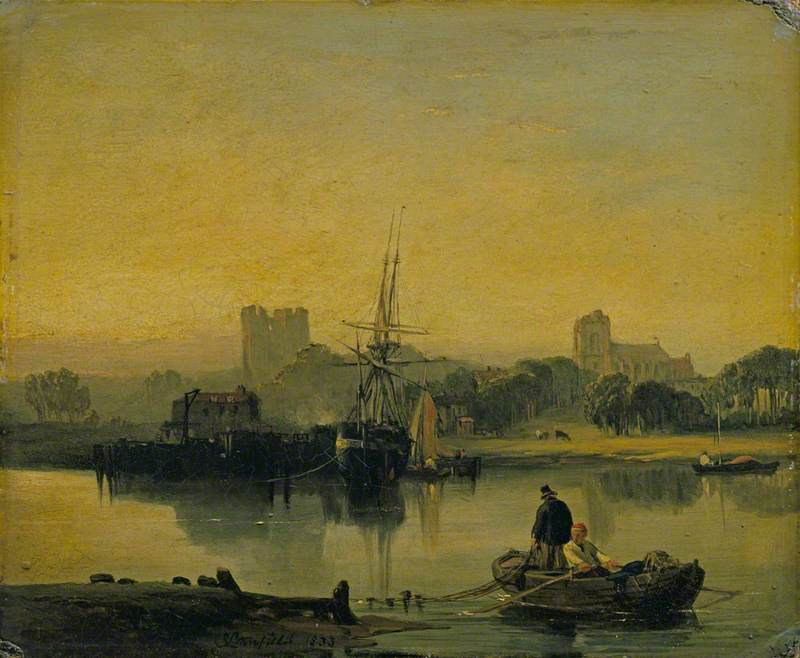
Orford (1833)

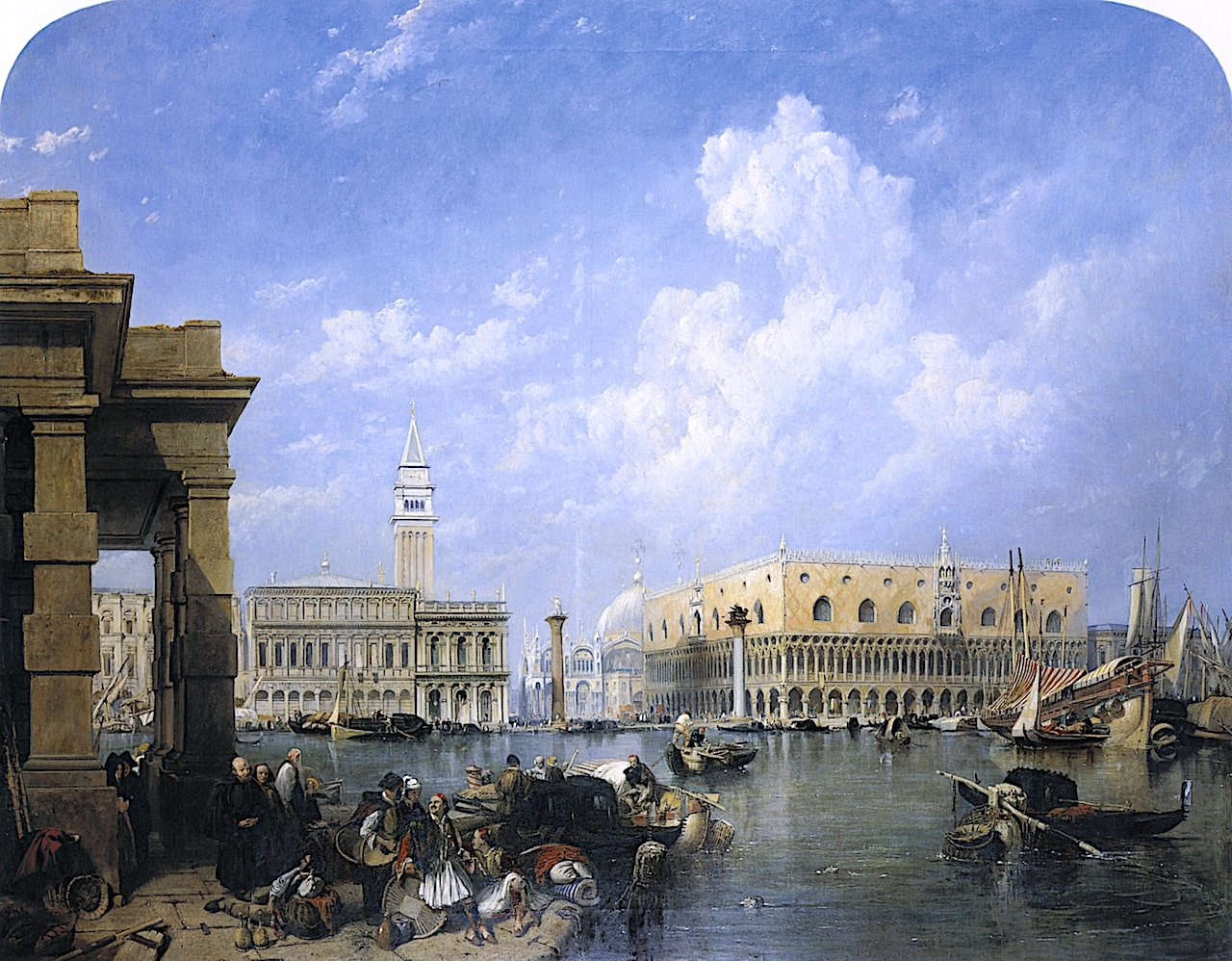
Venice from the Dogana (1833)

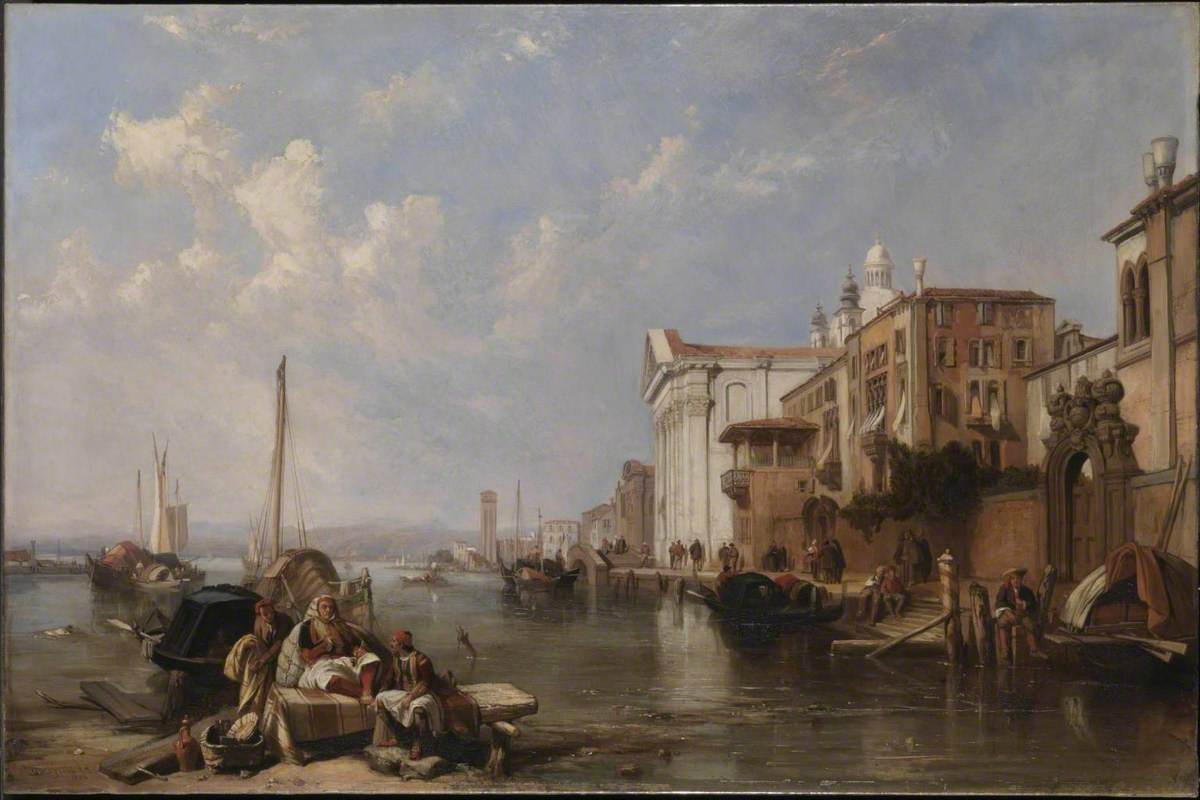
The Canal of the Guidecca, and the Church of the Gesuati, Venice (1836)

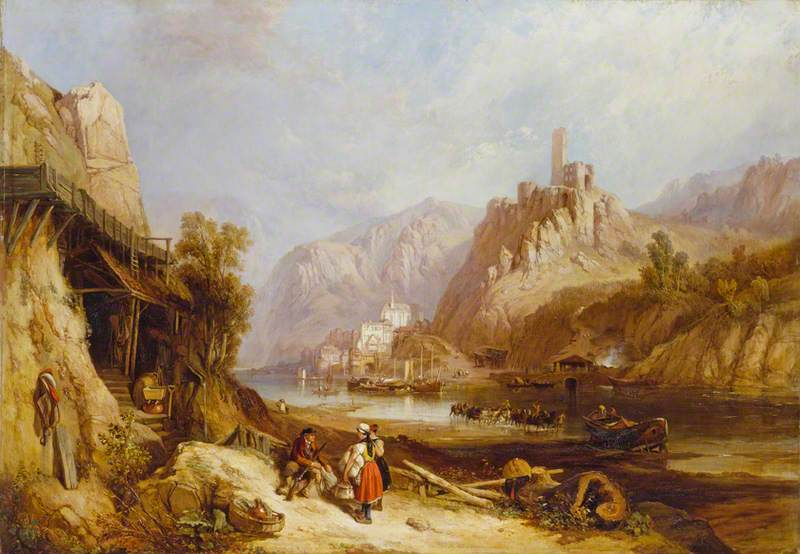
Beilstein on the Moselle (1837)

The Coast of Normandy near Gonville, France (1837)

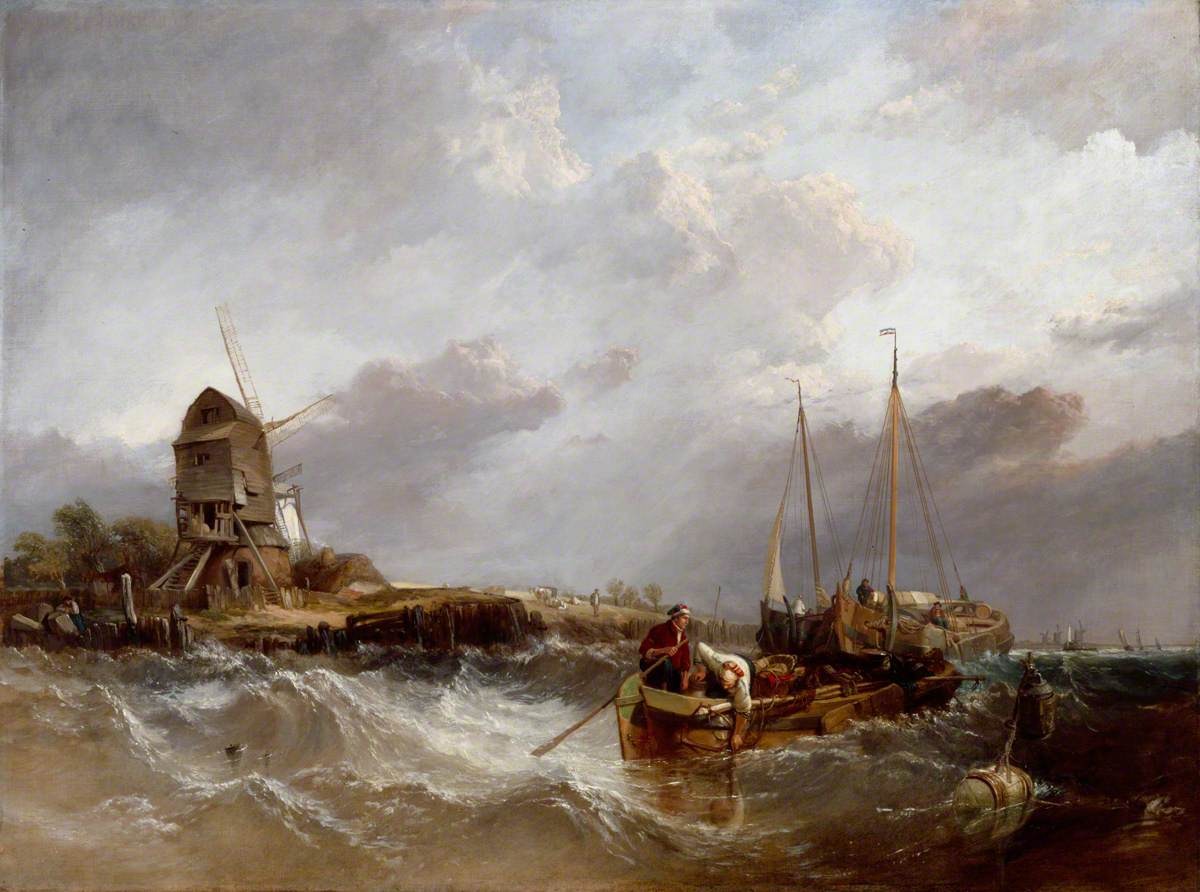
On the Scheldt near Leiskenshoeck (1837)

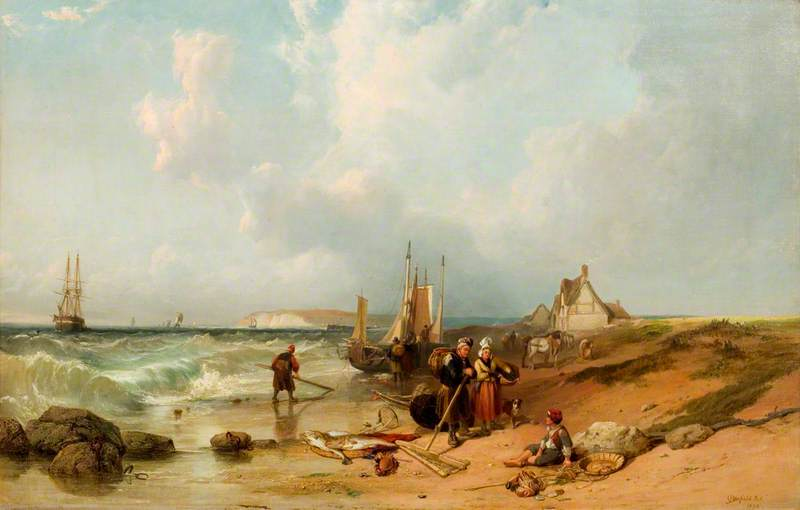
Sands near Boulogne (1838)

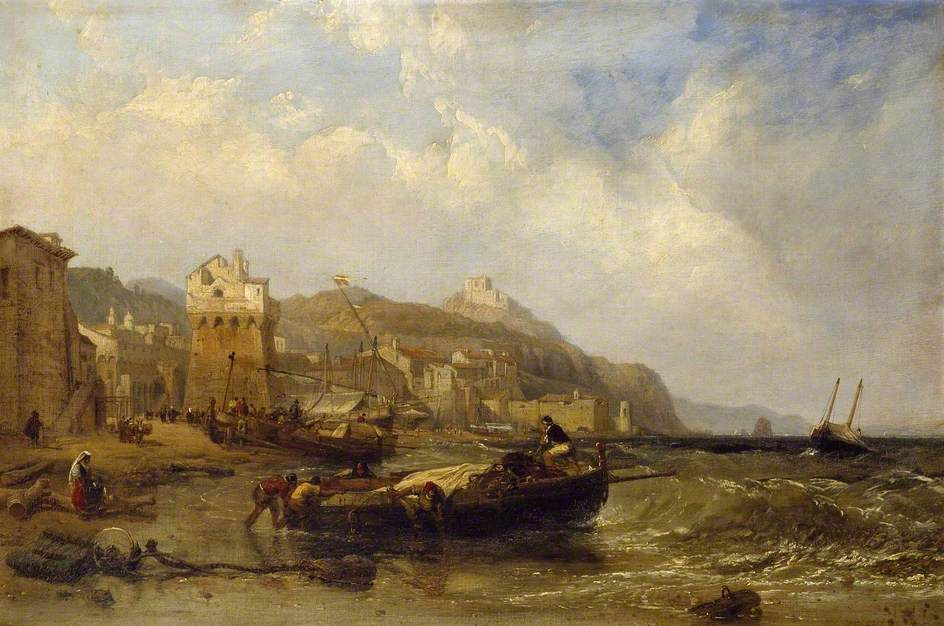
A View of Vietri in the Gulf of Salerno (1840)

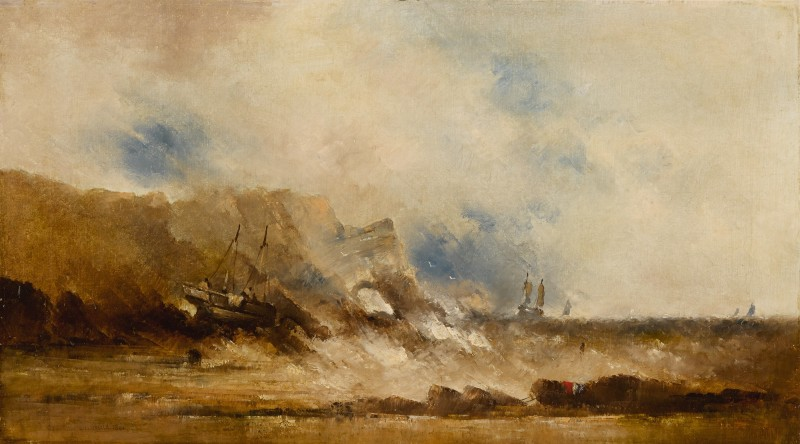
Ships at Sea (1841)

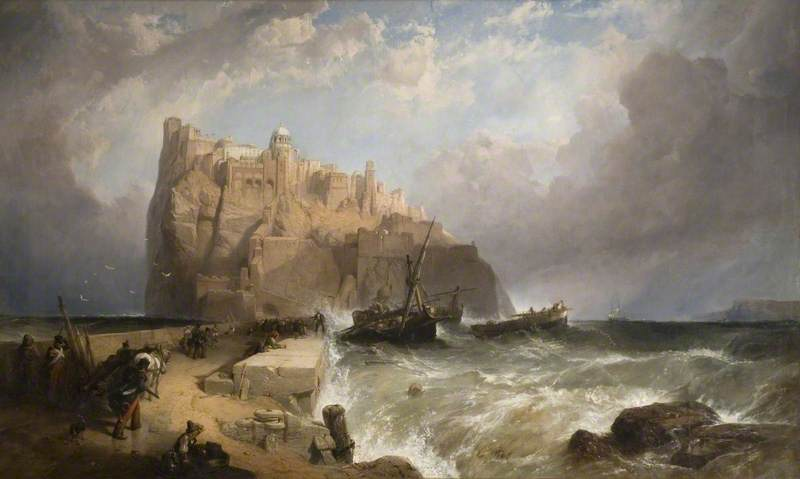
The Castle of Ischia from the Mole, Italy (1841)

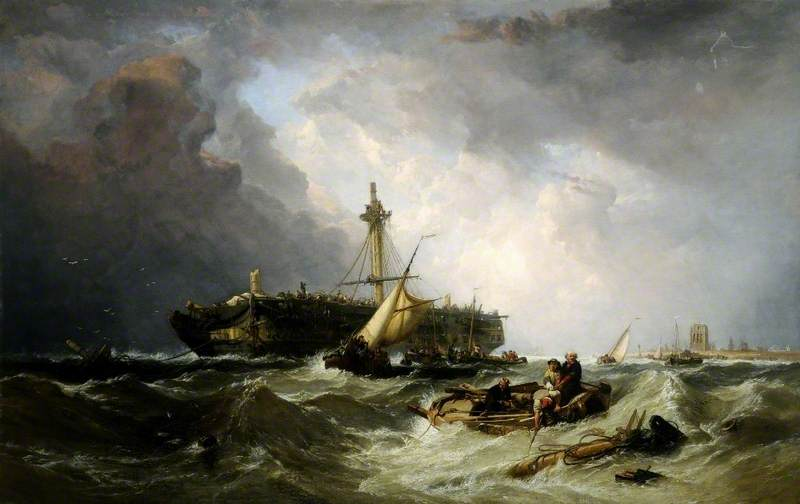
The Morning after the Wreck (1844)

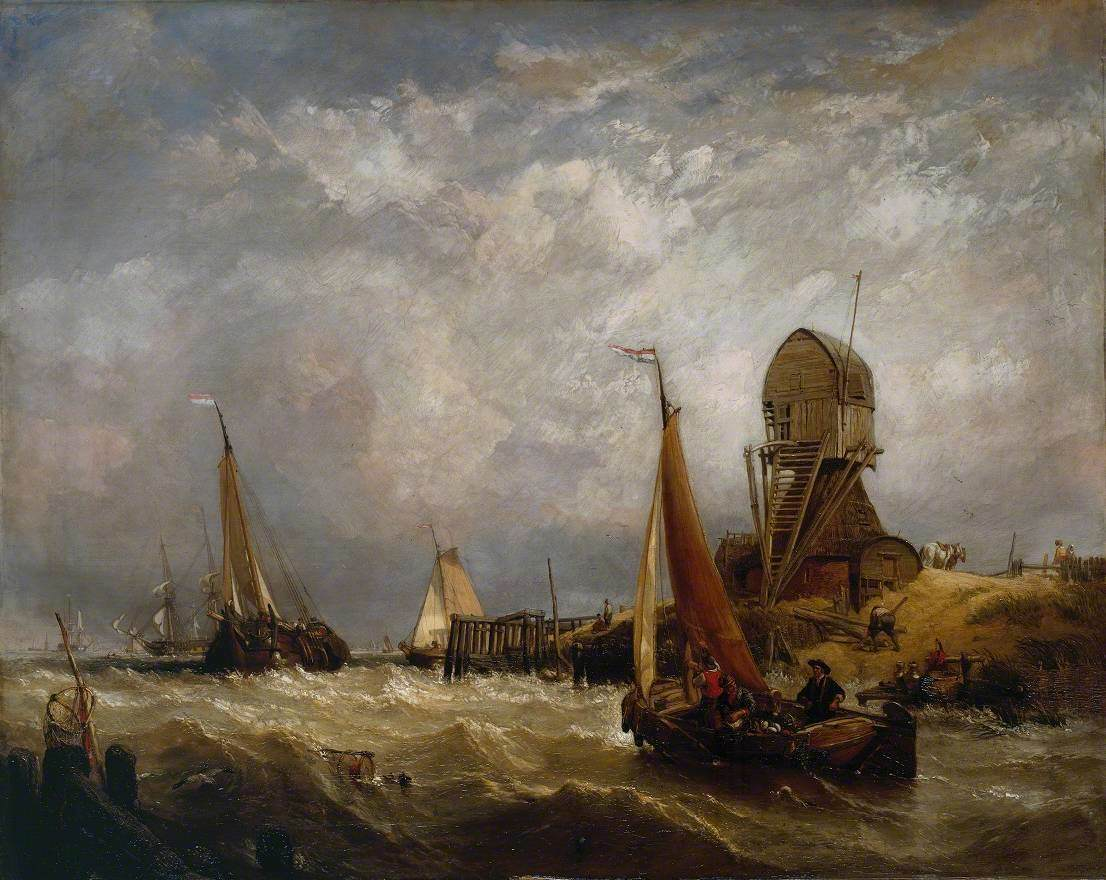
Oude Scheld – Texel Island (1844)

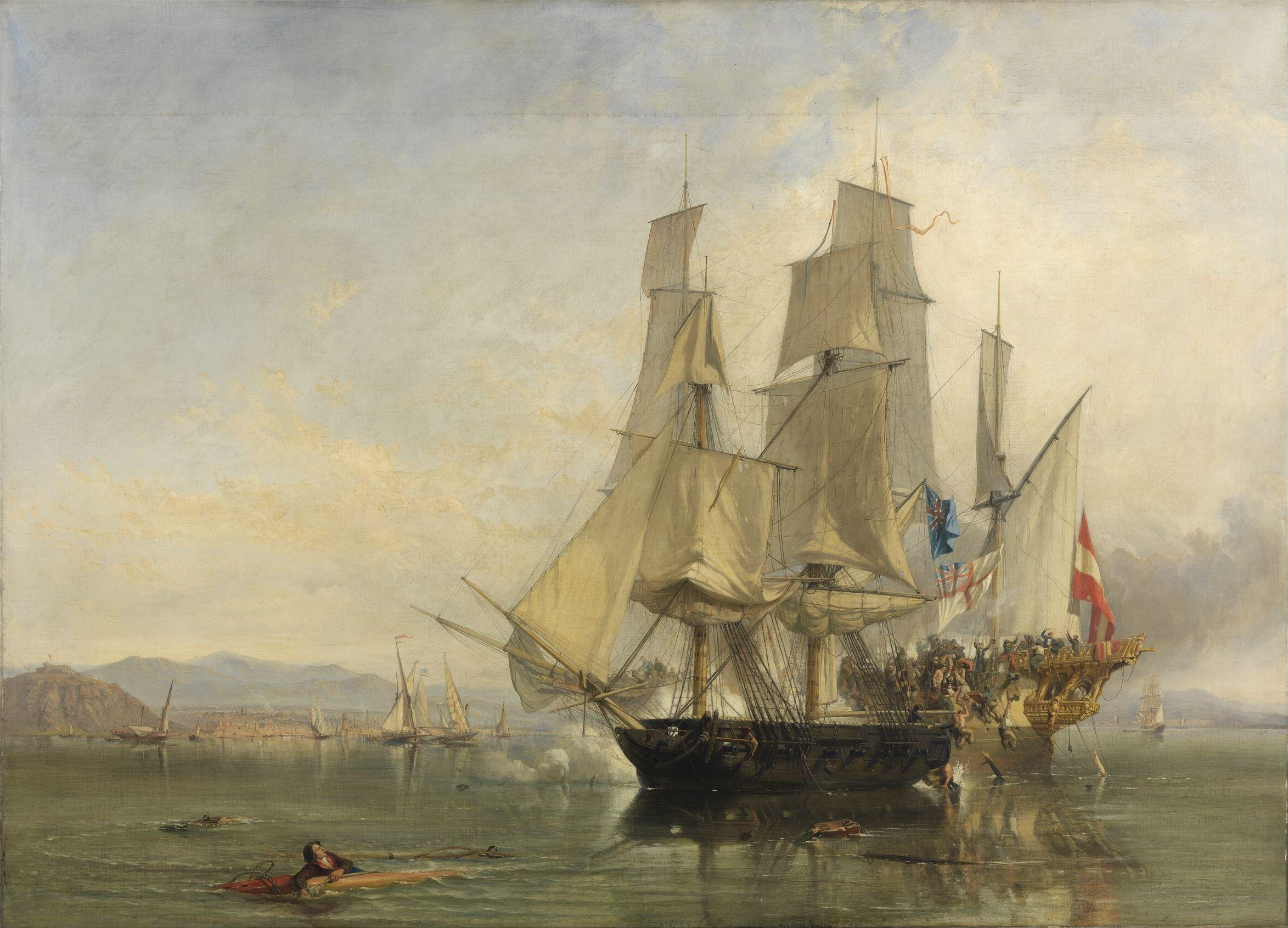
The Capture of the El Gamo (1845)

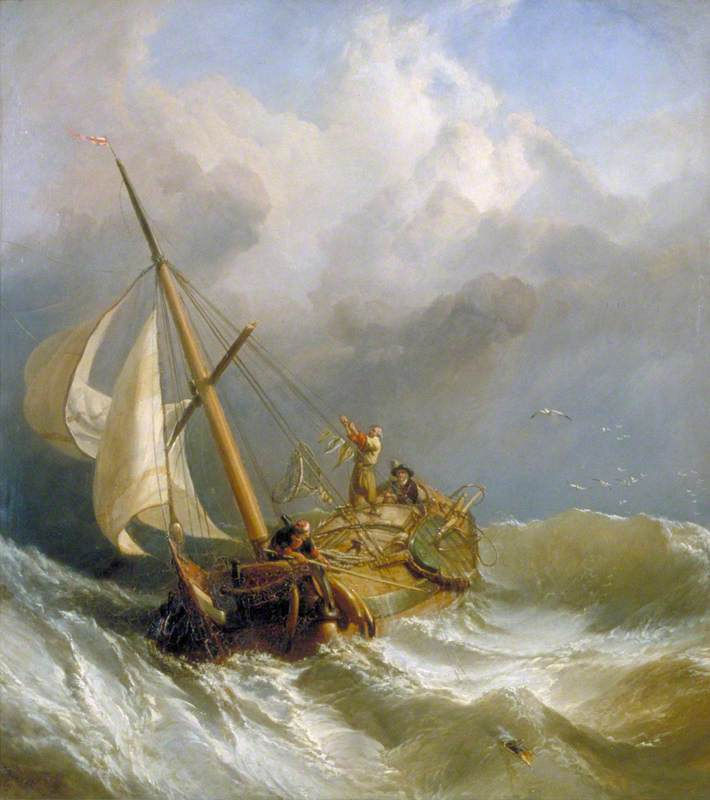
On the Dogger Bank (1846)

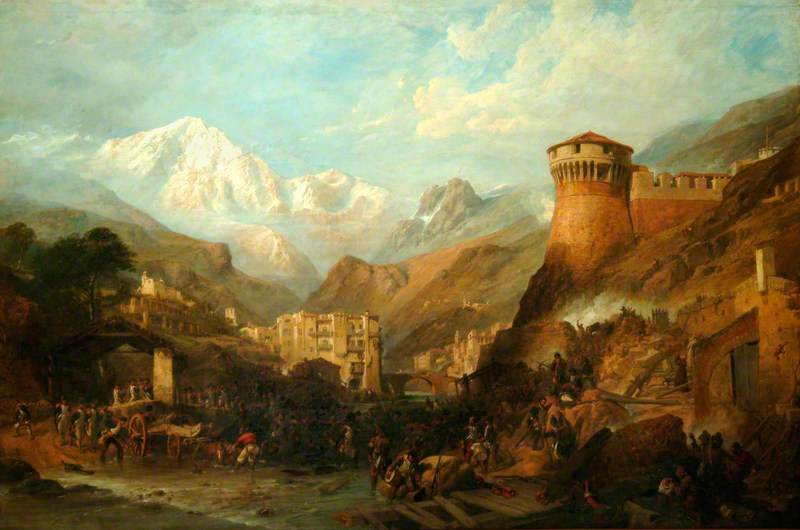
The Battle of Roveredo (1846)

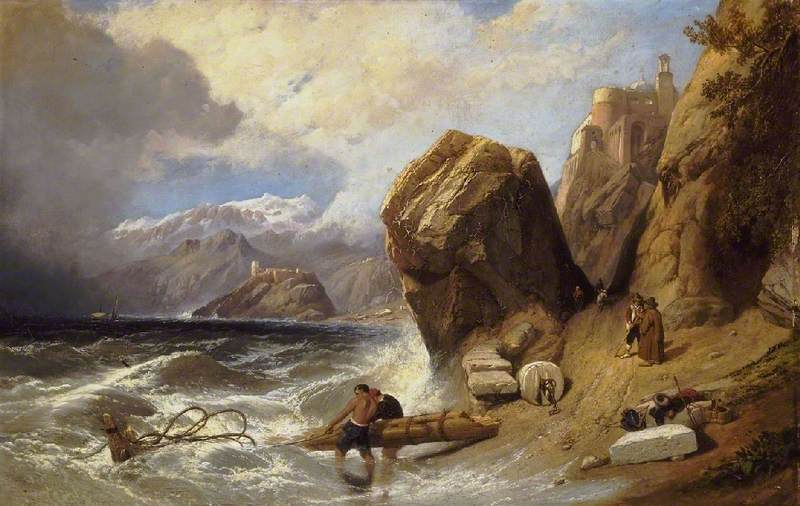
Coast Scene Near Genoa (1846)

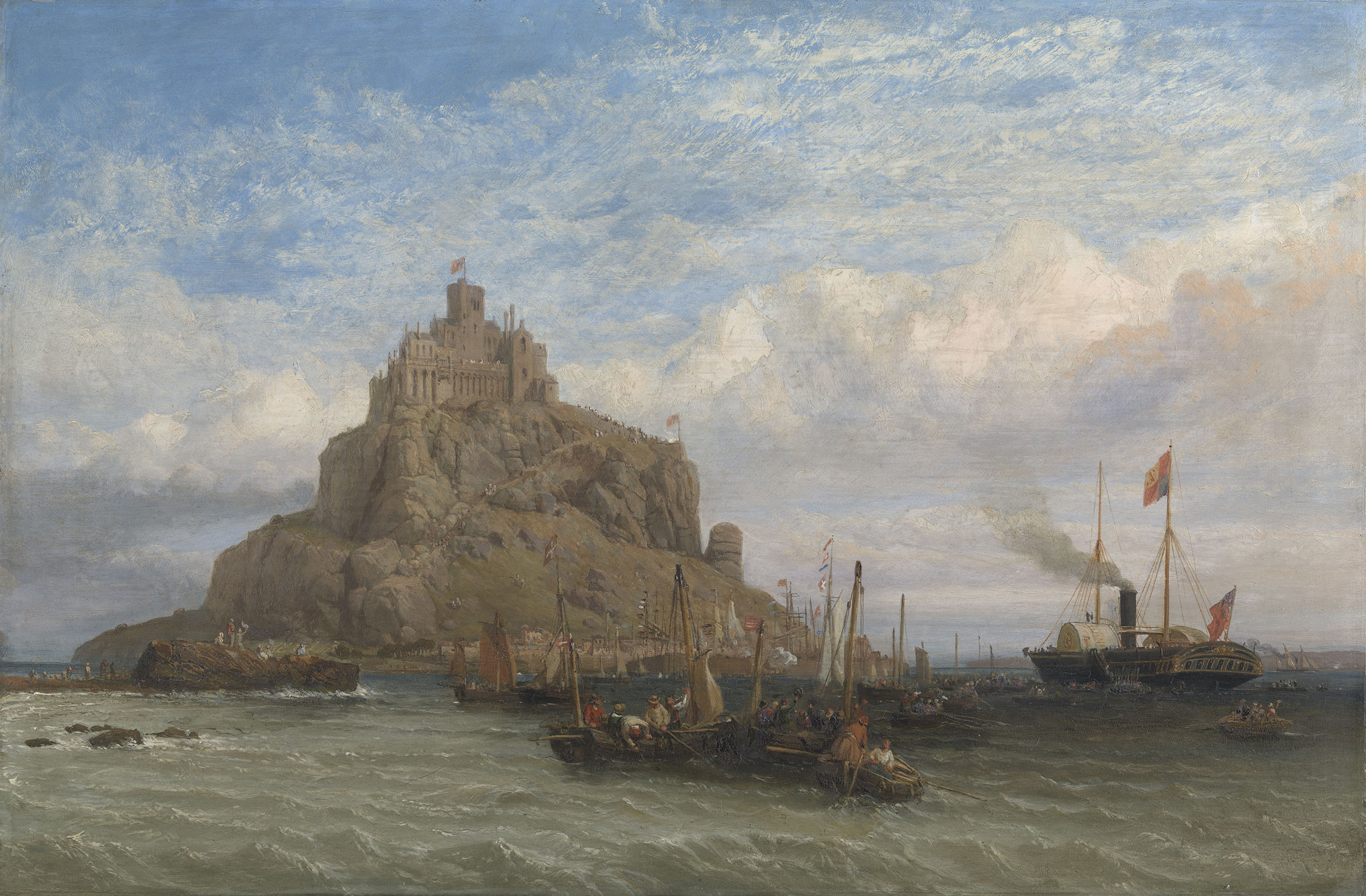
The Royal Yacht Passing St Michael's Mount (1846)

French Troops Fording the Margra (1847)

On the Zuyder Zee (1847)

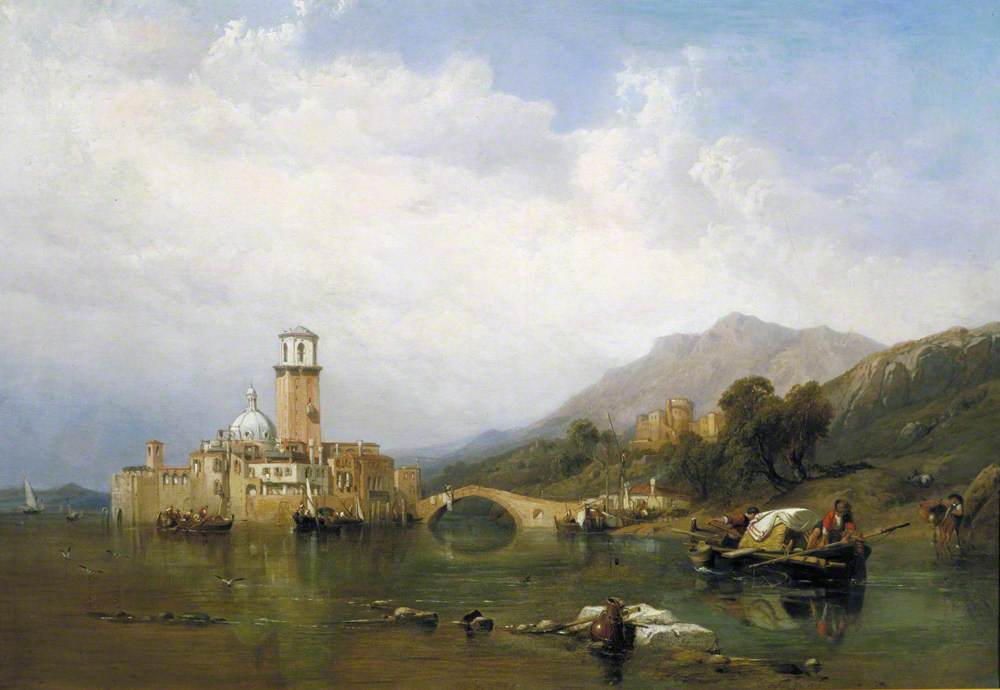
In the Gulf of Venice (1848)

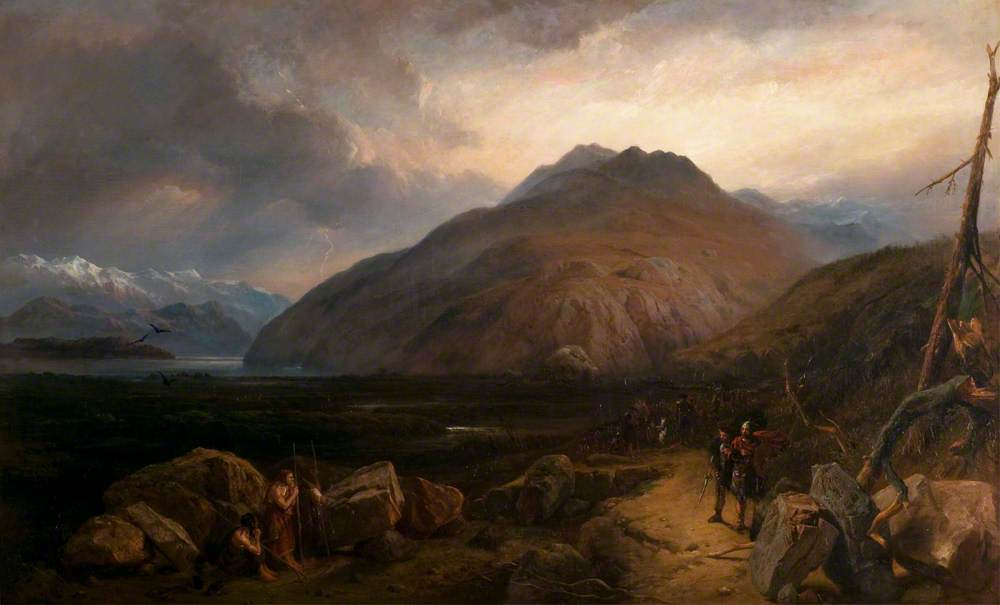
Macbeth and the Witches (1850)

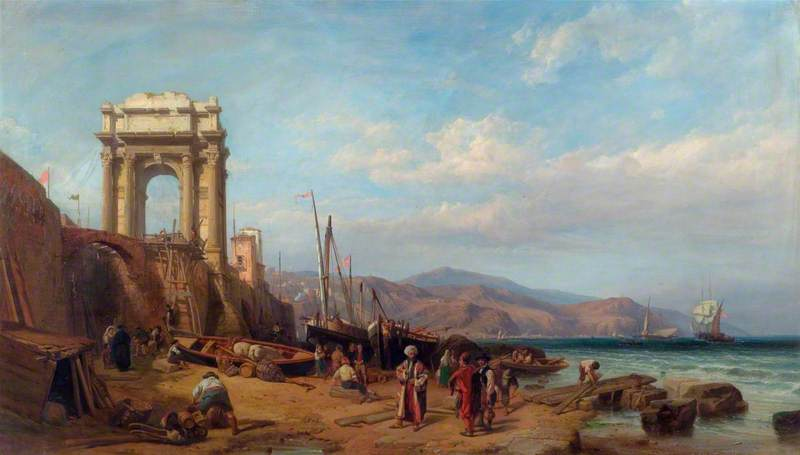
Trajan's Arch, Ancona (1851)

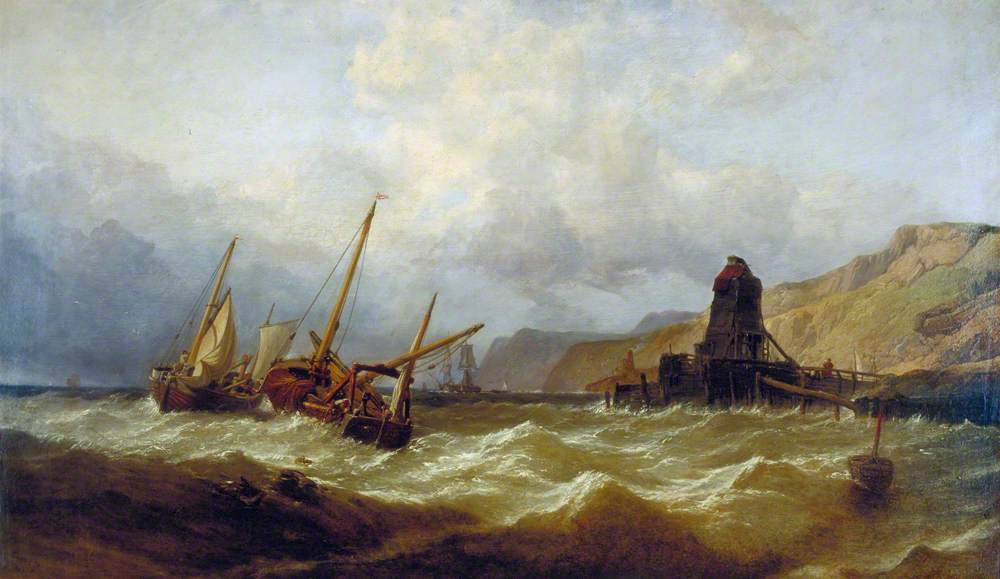
Oxwich Bay (1851)

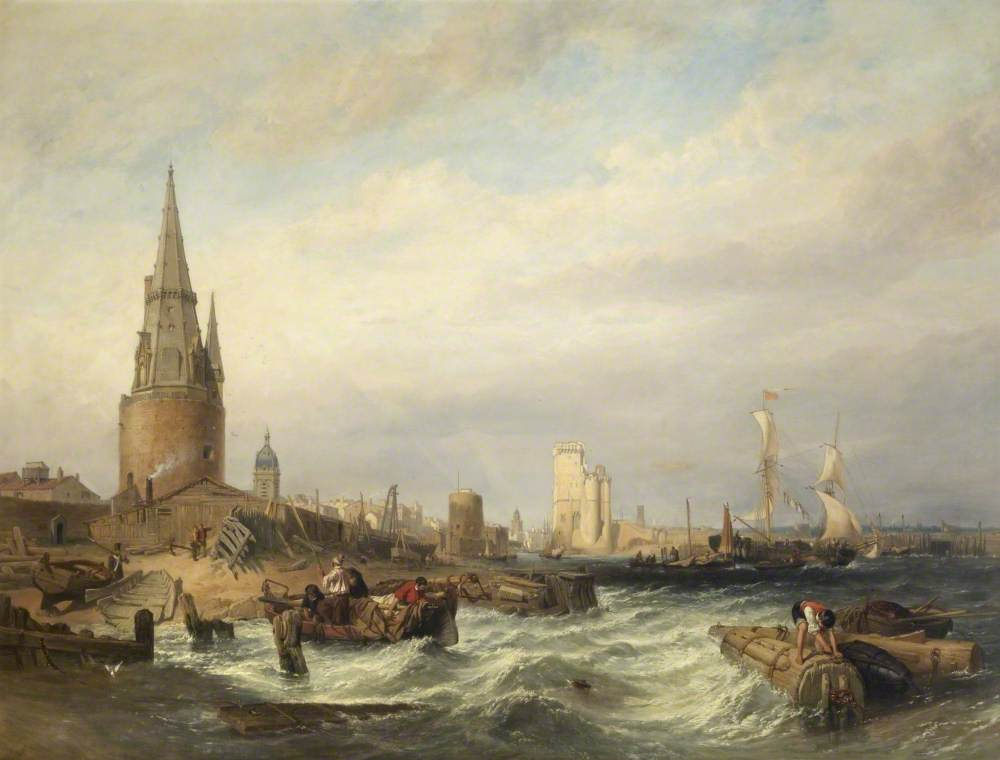
The Harbour of La Rochelle (1852)

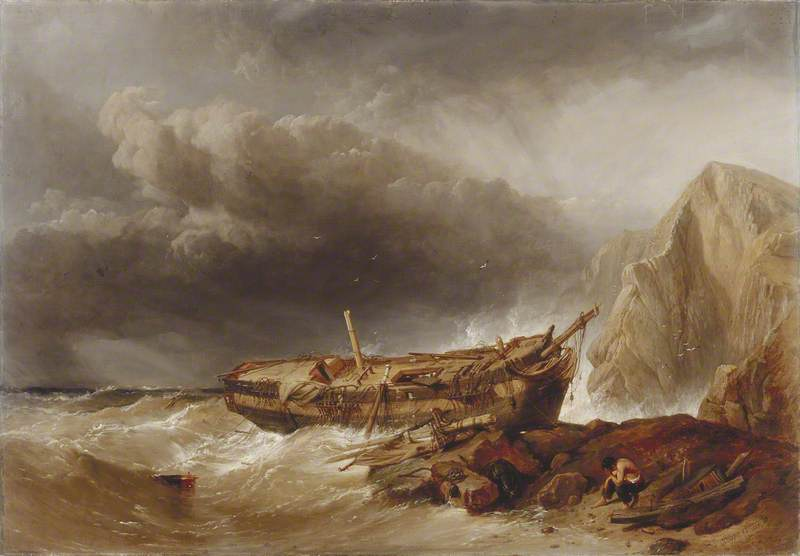
The Last of the Crew (1853)

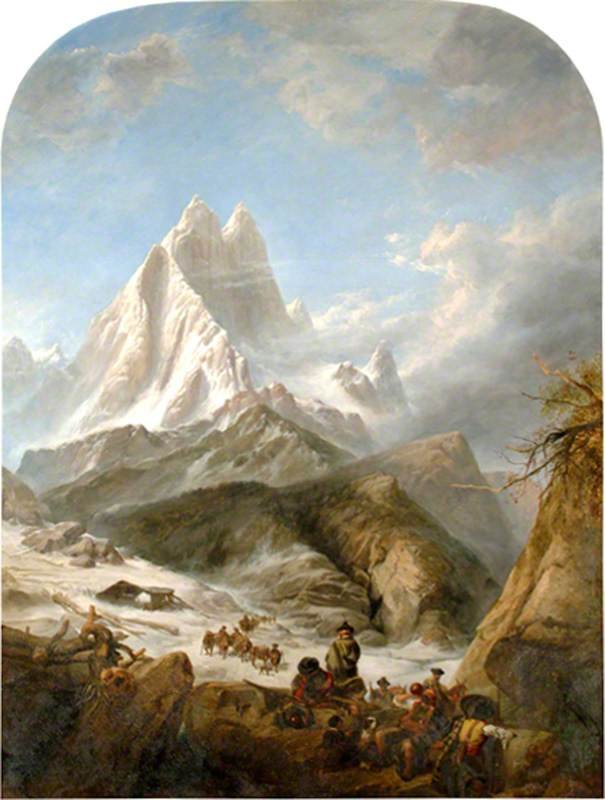
View of the Pic du Midi d'Ossau in the Pyrenees (1854)

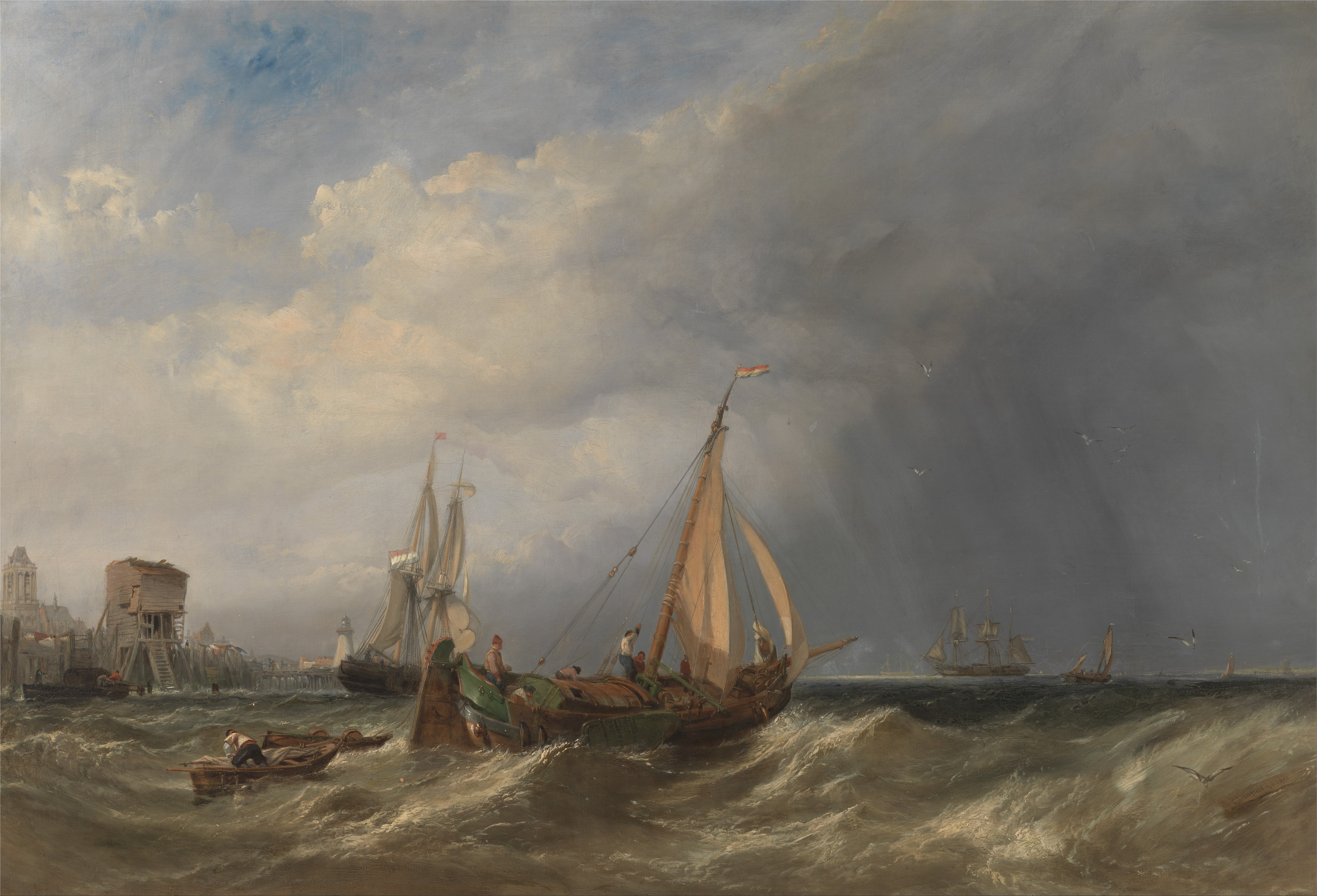
A Dutch Barge and Merchantmen Running out of Rotterdam (1856)

The Fortress of Savona (1858)

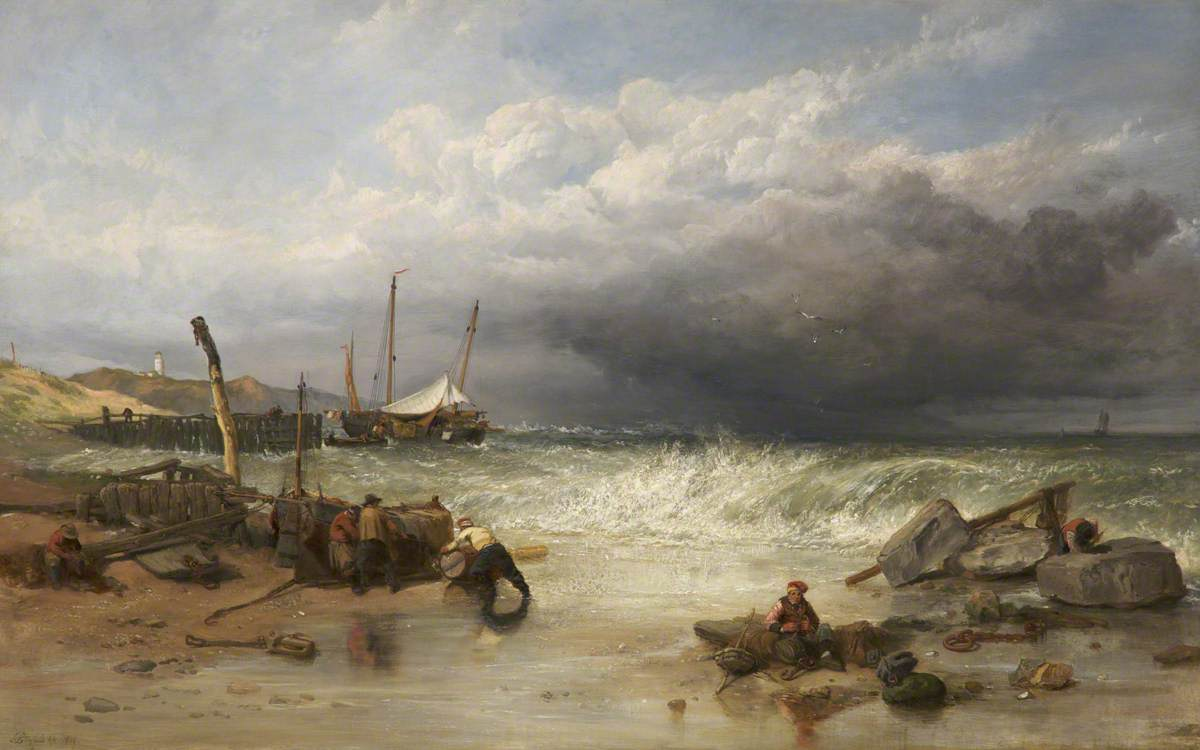
On the Coast of Brittany (1858)

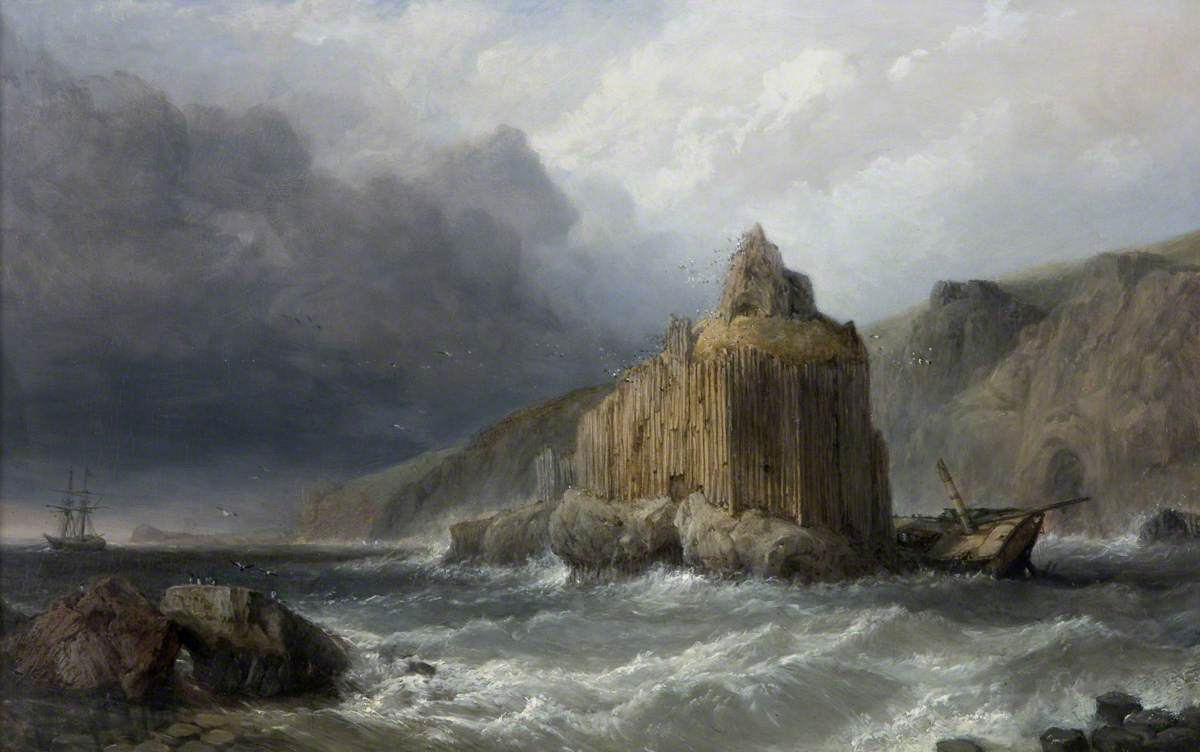
Stack Rock, County Antrim (1861)

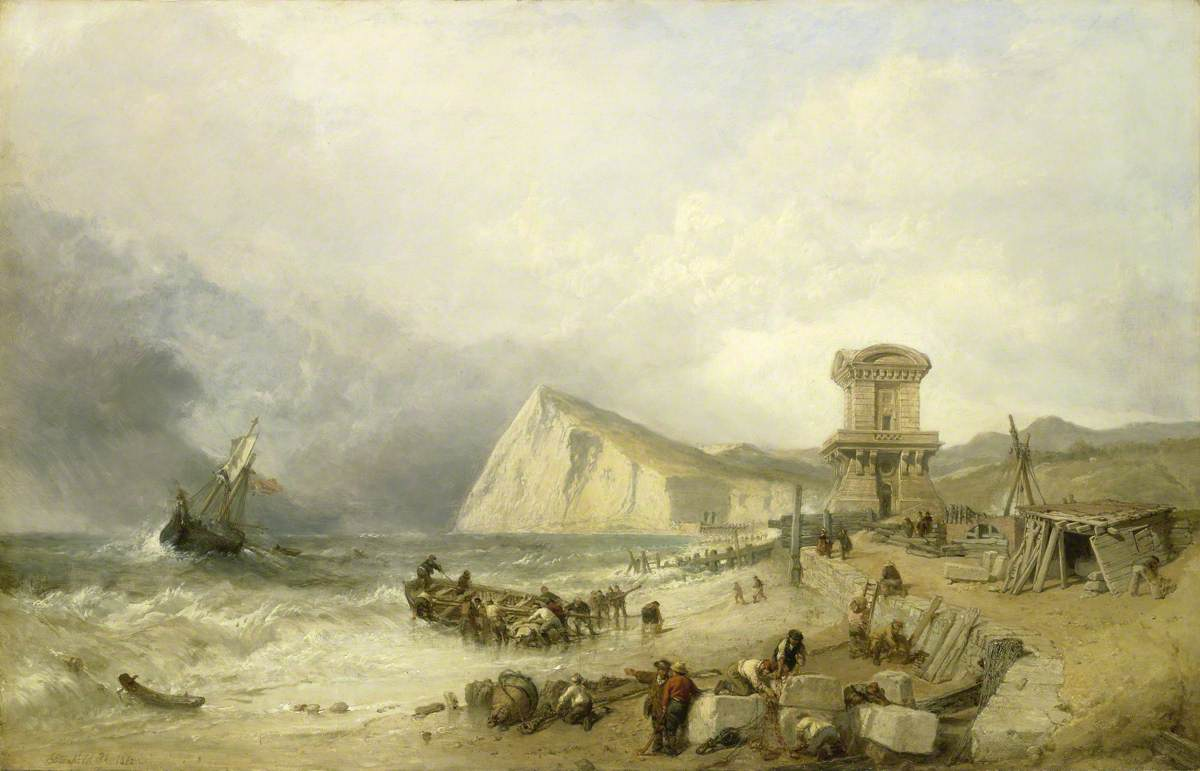
Shakespeare Cliff, Dover, 1849 (1862), Royal Museums Greenwich

The Morning after Trafalgar (1863)

Professional and academic associations
| Preceded by Henry Hoppner Meyer | President of the Royal Society of British Artists; 1829–30 | Succeeded by James Holmes |
