= Portsmouth Harbour (painting) =

Painting by Clarkson Stanfield

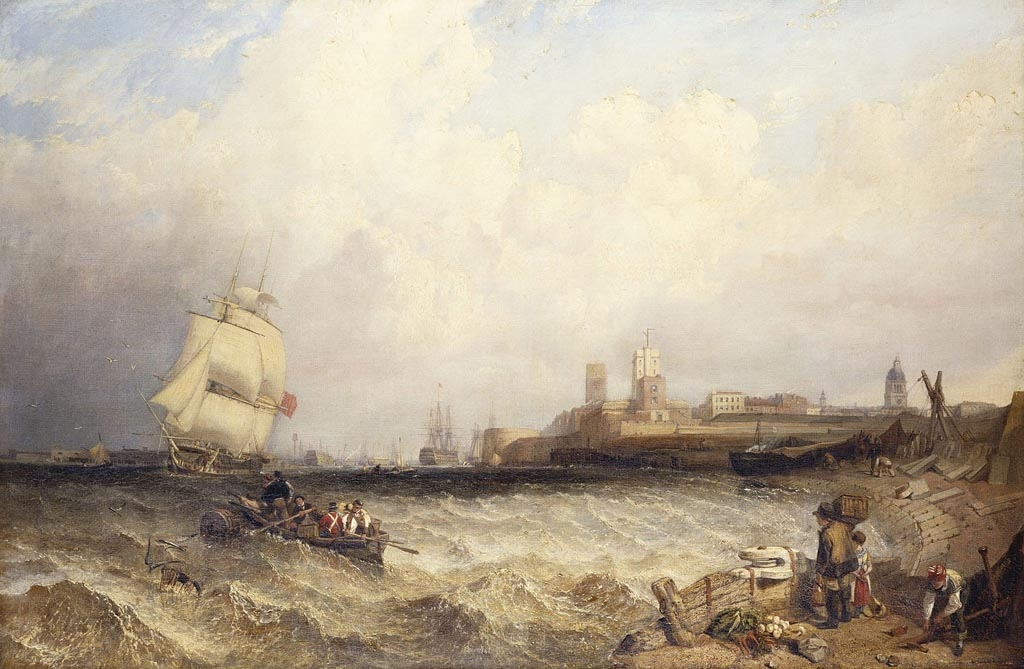
- Artist: Clarkson Stanfield
- Year: 1831
- Medium: Oil on canvas, landscape painting
- Dimensions: 95 cm × 143.2 cm (37 in × 56.4 in)
- Location: Royal Collection

Portsmouth Harbour is an oil on canvas landscape painting by the British artist Clarkson Stanfield, from 1831.

== History and description ==
It depicts a view of Portsmouth Harbour at the major British naval base of Portsmouth in Hampshire. A frigate is seen departing harbour in full sail. Visible on the right is the Church of St Thomas; in the centre are the Saluting Battery, Semaphore Tower, and Round Tower; and to the left is Blockhouse Point on the Gosport side. Prominent inside the harbour is HMS Victory, Lord Nelson's flagship during the Battle of Trafalgar.

The new King William IV had seen Stanfield's 1830 work Mount St Michael, Cornwall at the Royal Academy's Summer Exhibition at Somerset House. Impressed, he commissioned two works from the painter including this view of Portsmouth. A sailor in his youth, and recently having served as Lord High Admiral, William maintained a strong association with the Royal Navy. Both this and Stanfield's other work for the king The Opening of New London Bridge were exhibited together at the 1832 Summer Exhibition. While William was pleased with the Portsmouth painting, critical reception was more mixed. Both paintings remain in the Royal Collection.

== Bibliography ==
- Herrmann, Luke. Nineteenth Century British Painting. Charles de la Mare, 2000.
- Millar, Oliver. The Victorian Pictures in the Collection of Her Majesty the Queen. Cambridge University Press, 1992.
- Van Der Kiste, John. William IV: The Last Hanoverian King of Britain. Pen and Sword History, 2022.
- Van der Merwe, Pieter & Took, Roger. The Spectacular career of Clarkson Stanfield. Tyne and Wear County Council Museums, 1979.
