= A Market Boat on the Scheldt =

Painting by Clarkson Stanfield

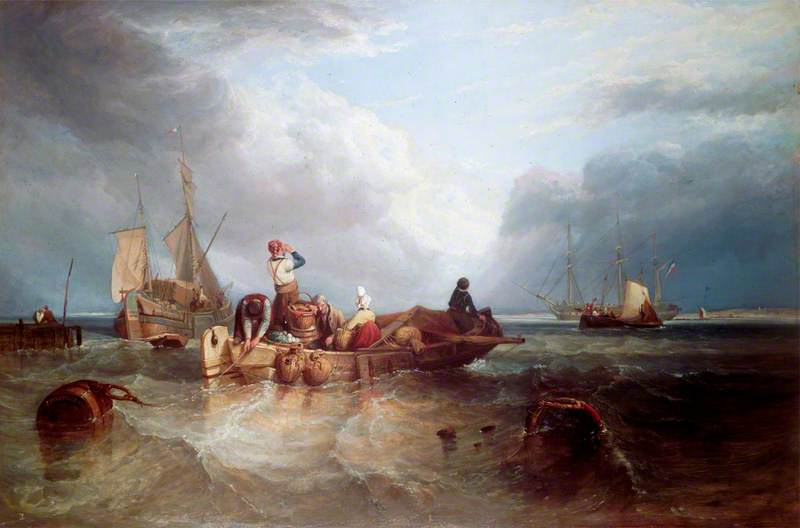
- Artist: Clarkson Stanfield
- Year: 1826
- Type: Oil on panel, landscape painting
- Dimensions: 82.9 cm × 124.4 cm (32.6 in × 49.0 in)
- Location: Victoria and Albert Museum; London

A Market Boat on the Scheldt is an 1826 oil painting by the British artist Clarkson Stanfield. A seascape, it depicts a boat on the River Scheldt transporting goods to market. Stanfield had served in the Royal Navy during the Napoleonic Wars and subsequently made his name as a scenic designer at the Theatre Royal, Drury Lane. The work was likely inspired by a trip he had made to the Netherlands in the summer of 1823. He displayed the painting at the British Institution's annual exhibition in London and it was the first one of his pictures to receive critical acclaim.

The painting is in the collection of the Victoria and Albert Museum in South Kensington, having been gifted by the art collector John Sheepshanks in 1857. it was one of several Stanfield paintings to form part of the large Sheepshanks Gift.

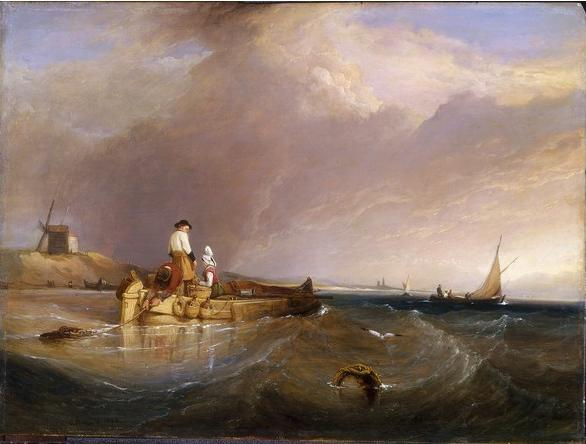
View on the Scheldt by Stanfield

The same year, Stanfield also produced View on the Scheldt which features a smaller version and an altered composition of the painting, and is also in the museum.

== Bibliography ==
- Parkinson, Ronald. Catalogue of British Oil Paintings 1820-1860. Victoria and Albert Museum, 1990.
- Van der Merwe, Pieter & Took, Roger. The Spectacular career of Clarkson Stanfield. Tyne and Wear County Council Museums, 1979.
