= Francis Stanfield =

English Roman Catholic priest, composer and hymnodist (1835–1914)

Father Francis Stansfield
- Parish Priest of Corpus Christi, Maiden Lane
- Archdiocese: Westminster

Personal details
- Born: 1835 London, England
- Died: 1914 (aged 78–79) London, England
- Denomination: Roman Catholic
- Parents: Clarkson Stanfield (father)
- Occupation: Priest; Composer; Hymnodist
- Education: St Edmund's College, Ware

Francis Stanfield (1835–1914) was an English Catholic priest, composer and hymnodist who worked in the Roman Catholic Archdiocese of Westminster and is noted for having written and composed several hymns including Sweet Sacrament Divine. He was the son of the painter Clarkson Stanfield.

== Life ==
Stanfield was born in London, one of the sons of the marine painter, and friend of Charles Dickens, Clarkson Frederick Stanfield.

He was educated at St Edmund's College, Ware. After ordination, he was stationed in Hertford. He then became principally in conducting missions and retreats. He was later priest in charge at Old Hall Green.

Stanfield wrote over a dozen hymns for various occasions. He is noted as the author of the hymn Sweet Sacrament Divine for which he also composed the music, the tune being called "Divine Mysteries." His hymn "Hear Thy Children Gentle Jesus, While We Breathe Our Evening Prayer" uses the tune Drakes Broughton (by Elgar).
