= Mount St Michael, Cornwall =

Painting by Clarkson Stanfield

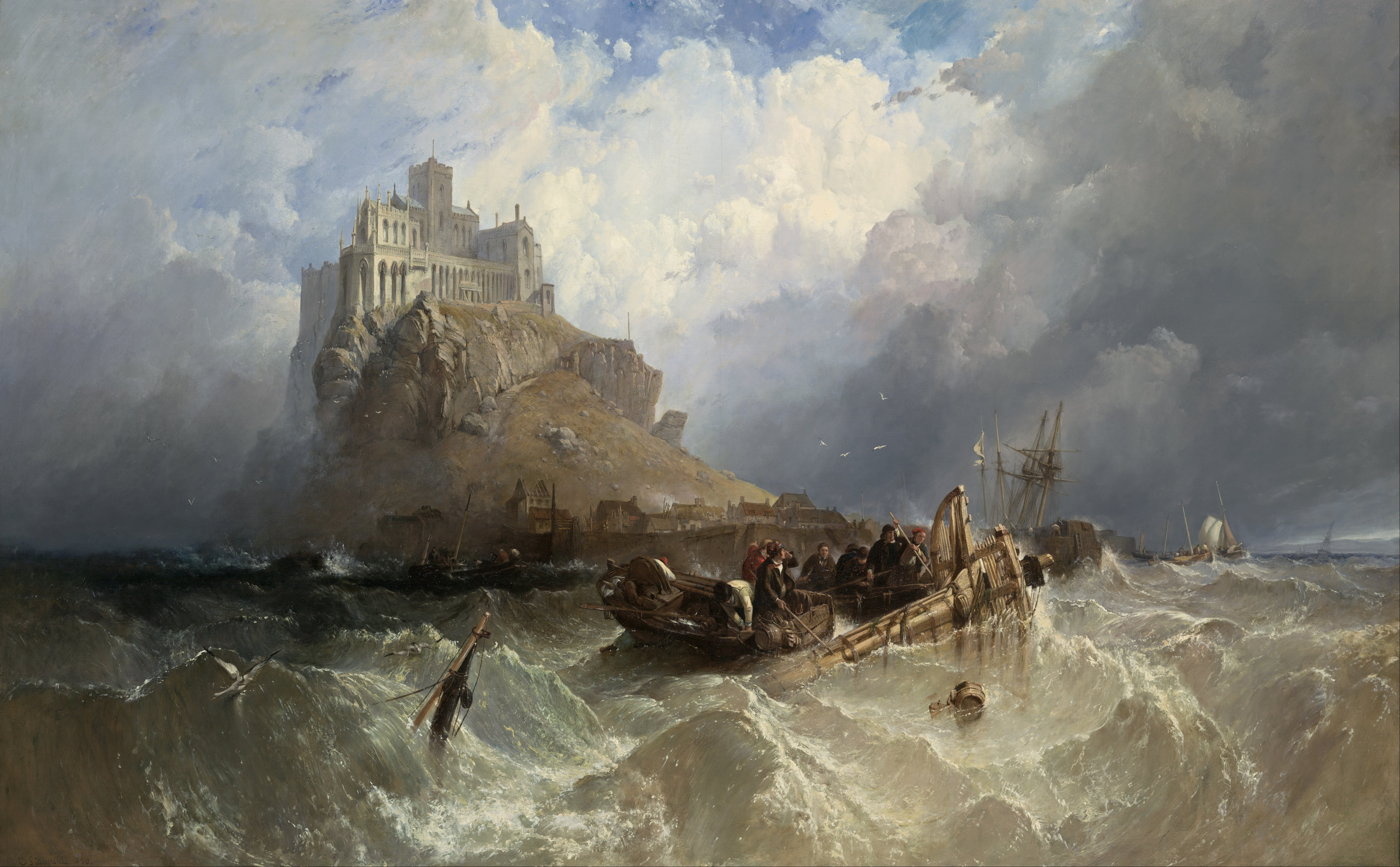
- Artist: Clarkson Stanfield
- Year: 1830
- Medium: Oil on canvas, landscape painting
- Dimensions: 153.2 cm × 244 cm (60.3 in × 96 in)
- Location: National Gallery of Victoria, Melbourne

Mount St Michael, Cornwall is an 1830 landscape painting by the British artist Clarkson Stanfield. Stanfield, a former sailor, specialised in marine paintings. This view of St Michael's Mount in stormy weather was a breakthrough for him. It was produced when Romanticism was at its height. It remains one of his best known works along with his The Battle of Trafalgar (1836).

It was exhibited at the Royal Academy's Summer Exhibition of 1830 and at the British Institution in 1831. Impressed by the painting, William IV commissioned two major works from him Portsmouth Harbour and The Opening of New London Bridge. Today it is in the collection of the National Gallery of Victoria in Melbourne. In 1846 Stanfield depicted another version of the location The Royal Yacht Passing St Michael's Mount.

== See also ==
- St Michael's Mount, Cornwall, an 1834 painting by J.M.W. Turner

== Bibliography ==
- Gott, Ted & Benson, Laurie. 19th Century Painting and Sculpture in the International Collections of the National Gallery of Victoria. National Gallery of Victoria, 2003.
- Herrmann, Luke. Nineteenth Century British Painting. Charles de la Mare, 2000.
- Isham, Howard F. Image of the Sea: Oceanic Consciousness in the Romantic Century. Peter Lang, 2004.
- Van der Merwe, Pieter & Took, Roger. The Spectacular career of Clarkson Stanfield. Tyne and Wear County Council Museums, 1979.
