= 1837 in art =

Events from the year 1837 in art.

== Events ==
- January 20 – Death of the neo-classical architect Sir John Soane gives effect to the creation of his London house as Sir John Soane's Museum.
- May 1 – The Royal Academy Exhibition of 1837 opens at the National Gallery in London, the first to be held following the Academy's move from its former home Somerset House
- June 1 – The Government-funded Normal School of Design, predecessor of the Royal College of Art, begins classes at Somerset House in London.
- June 10 – Galerie des Batailles at the Palace of Versailles in France, designed by Pierre-François-Léonard Fontaine with Frédéric Nepveu for the display of sculptures and historical paintings, is opened.
- July – Edward Lear leaves Knowsley Hall in England to travel to Rome.
- Art Union of London founded.
- Marie Louise Élisabeth Vigée-Lebrun publishes the second volume of her memoirs.

== Awards ==
- Prix de Rome (for painting) – Thomas Couture
- Knighthood – Augustus Wall Callcott

== Works ==
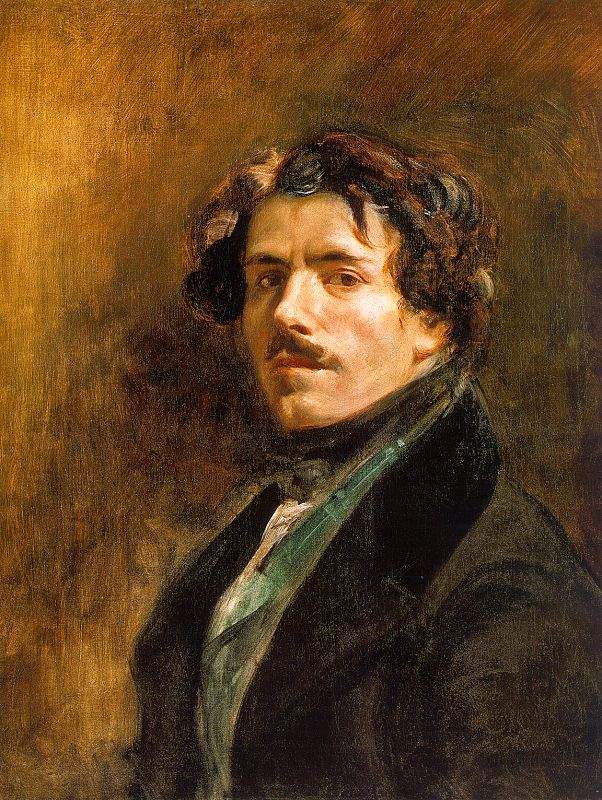
Delacroix self-portrait

- Jean Alaux – The Storming of Valenciennes
- Ditlev Blunck – Danske kunstnere på et romersk osteri ("Danish Artists at the Osteria la Gonsola, Rome")
- John Burnet – Greenwich Pensioners Commemorating Trafalgar
- Léon Cogniet – The Battle of Heliopolis
- Joseph-Désiré Court –The Wedding of Leopold I of Belgium and Louise of Orléans
- David d'Angers – Philopoemen Wounded (sculpture)
- Alexandre-Gabriel Decamps – The Punishment of the Hooks
- Eugène Delacroix
  - murals in Salon du Roi, Chamber of Deputies of France, Palais Bourbon, Paris (completed)
  - Self-portrait
- Benjamin Duterrau – portrait of Derrimut
- William Dyce – Francesca da Rimini
- William Etty –
  - Mars, Venus and Cupid
  - The Sirens and Ulysses
- Caspar David Friedrich – Landscape with Owl, Grave, and Coffin
- Nicolas Gosse – Napoleon Receiving the Queen of Prussia at Tilsit
- Edwin Landseer – The Old Shepherd's Chief Mourner
- Charles Robert Leslie – Florizel and Perdita
- John Martin
  - Manfred and the Witch of the Alps
  - Manfred on the Jungfrau
- Wijnand Nuijen – Shipwreck off a Rocky Coast
- Henri Félix Emmanuel Philippoteaux – The Capitulation of the Citadel at Antwerp
- Henry William Pickersgill – Portrait of John Conroy
- David Roberts – London from Fleet Street
- Camille Roqueplan – Van Dyck in London
- Juan Mauricio Rugendas – Battle of Maipú
- Geskel Saloman – portrait of Smetana
- Hendrik Scheffer – The Battle of Cassel
- Clarkson Stanfield
  - Beilstein on the Moselle
  - On the Scheldt near Leiskenshoeck
- Joseph von Führich – The Road to Emmaus Appearance
- David Wilkie
  - Josephine and the Fortune-Teller
  - Portrait of William IV

== Births ==
- January – Daniel Cottier, Scottish artist and designer (died 1891)
- January 1 – Adolf Mosengel, German landscape painter (died 1885)
- January 27 – Tomioka Tessai, Japanese painter and calligrapher in Meiji period (died 1924)
- February 12 – Thomas Moran, English-born American landscape painter of the Hudson River School (died 1926)
- March 27 – John MacWhirter, Scottish landscape painter (died 1911)
- April 10 – Tranquillo Cremona, Italian painter (died 1878)
- May 8 – Alphonse Legros, French painter and etcher (died 1911)
- June 8 – Ivan Kramskoi, Russian painter and art critic (died 1887)
- July 4 – Carolus-Duran, French painter (died 1917)
- December 18 – Ernest Hoschedé, French businessman and collector of Impressionist paintings (died 1891)

== Deaths ==
- January 11 – Baron François Gérard, French painter (born 1770)
- January 29 – Andrew Plimer, British artist specialised in portrait miniatures (born 1763)
- February 8 – Ernst Willem Jan Bagelaar, Dutch engraver (born 1775)
- February 17 – Johann Baptist von Lampi the Younger, Austrian portrait painter (born 1775)
- February 27 – Françoise-Jeanne Ridderbosch, Belgian painter and engraver (born 1754)
- March 8 – Domingos Sequeira, Portuguese painter (born 1768)
- March 16 – François-Xavier Fabre, French painter of historical subjects (born 1766)
- March 31 – John Constable, English landscape painter (born 1776)
- May 18 – Marguerite Gérard, French painter and etcher (born 1761)
- August – Henry Behnes, English sculptor (born 1800
- August 9 – Xavier Sigalon, French painter (born 1787)
- September 18 – Pietro Fontana, Italian engraver (born 1762)
- December 28 – Boris Orlovsky, Russian sculptor (born 1793)
- date unknown
  - Juliane Wilhelmine Bause, German landscape etcher (born 1768)
  - Thomas Richmond, English miniature-painter (born 1771)
  - Charles Henry Schwanfelder, English animal, landscape and portrait painter (born 1774)
  - Yi Jaegwan, Korean genre works painter in the late Joseon period (born 1783)
