= Royal Academy Exhibition of 1837 =

1837 art exhibition in London

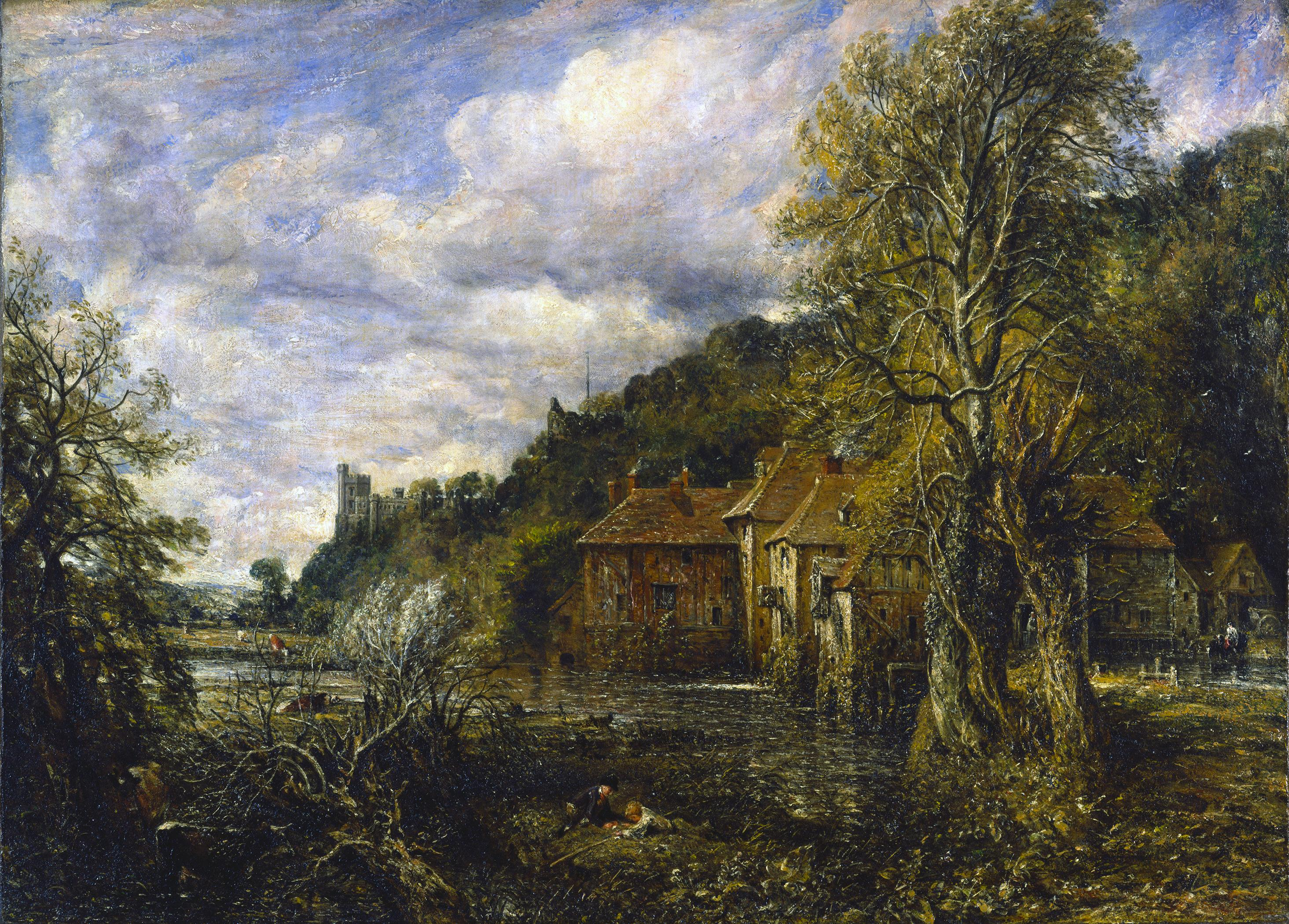
Arundel Mill and Castle by John Constable

The Royal Academy Exhibition of 1837 was an art exhibition held in London between 1 May and 22 July 1837. It was the sixty ninth annual Summer Exhibition of the Royal Academy of Arts and the first to be held at the National Gallery following a move from Somerset House, the Academy's home since 1780. The new gallery was designed by the architect William Wilkins in Greek Revival style. When the exhibition began it was not fully completed. Designed for the Academy to share the building with the recently established National Gallery, critical reaction to the new building was almost universally negative. While the Exhibition was ongoing the reigning monarch William IV was succeeded by his niece Victoria on 20 June, beginning the Victorian era.

The exhibition was the first time in 34 years that Constable had not appeared due to his death on 31 March. However his friend Charles Robert Leslie submitted the artist's final major work Arundel Mill and Castle on his behalf. Constable's former rival J.M.W. Turner was on the hanging committee and submitted four works of his own.

David Wilkie displayed a portrait painting of William IV while Martin Archer Shee, the President of the Royal Academy, exhibited his Portrait of Queen Adelaide. Wilkie also displayed history paintings including The Escape of Mary Queen of Scots from Lochleven Castle and Josephine and the Fortune-Teller George Frederic Watts made his debut at the Academy with The Wounded Heron.

In sculpture John Gibson submitted Hylas Surprised by the Naiades, now in the Tate Britain.

== Gallery ==
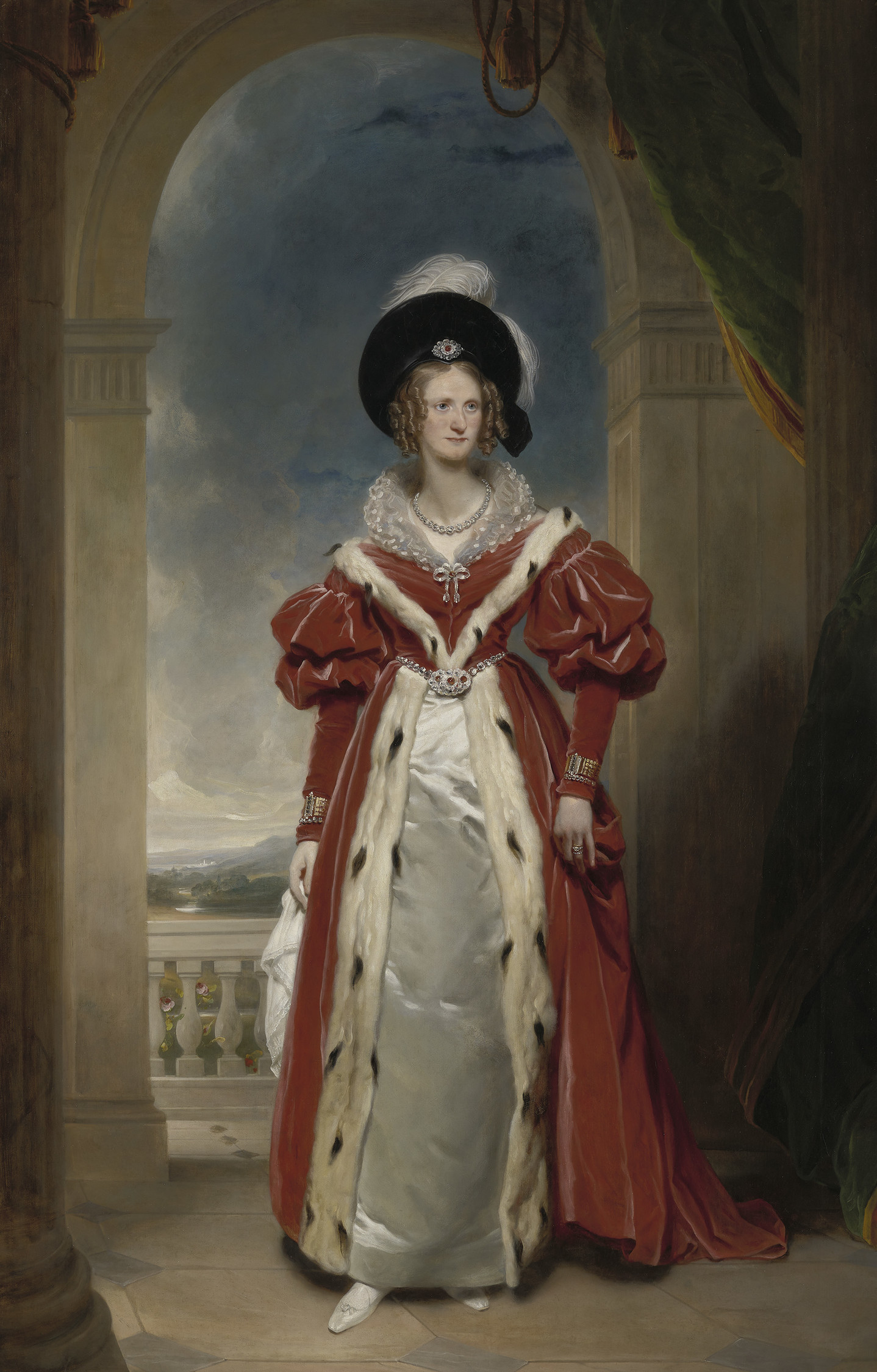
Portrait of Queen Adelaide by Martin Archer Shee

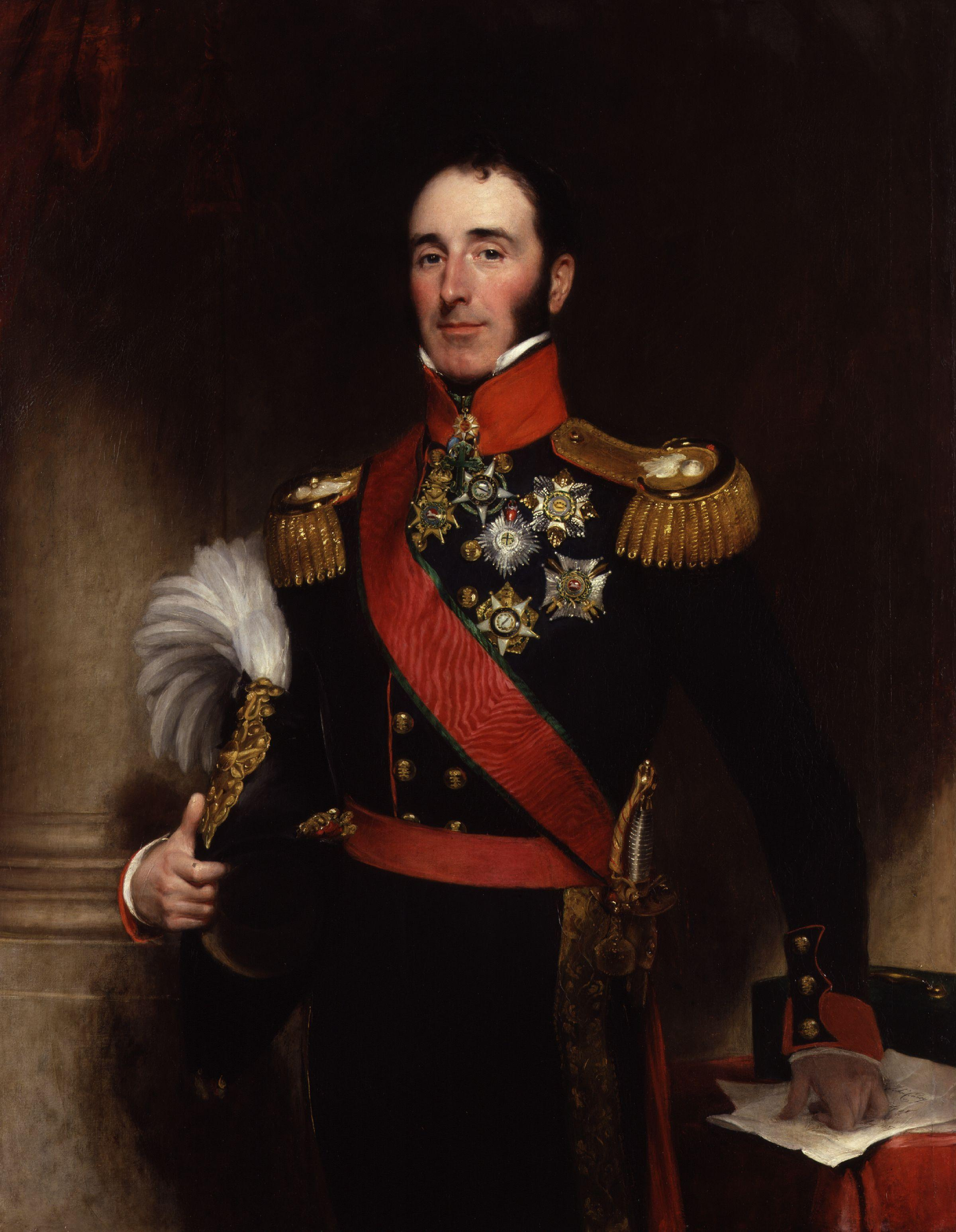
Portrait of John Conroy by Henry William Pickersgill

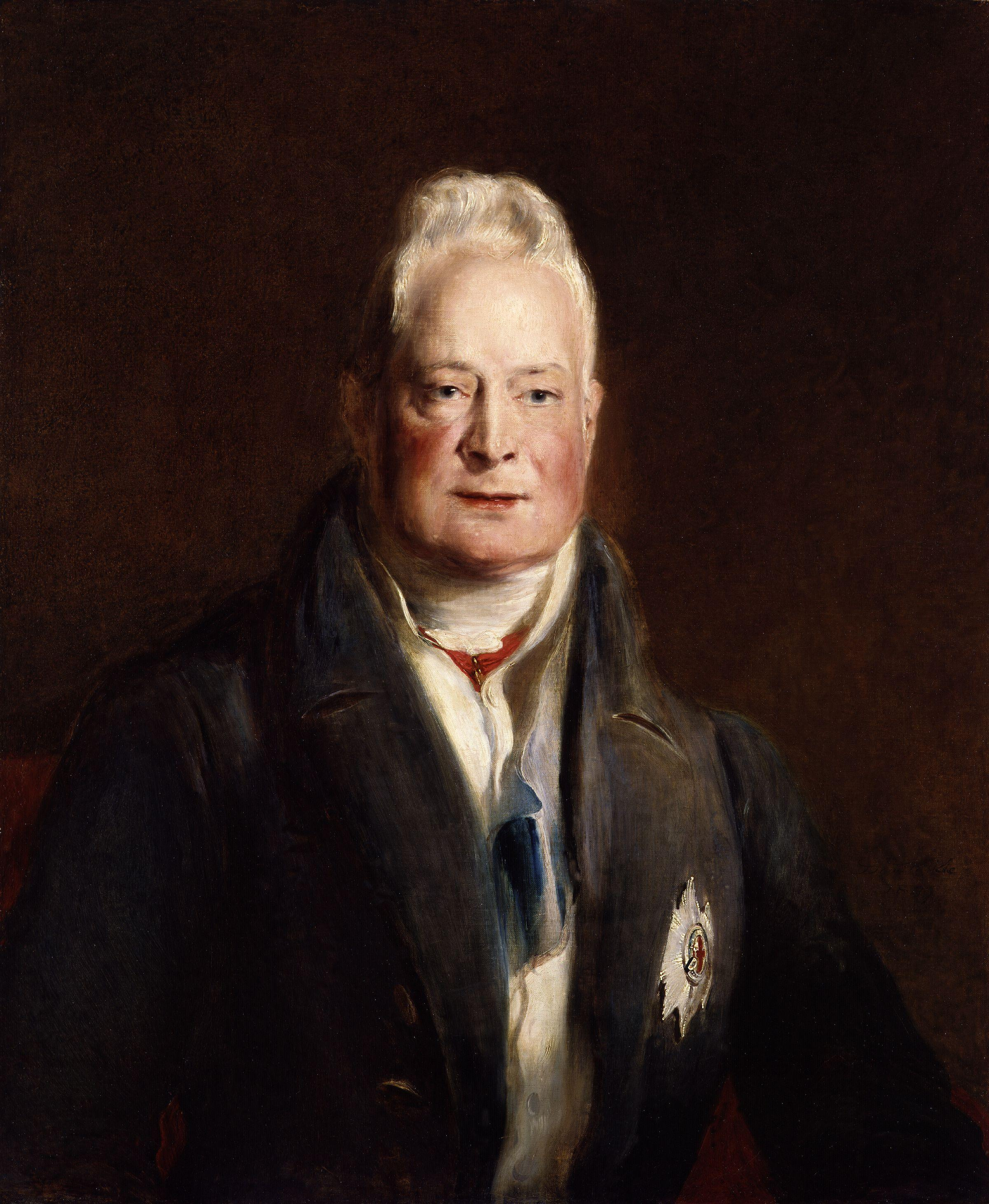
Portrait of William IV by David Wilkie

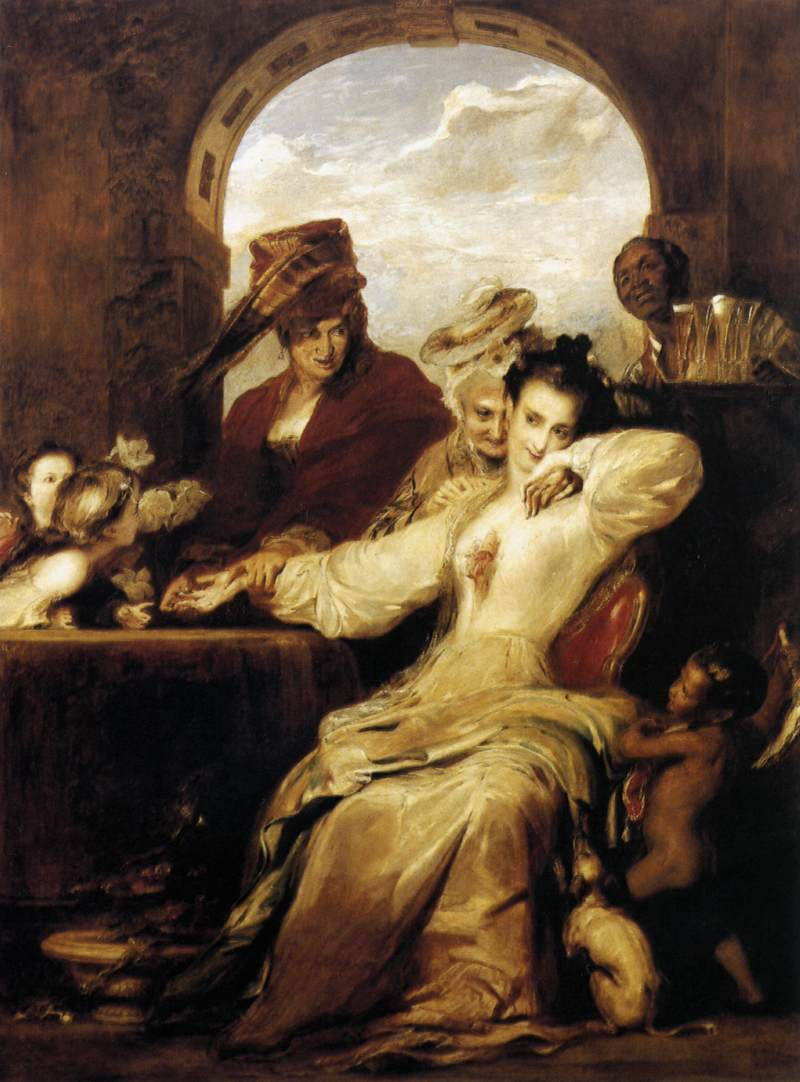
Josephine and the Fortune-Teller by David Wilkie

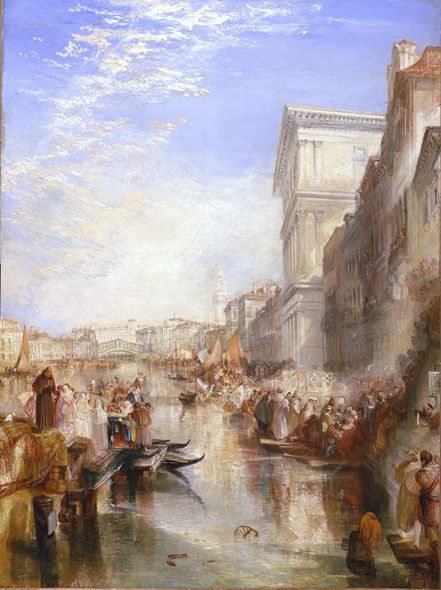
The Grand Canal, Venice by J.M.W. Turner

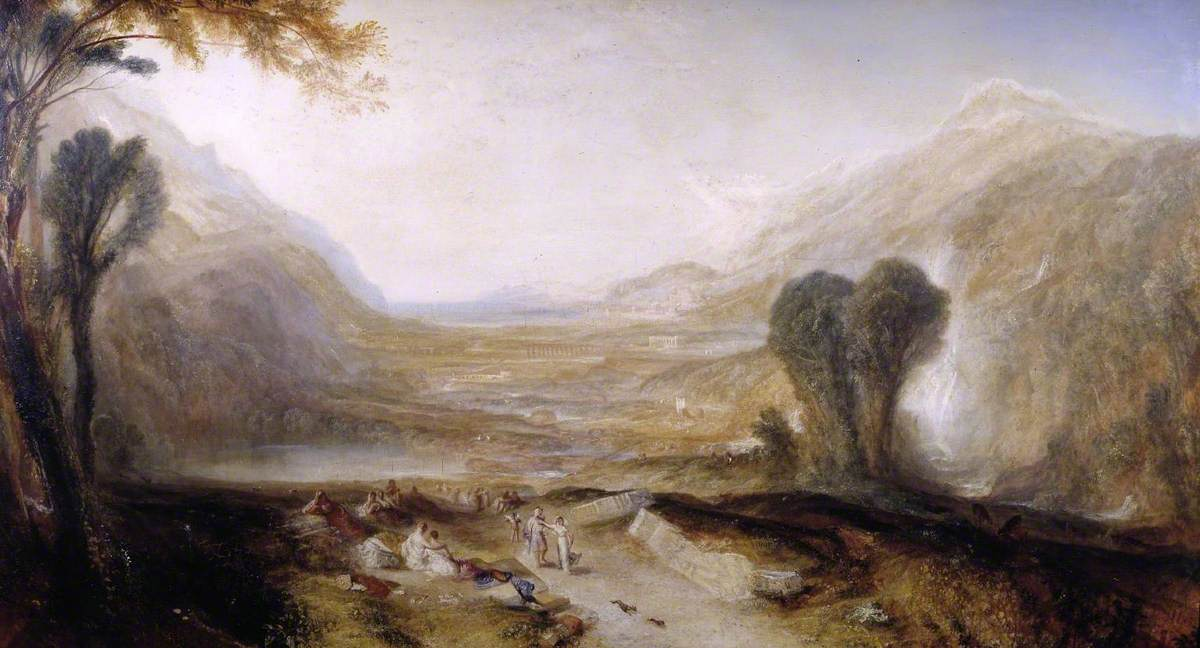
Story of Apollo and Daphne by J.M.W. Turner

Valley of Aosta, Snowstorm, Avalanche, and Thunderstorm by J.M.W. Turner

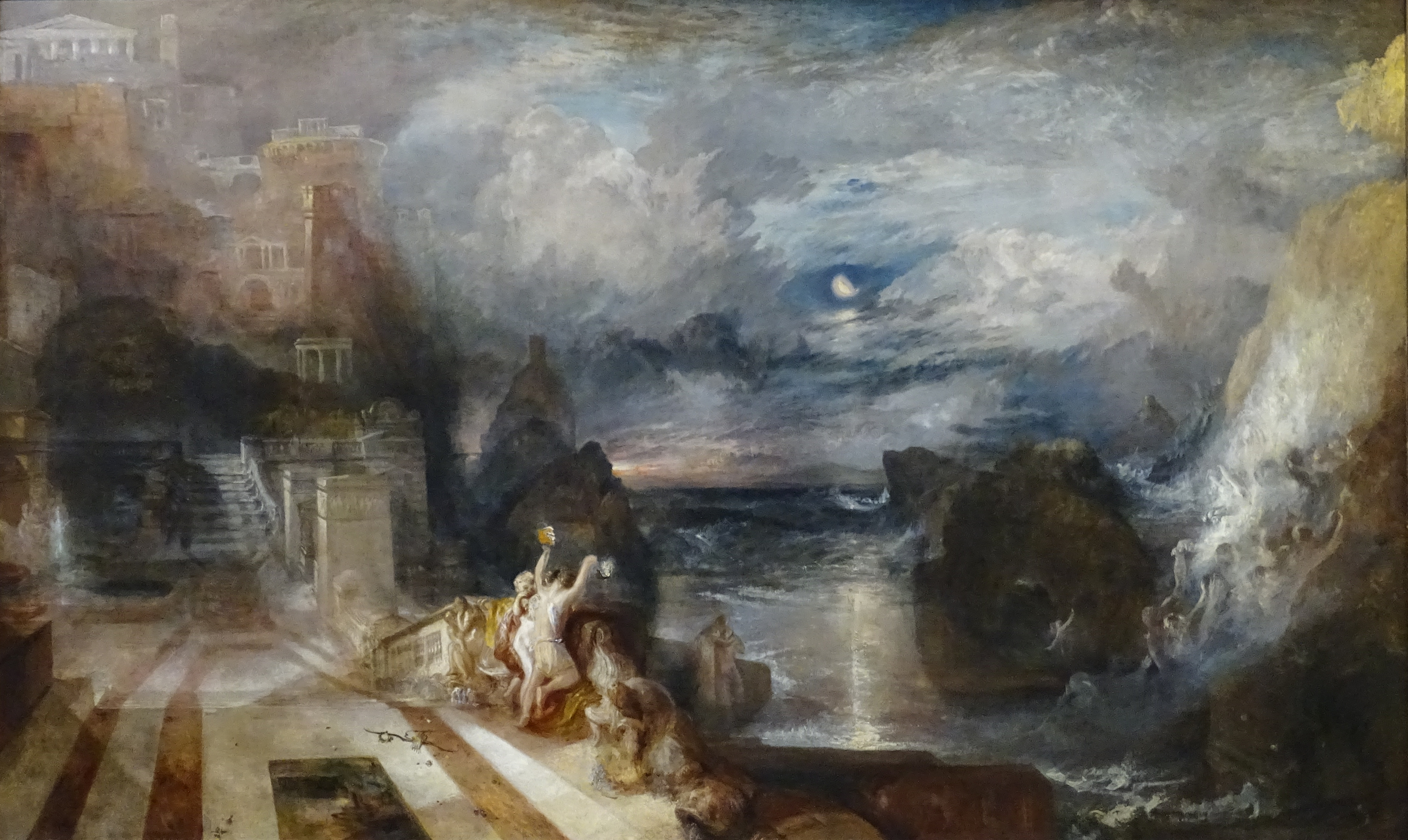
The Parting of Hero and Leander by J.M.W. Turner

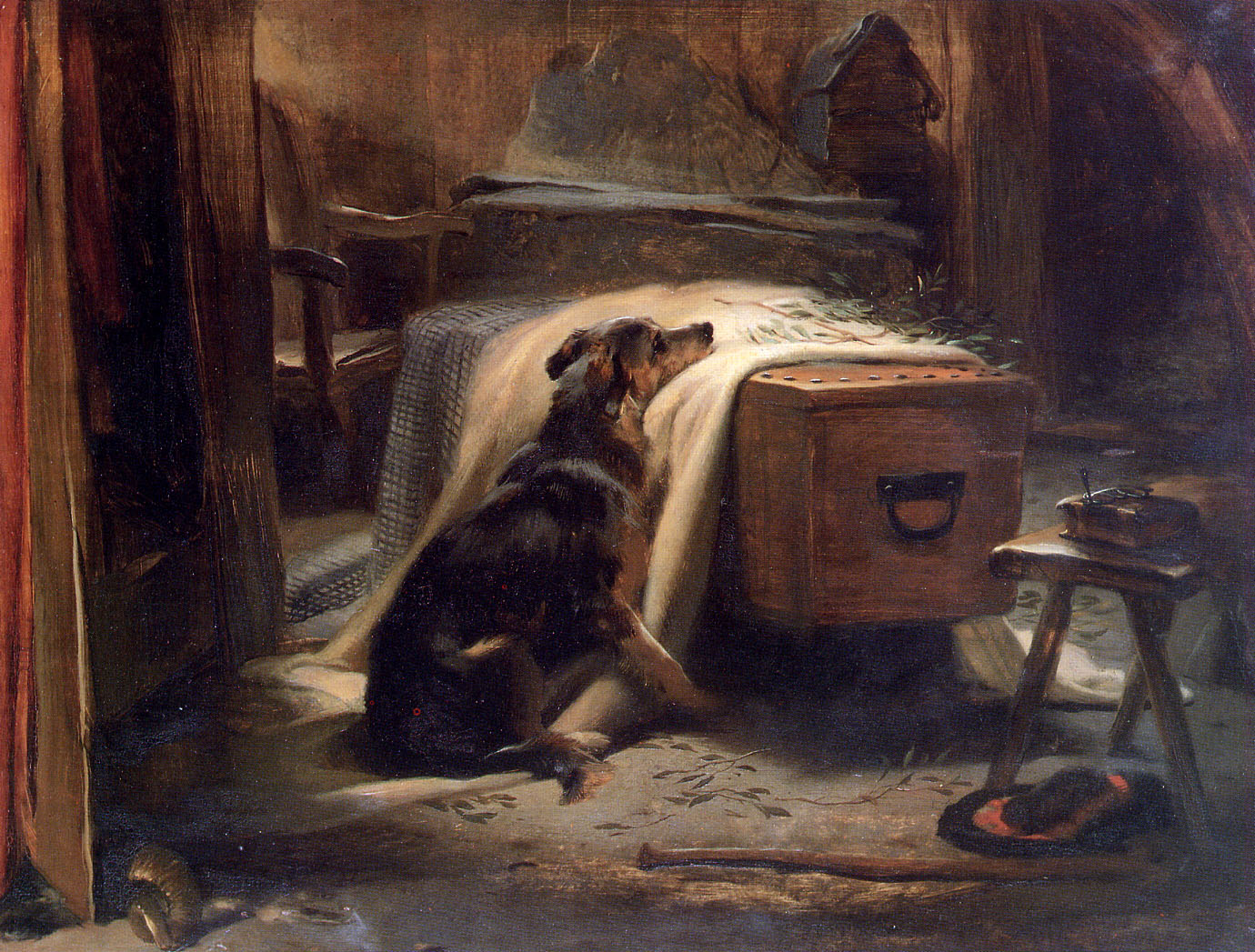
The Old Shepherd's Chief Mourner by Edwin Landseer

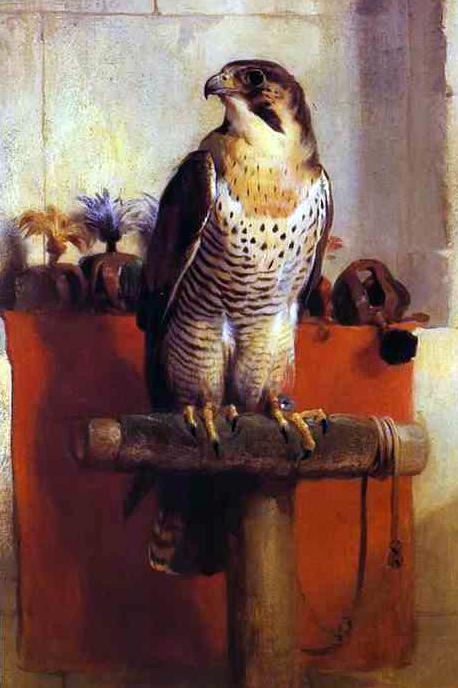
Falcon by Edwin Landseer

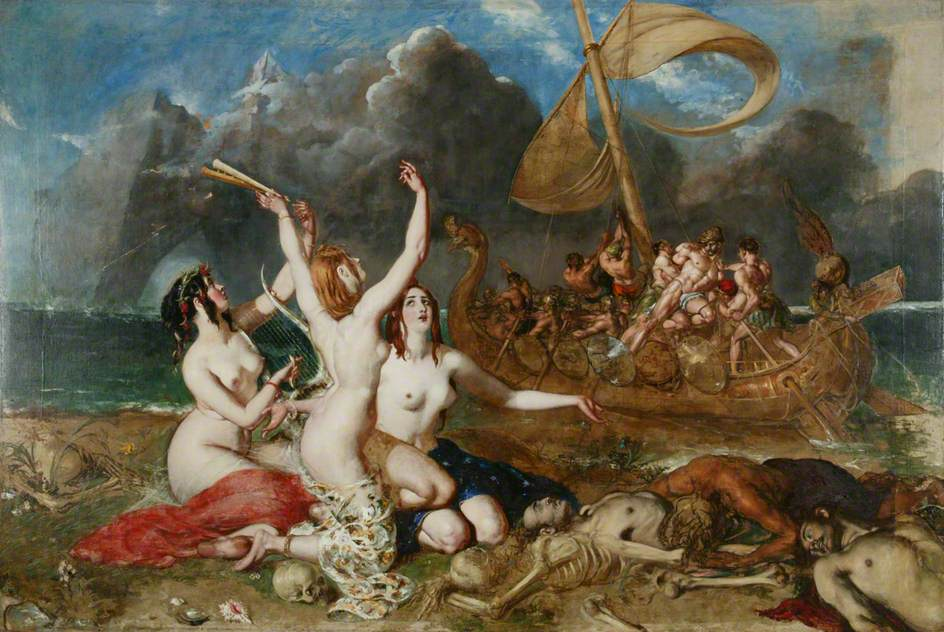
The Sirens and Ulysses by William Etty

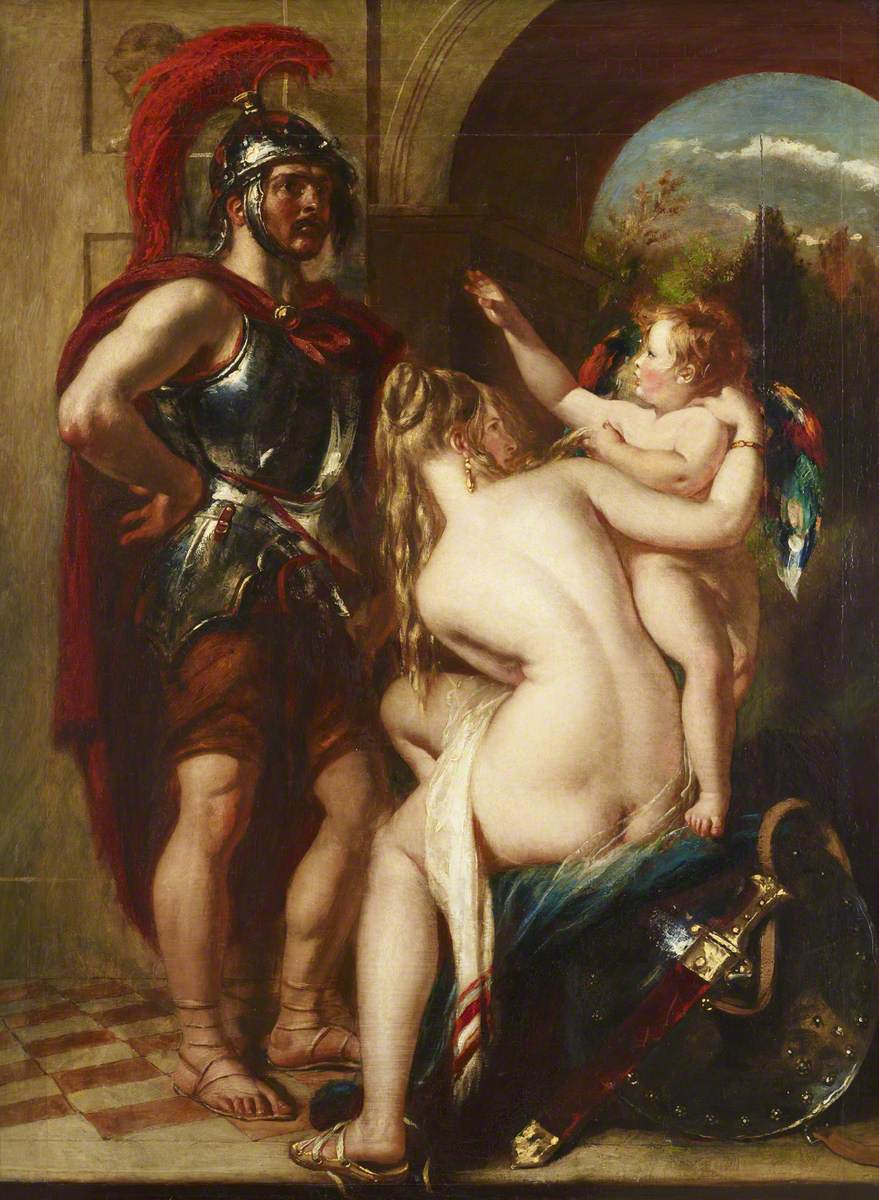
Mars, Venus and Cupid by William Etty

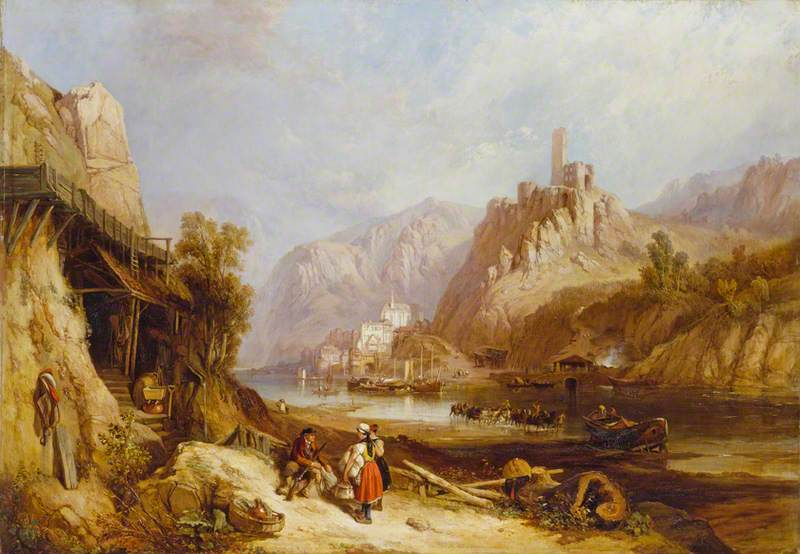
Beilstein on the Moselle by Clarkson Stanfield

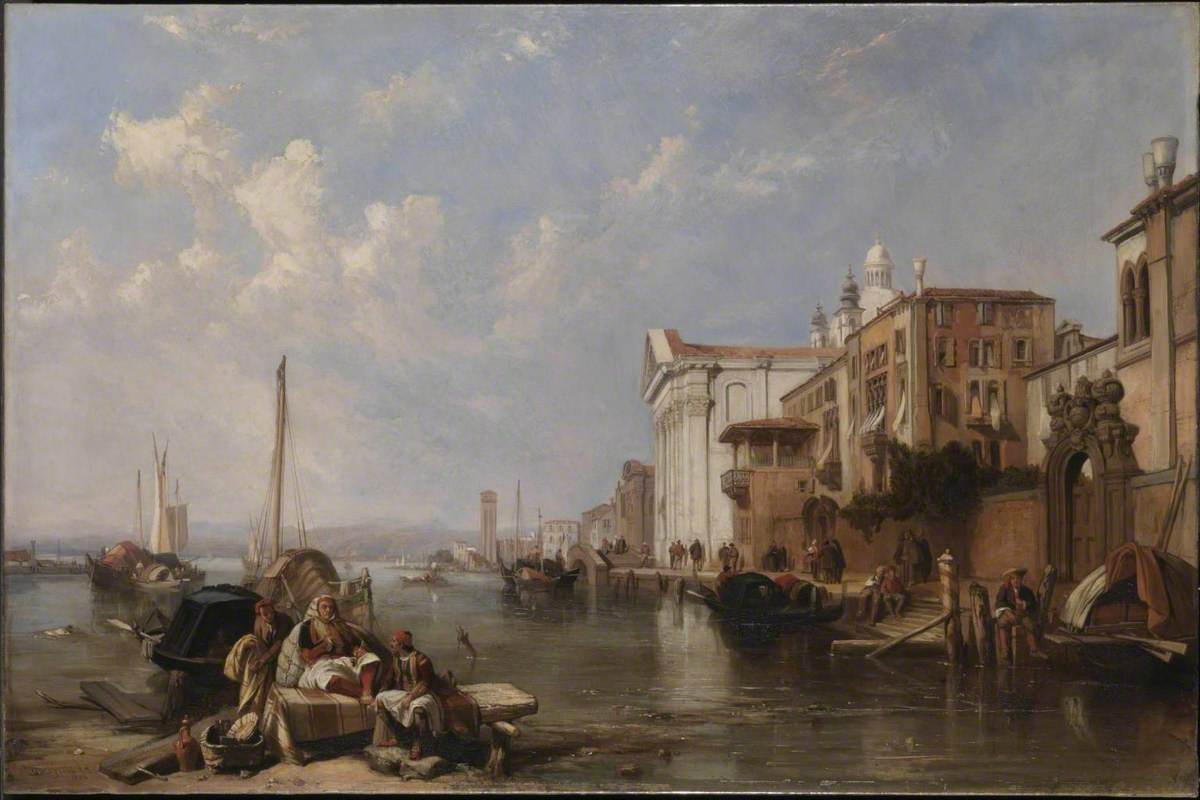
The Canal of the Guidecca, and the Church of the Gesuati, Venice by Clarkson Stanfield

The Coast of Normandy near Gonville by Clarkson Stanfield

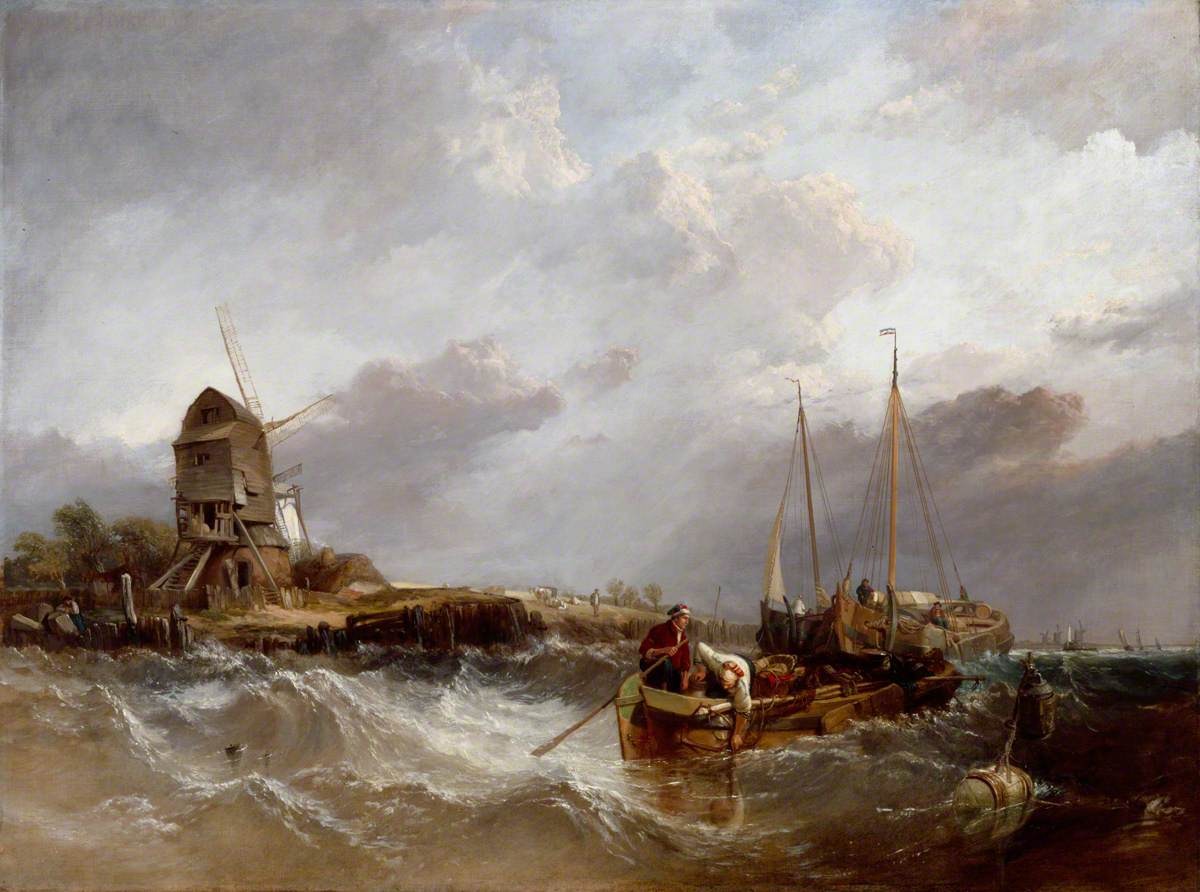
On the Scheldt near Leiskenshoeck, A Squally Day by Clarkson Stanfield

Santa Maria della Salute, Venice by George Belton Moore

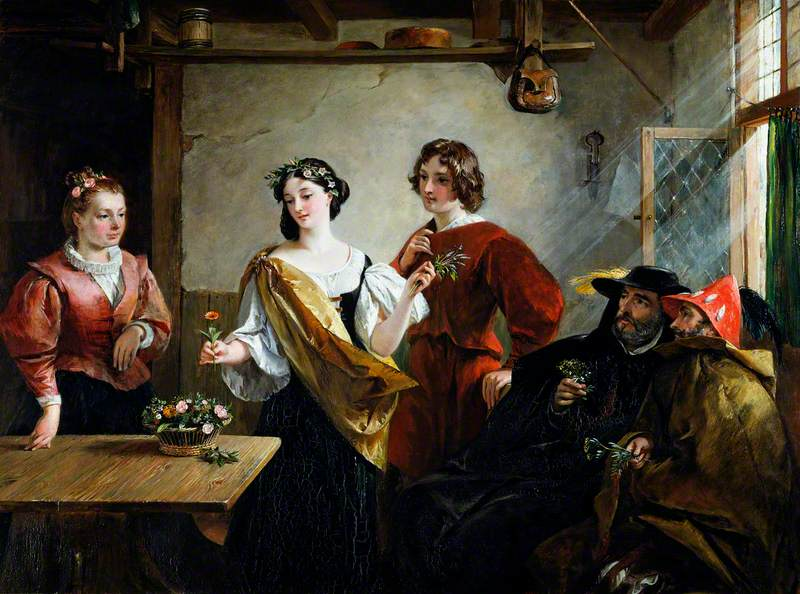
Florizel and Perdita by Charles Robert Leslie

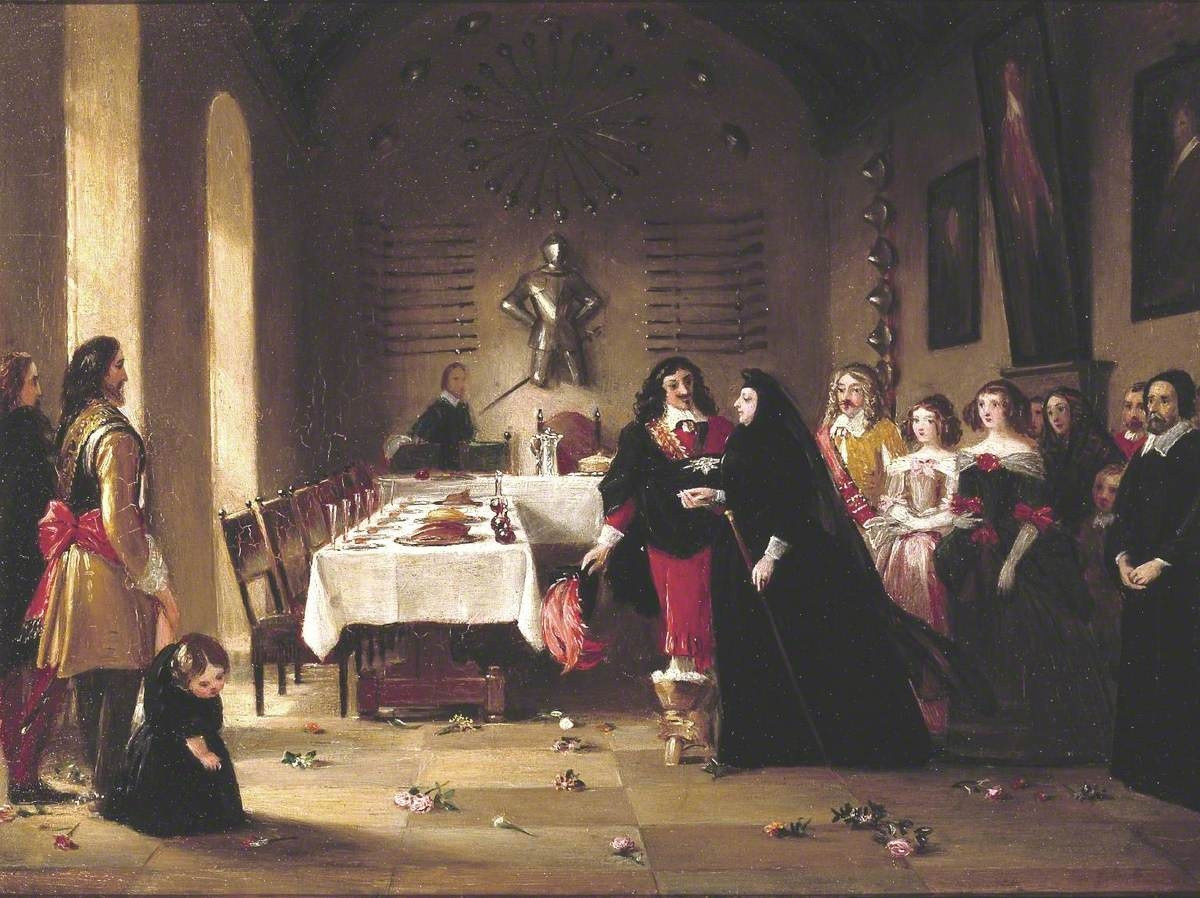
Sketch for Charles II and Lady Bellenden by Charles Robert Leslie

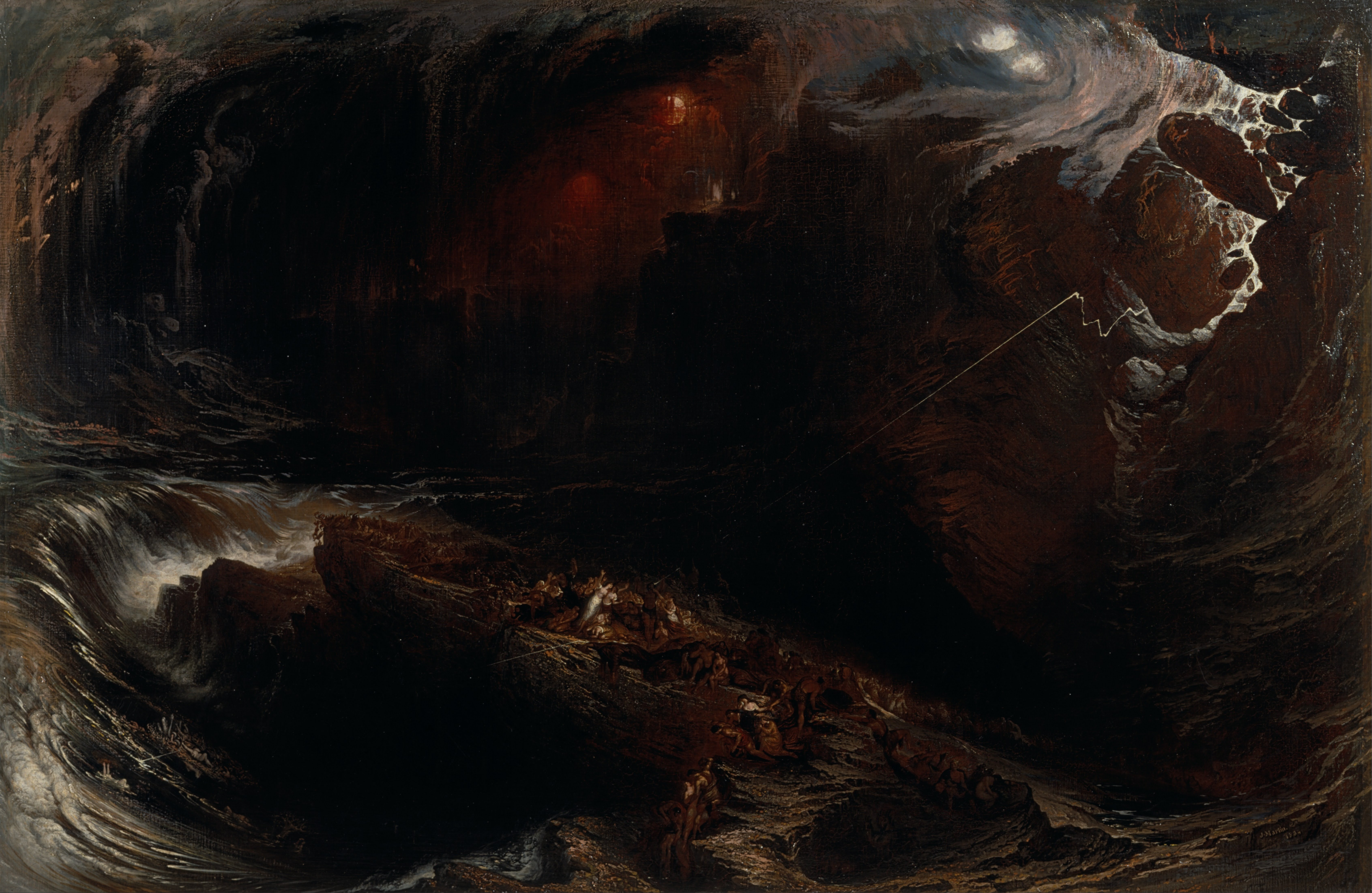
The Deluge by John Martin

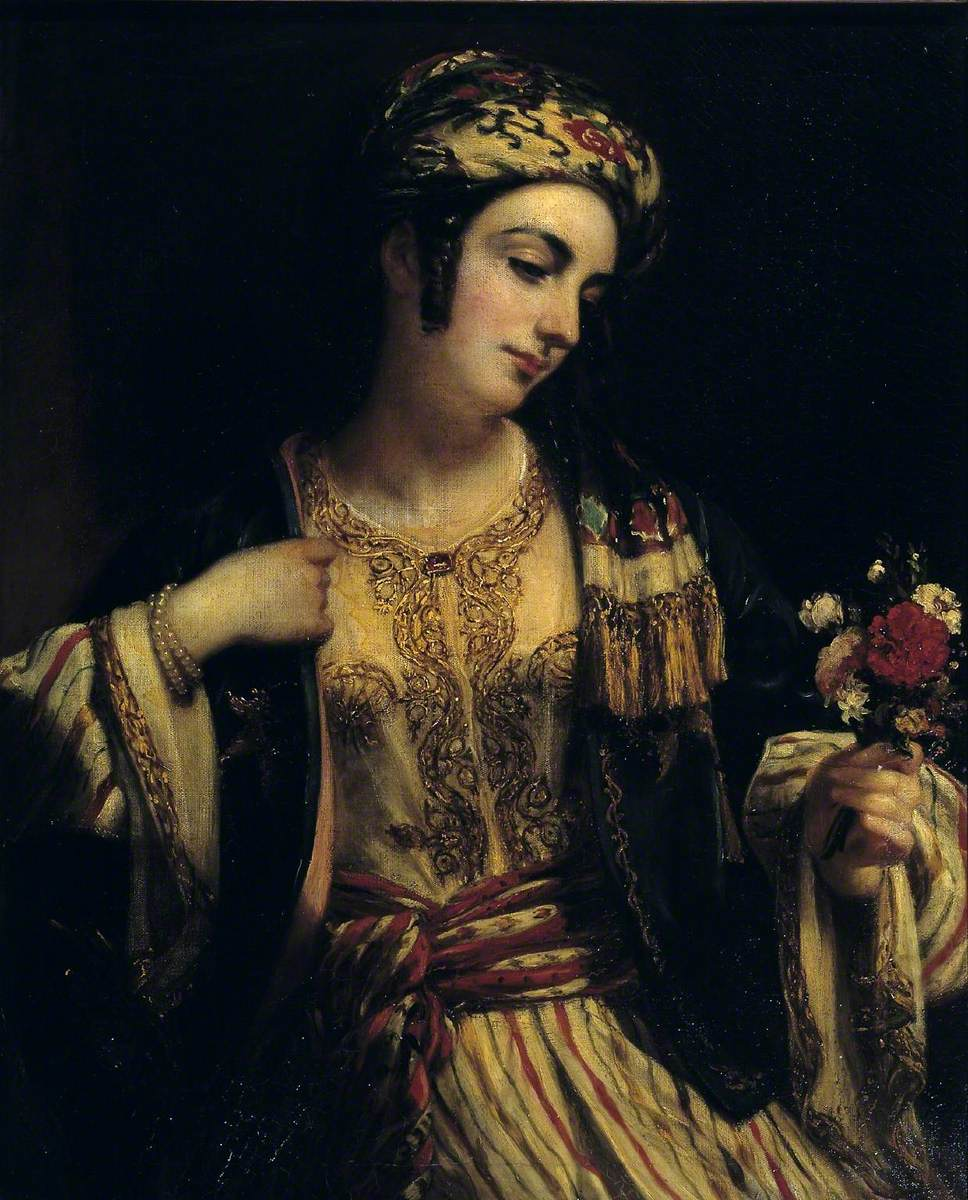
A Syrian Maid by Henry William Pickersgill

The Toy Seller by William Mulready

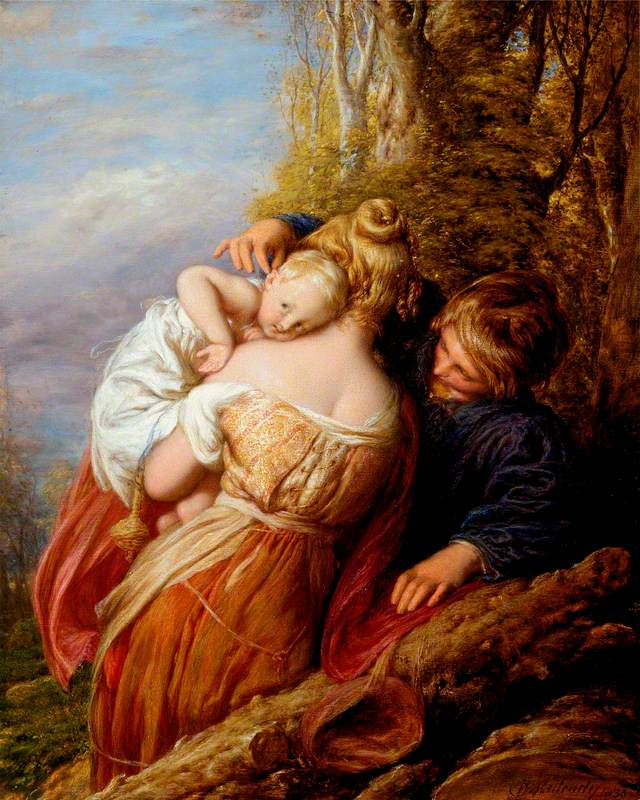
Brother and Sister by William Mulready

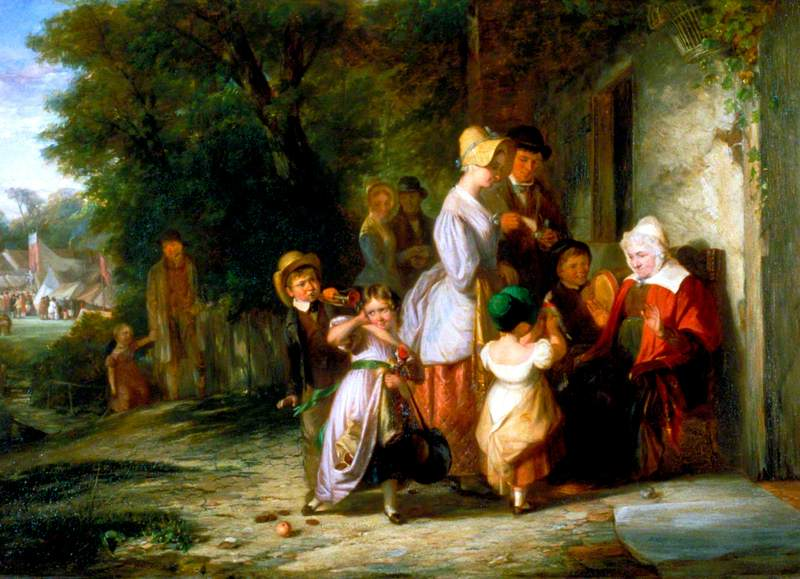
Returning from the Fair by Thomas Webster

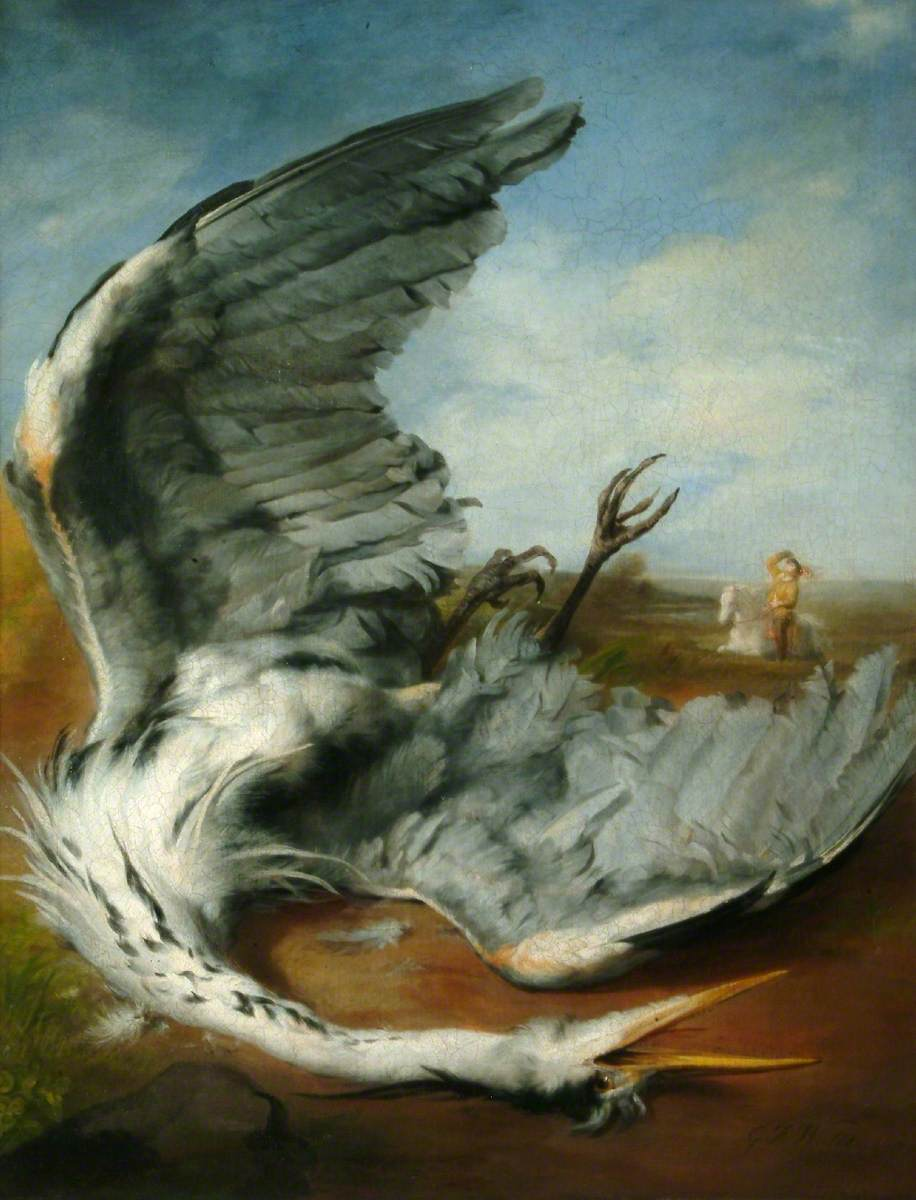
The Wounded Heron by George Frederic Watts

The Cottar's Saturday Night by David Wilkie

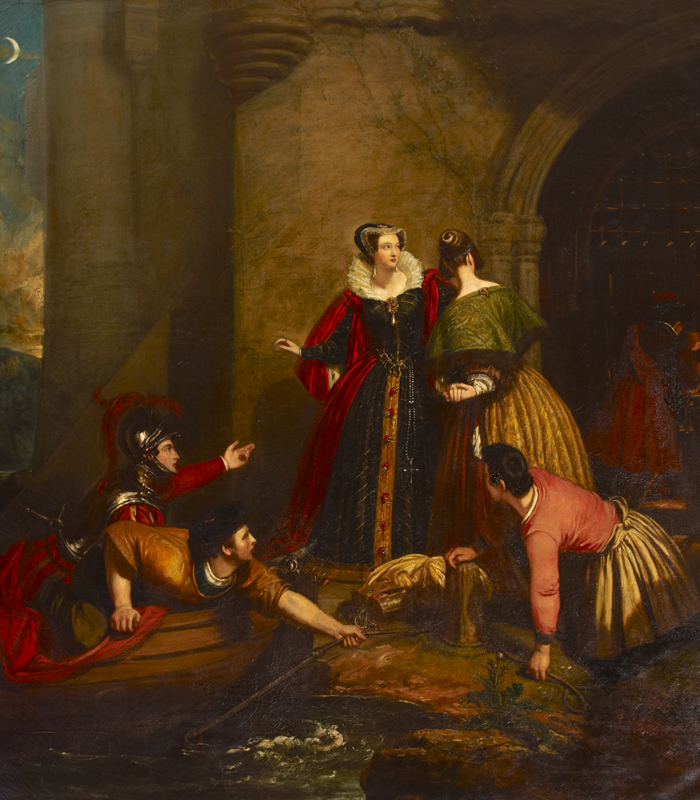
Mary, Queen of Scots Leaving Lochleven Castle by Edward Daniel Leahy

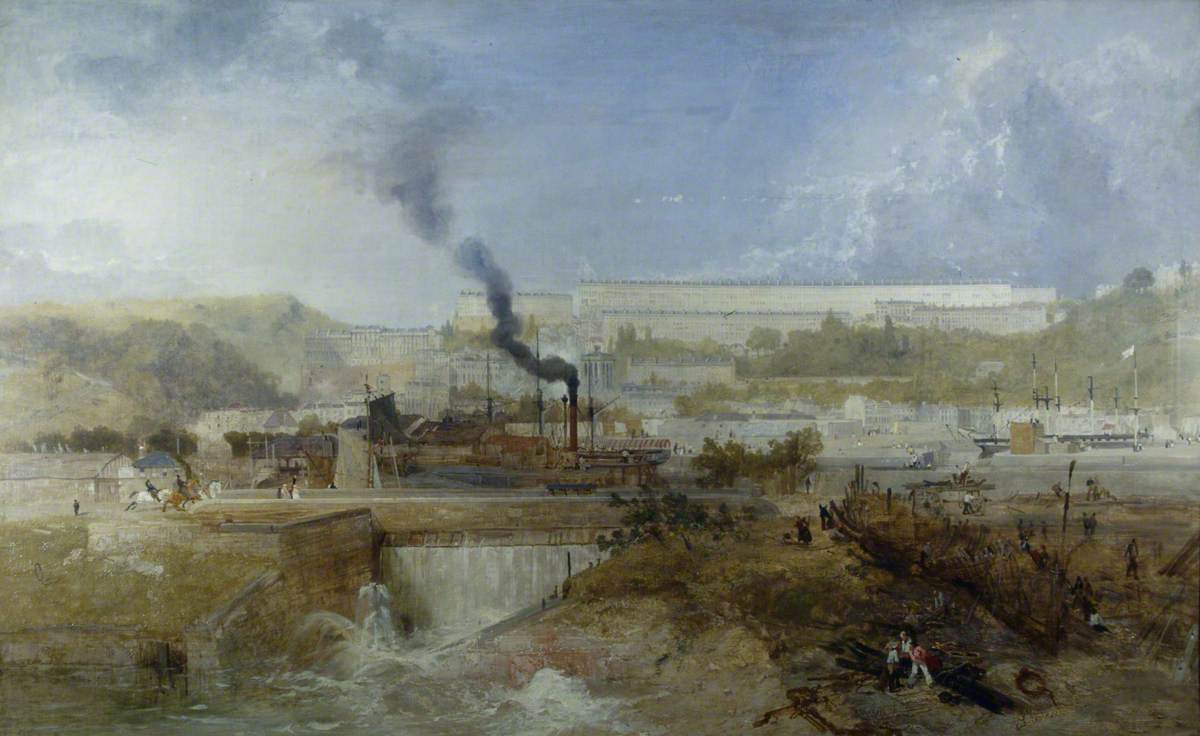
Clifton from the Overfall Dam by James Baker Pyne

Glengarriff, County Cork by Thomas Creswick

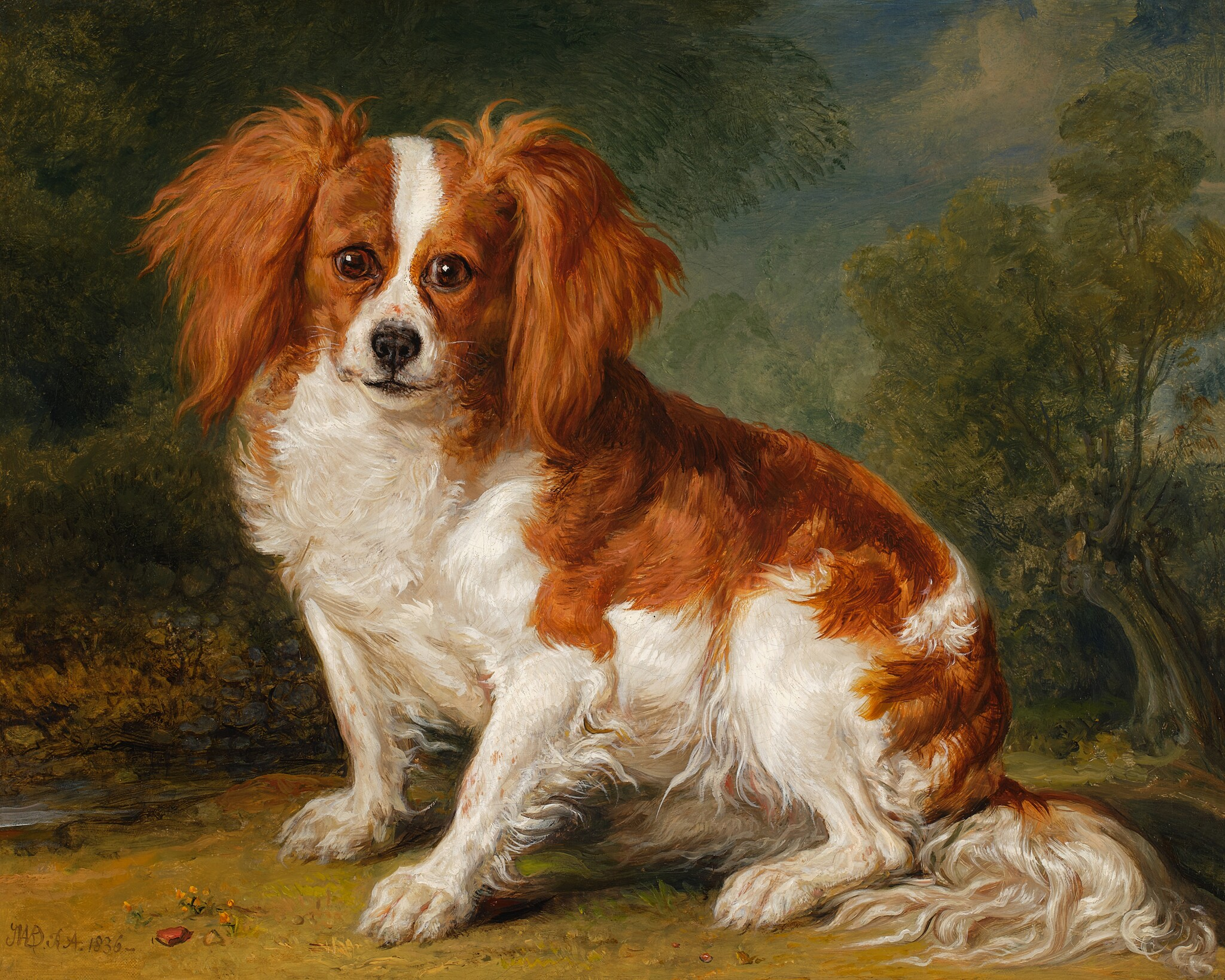
Portrait of Dash, the Artist's Dog by James Ward

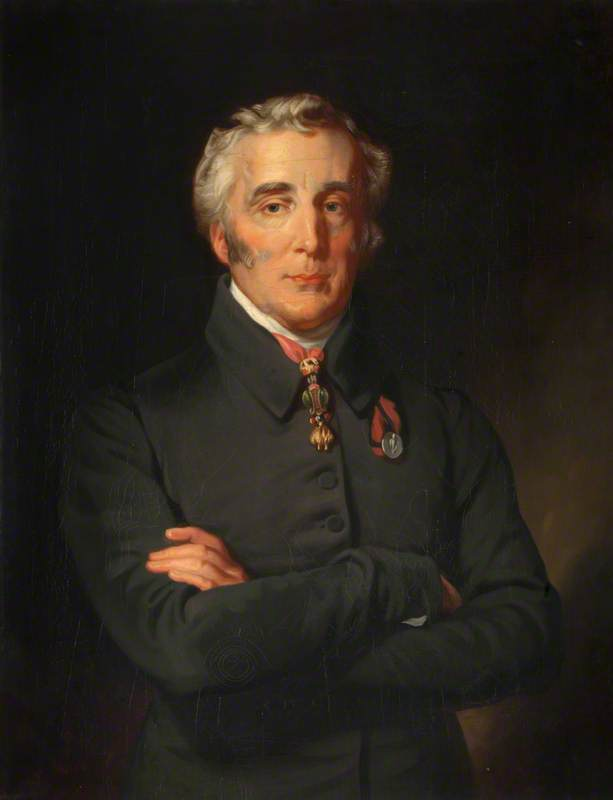
Portrait of the Duke of Wellington by Henry Perronet Briggs

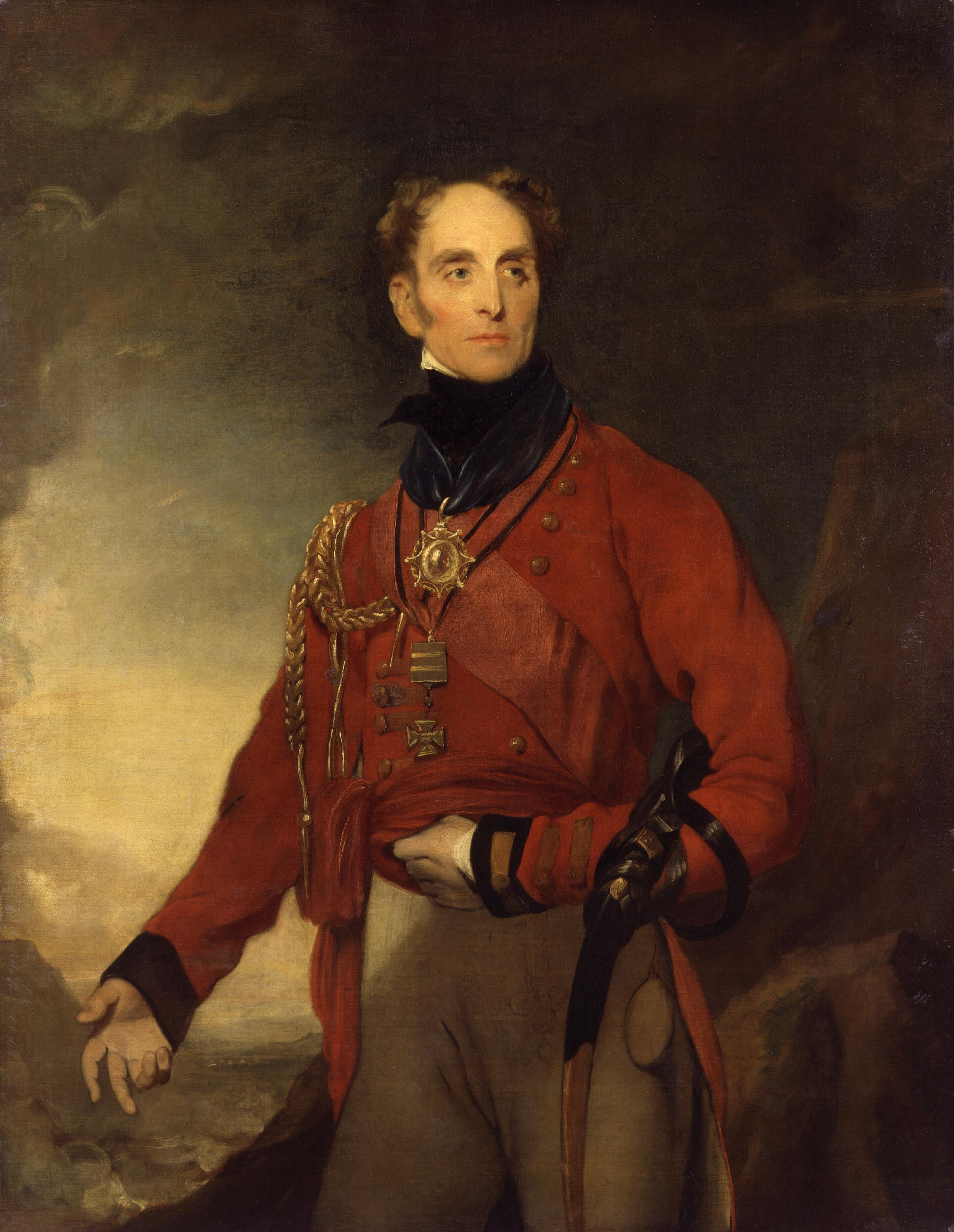
Portrait of Galbraith Lowry Cole by William Dyce

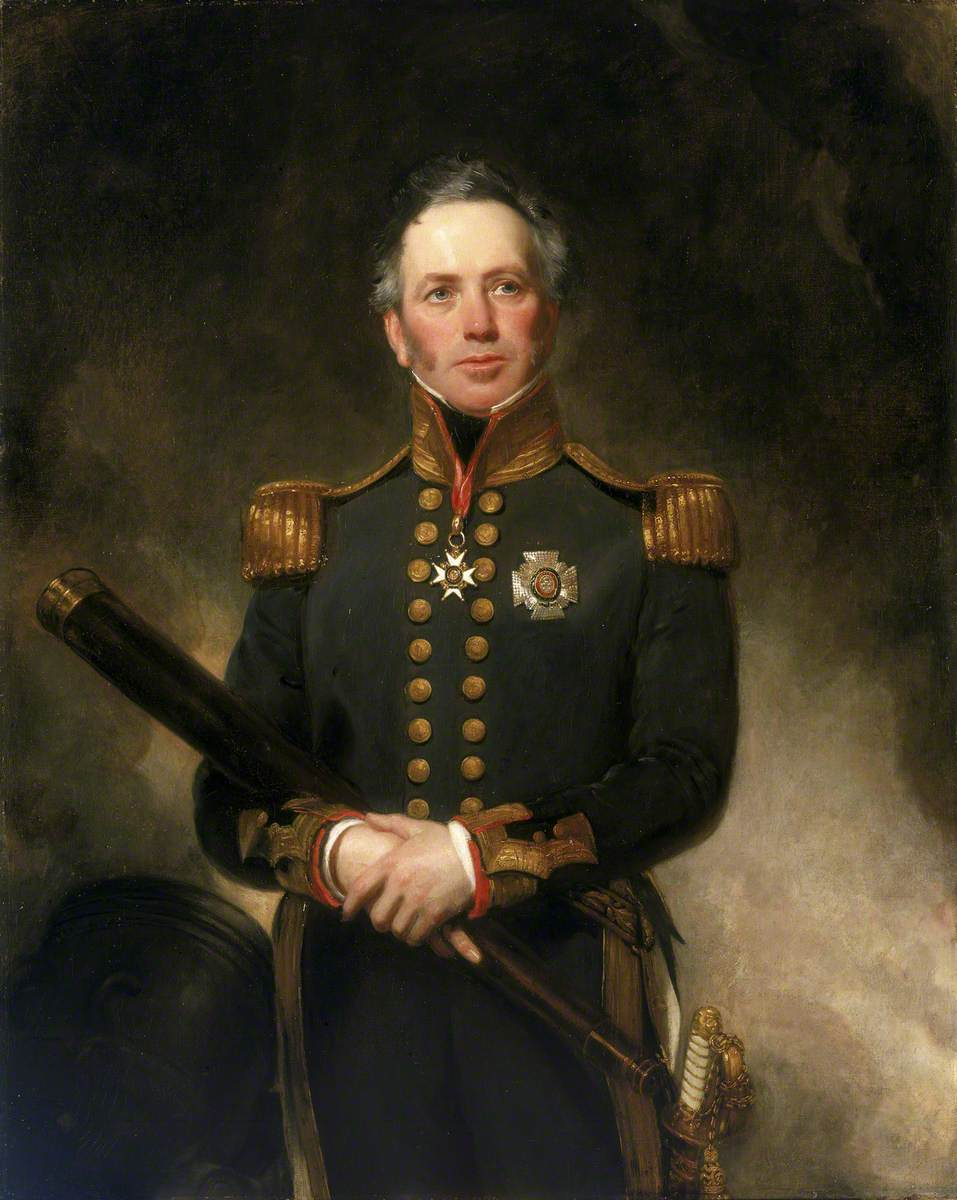
Portrait of Edward Brace by Henry William Pickersgill

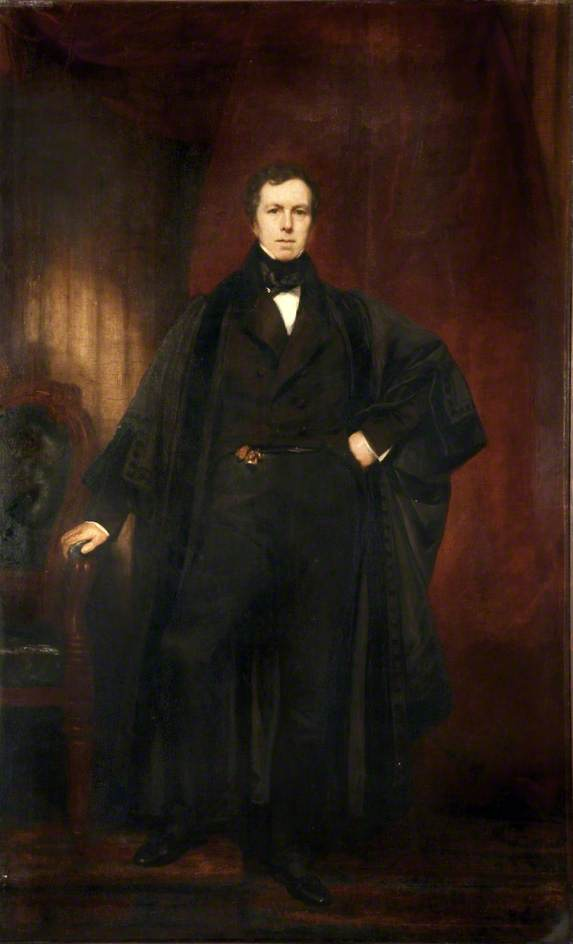
Portrait of William Wallace Currie by Thomas Phillips

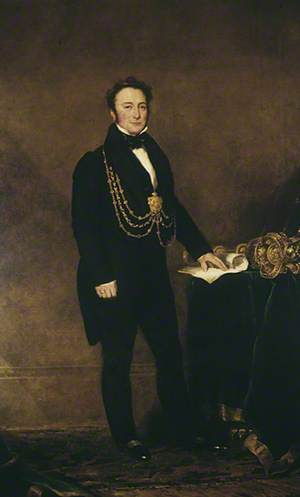
Portrait of George Goodman by John Simpson

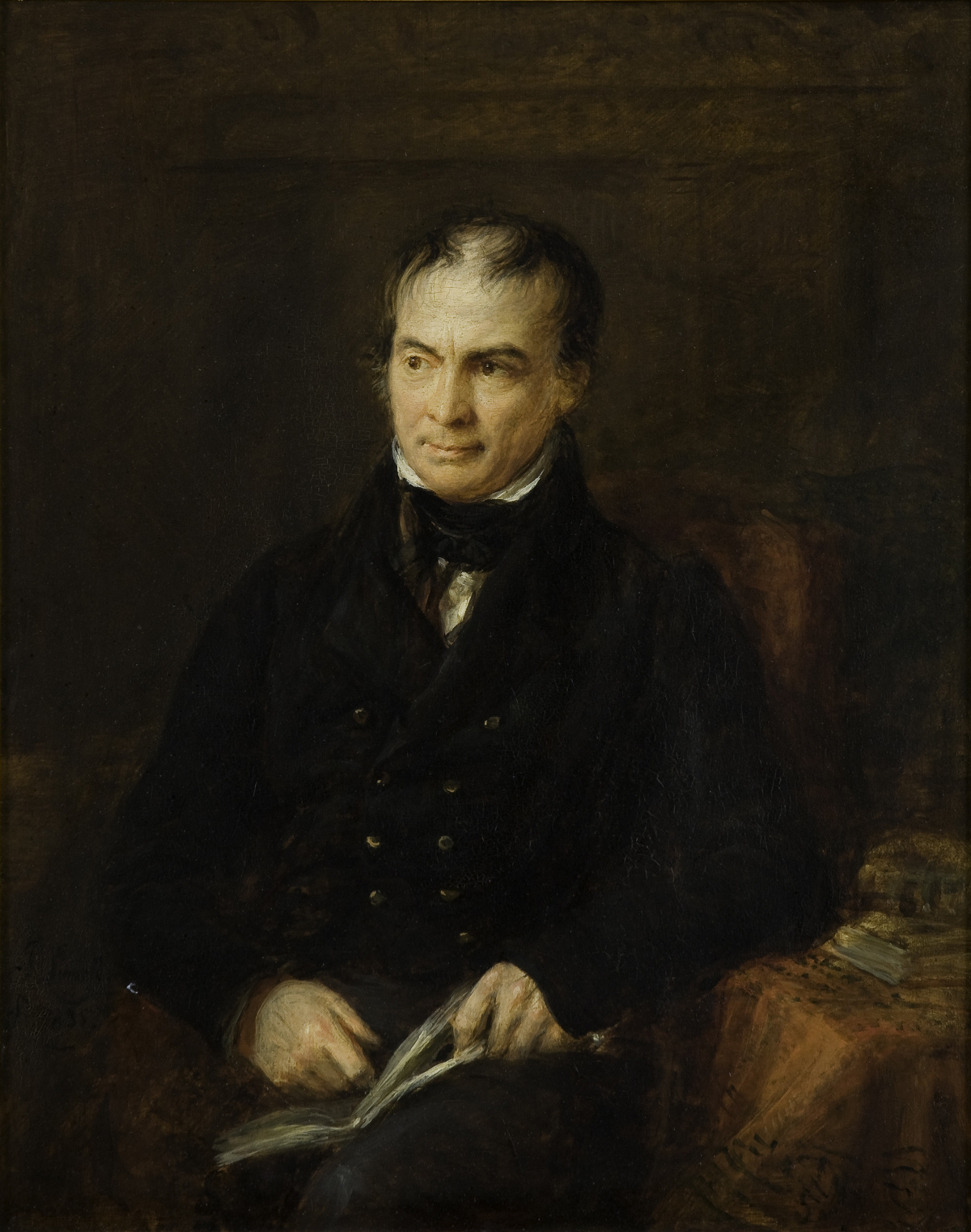
Portrait of Pelham Warren by John Linnell

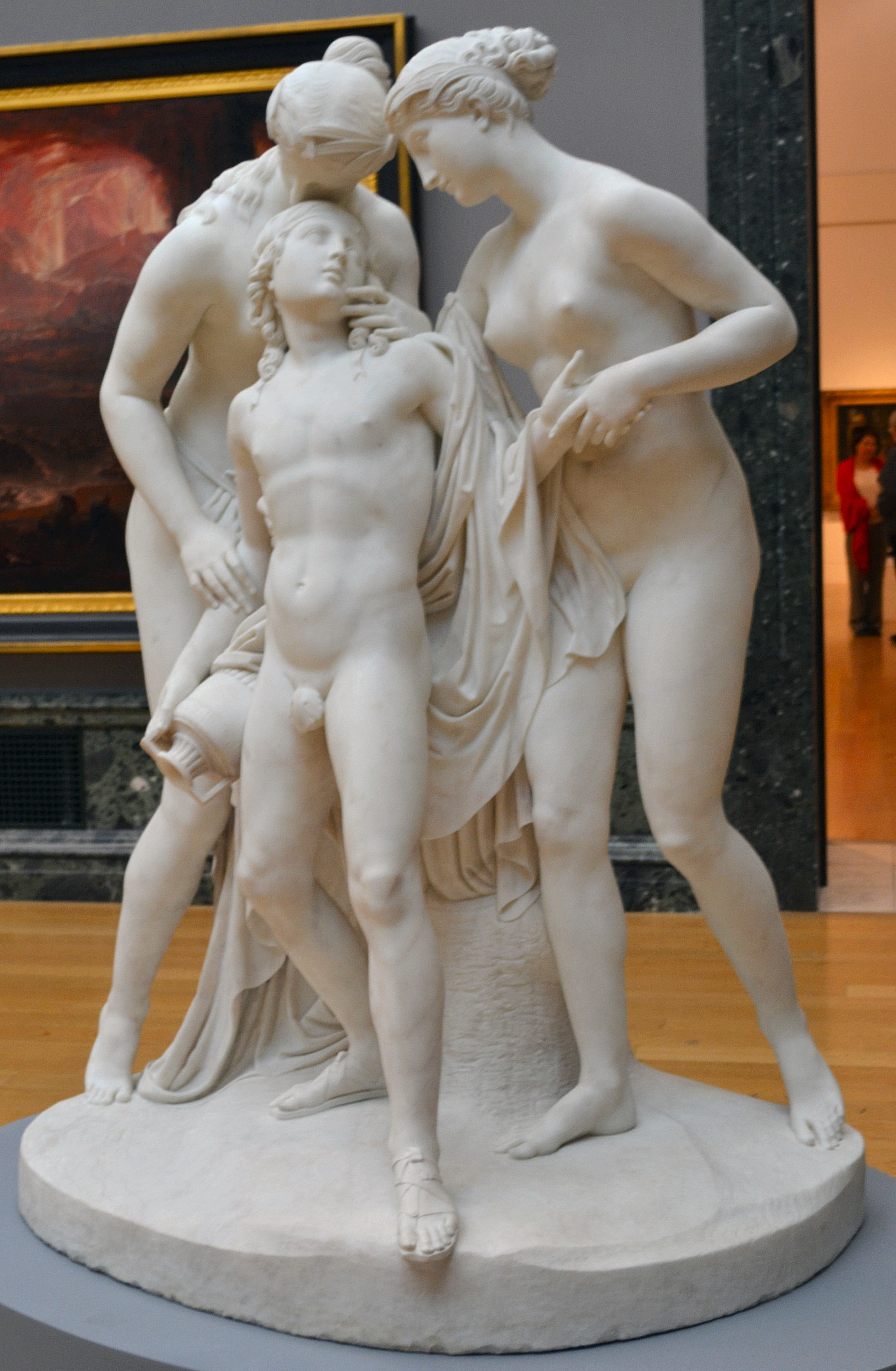
Hylas Surprised by the Naiades by John Gibson

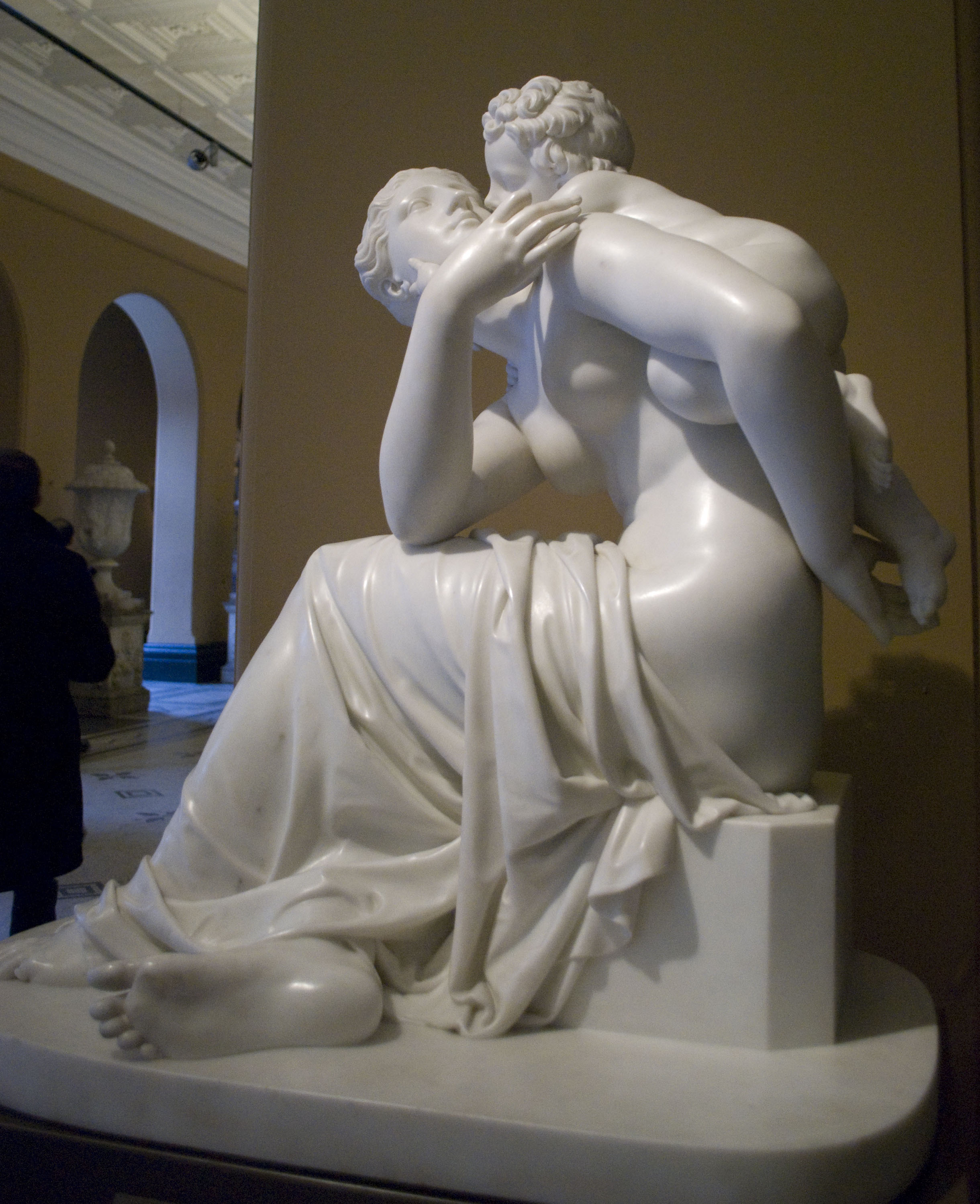
Maternal Affection by Edward Hodges Baily

== Bibliography ==
- Bailey, Anthony. John Constable: A Kingdom of his Own. Random House, 2012.
- Hamilton, James. Constable: A Portrait. Hachette UK, 2022.
- Hamilton, James. Turner - A Life. Sceptre, 1998.
- Hermann, Luke. Turner: Paintings, Watercolours, Prints & Drawings. University of California Press, 1975.
- Tromans, Nicholas. David Wilkie: The People's Painter. Edinburgh University Press, 2007.
