= The Wounded Heron =

Painting by George Frederic Watts

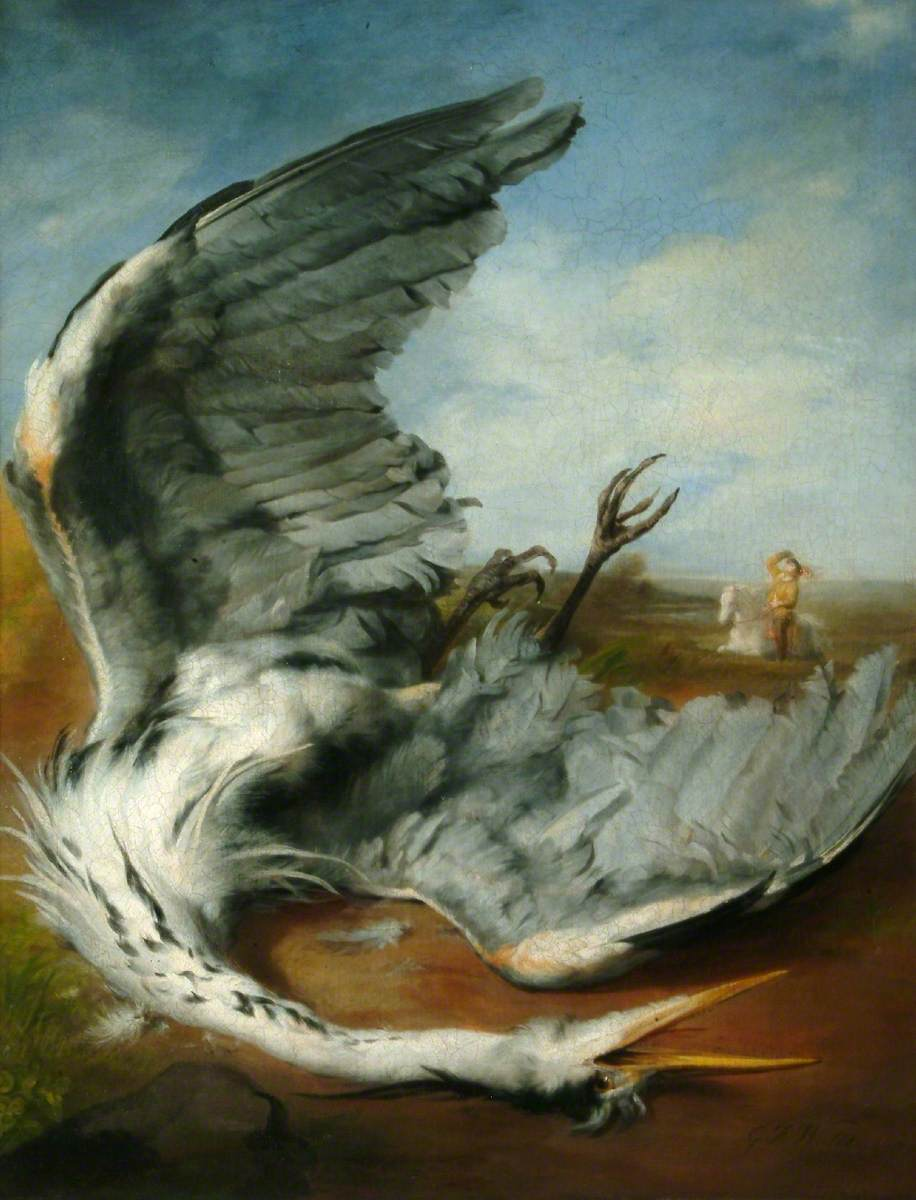
- Artist: George Frederic Watts
- Year: 1837
- Type: Oil on canvas, animal painting
- Dimensions: 91.4 cm × 71.1 cm (36.0 in × 28.0 in)
- Location: Watts Gallery, Surrey

The Wounded Heron is an 1837 oil painting by the British artist George Frederic Watts. It depicts a heron, wounded by a falcon as part of a hawking. Produced when the artist was around 20 years old, Watts bought a dead heron from a poulterer in order to produce a scene of poignant sadness. He made his public debut when he submitted it to the Royal Academy Exhibition of 1837 held at the National Gallery in London. The painting's theme and composition have been compared to Edwin Landseer's 1832 work Hawking in the Olden Time. However it is more stylised and lacks the ambiguity of Landseer's earlier picture.

Watts went on to be a prominent figure of British art during the Victorian era, associated with Symbolist Movement. The picture now forms part of the collection of the Watts Gallery in Surrey, having been bequeathed by the artist in 1905.

== Bibliography ==
- Bryant, Julius. Kenwood, Paintings in the Iveagh Bequest. Yale University Press, 2003.
