= Portrait of Queen Adelaide =

Painting by Martin Archer Shee

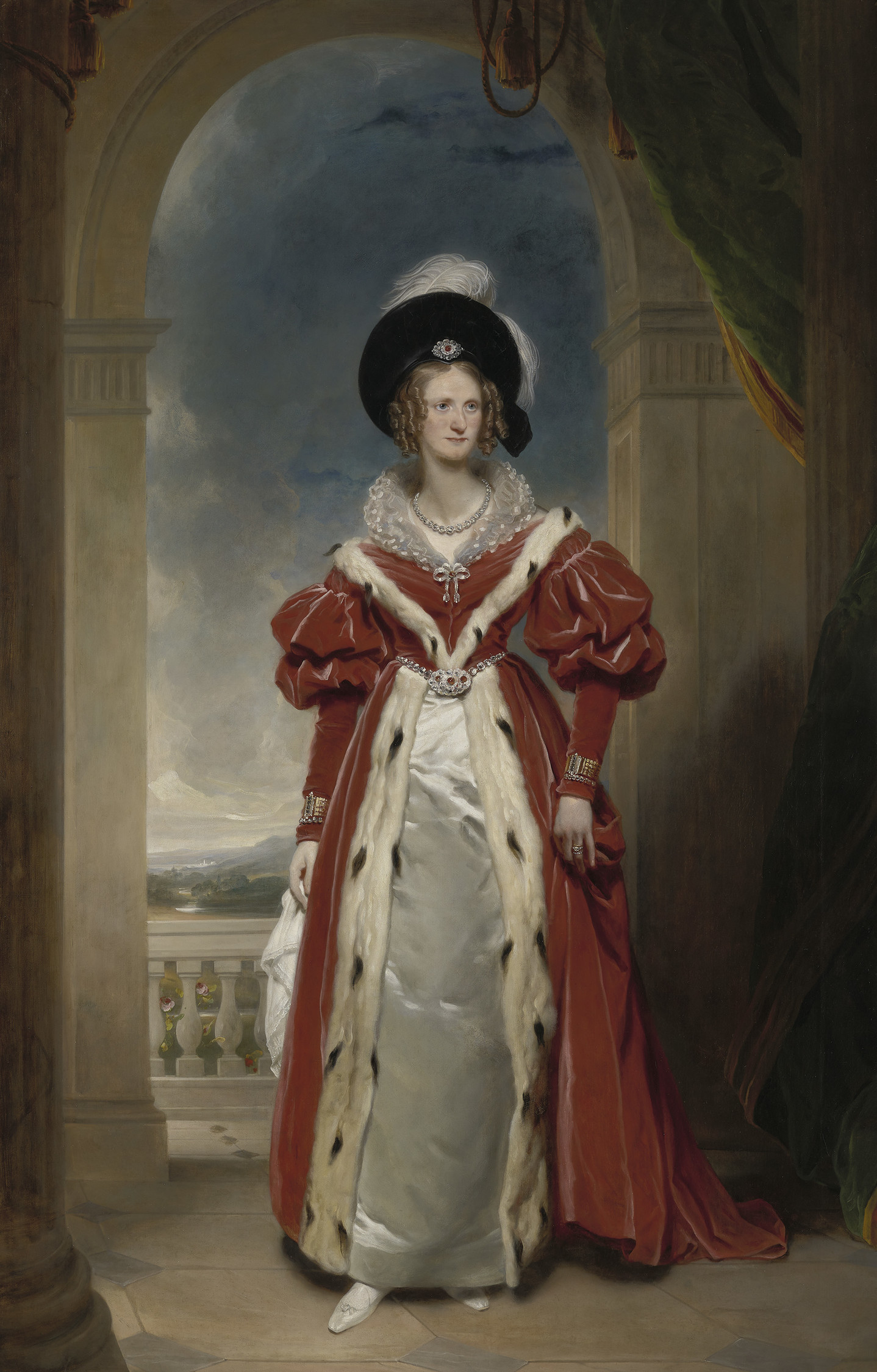
- Artist: Martin Archer Shee
- Year: 1836
- Type: Oil on canvas, portrait
- Dimensions: 252.1 cm × 161.9 cm (99.3 in × 63.7 in)
- Location: Buckingham Palace, London

Portrait of Queen Adelaide is an oil on canvas portrait painting by the Irish artist Martin Archer Shee, from 1836. It depicts Adelaide of Saxe-Meiningen, the wife of William IV and Queen Consort of the United Kingdom.

== History and description ==
Queen Adelaide is depicted at full-length wearing a red velvet pelisse trimmed with ermine. The queen looks static and expressionless. A landscape is visible in the background, through the arch.

Archer Shee was a prominent portraitist of the Regency era and in 1830 had succeeded Thomas Lawrence as the President of the Royal Academy. He was summoned to Windsor Castle to produce the work which had been commissioned by the Goldsmith's Company of the City of London. However the king was so impressed by the completed painting that he kept it for himself and ordered a second copy to be produced for the Goldsmiths, with Archer Shee being paid £766 for the two versions. The painting was exhibited at the Royal Academy's Summer Exhibition of 1837 at the National Gallery in Trafalgar Square. Today the work remains in the Royal Collection, at Buckingham Palace, where it hangs on the Grand Staircase alongside an 1827 portrait of her husband by Lawrence.

== See also ==
- Portrait of William IV (Archer Shee), an 1833 portrait of her husband by the same artist

== Bibliography ==
- Herrmann, Luke. Nineteenth Century British Painting. Charles de la Mare, 2000.
- Staniland, Kay. In Royal Fashion: The Clothes of Princess Charlotte of Wales & Queen Victoria, 1796-1901. Museum of London, 1997.
- Van Der Kiste, John. William IV: The Last Hanoverian King of Britain. Pen and Sword History, 2022.
