= Autolycus (painting) =

Painting by Charles Robert Leslie

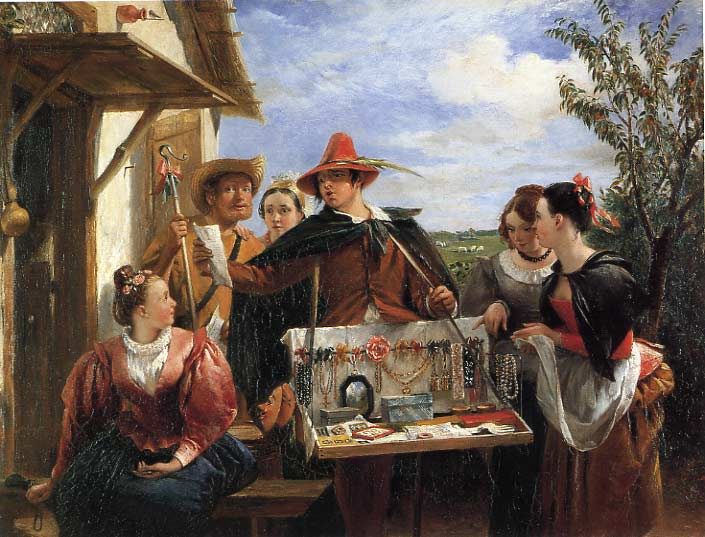
- Artist: Charles Robert Leslie
- Year: 1836
- Type: Oil on canvas, genre painting
- Dimensions: 53.3 cm × 73.6 cm (21.0 in × 29.0 in)
- Location: Victoria and Albert Museum, London

Autolycus is an oil painting by the Anglo-American artist Charles Robert Leslie, from 1836. It is held at the Victoria and Albert Museum, in London.

== History and description ==
It depicts the character of Autolycus the peddler from William Shakespeare's 1623 play A Winter's Tale. A self-described "snapper up of unconsidered trifles", Autolycus is shown hawking his wares including cheap goods and printed ballads to the country folk. Autolycus is surrounded by several people, four women and one man, who seem interested by his sales. Leslie based the sky and tree on sketches supplied by his friend, the celebrated landscape painter John Constable.

Illustrations of famous literary scenes and characters were popular during the era and Leslie produced a number.

== Provenance ==
The painting was displayed at the Royal Academy Exhibition of 1836 at Somerset House. Today it is in the Victoria and Albert Museum in South Kensington, having been gifted by the art collector John Sheepshanks in 1857. Sheepshanks also donated another Leslie work Florizel and Perdita based on the same play.

== Bibliography ==
- Lambourne, Lionel. An Introduction to "Victorian" Genre Painting: From Wilkie to Frith. Victoria and Albert Museum, 1982.
- Roe, Sonia. Oil Paintings in Public Ownership in the Victoria and Albert Museum. Public Catalogue Foundation, 2008.
