= The Canal of the Guidecca, and the Church of the Gesuati, Venice =

Painting by Clarkson Stanfield

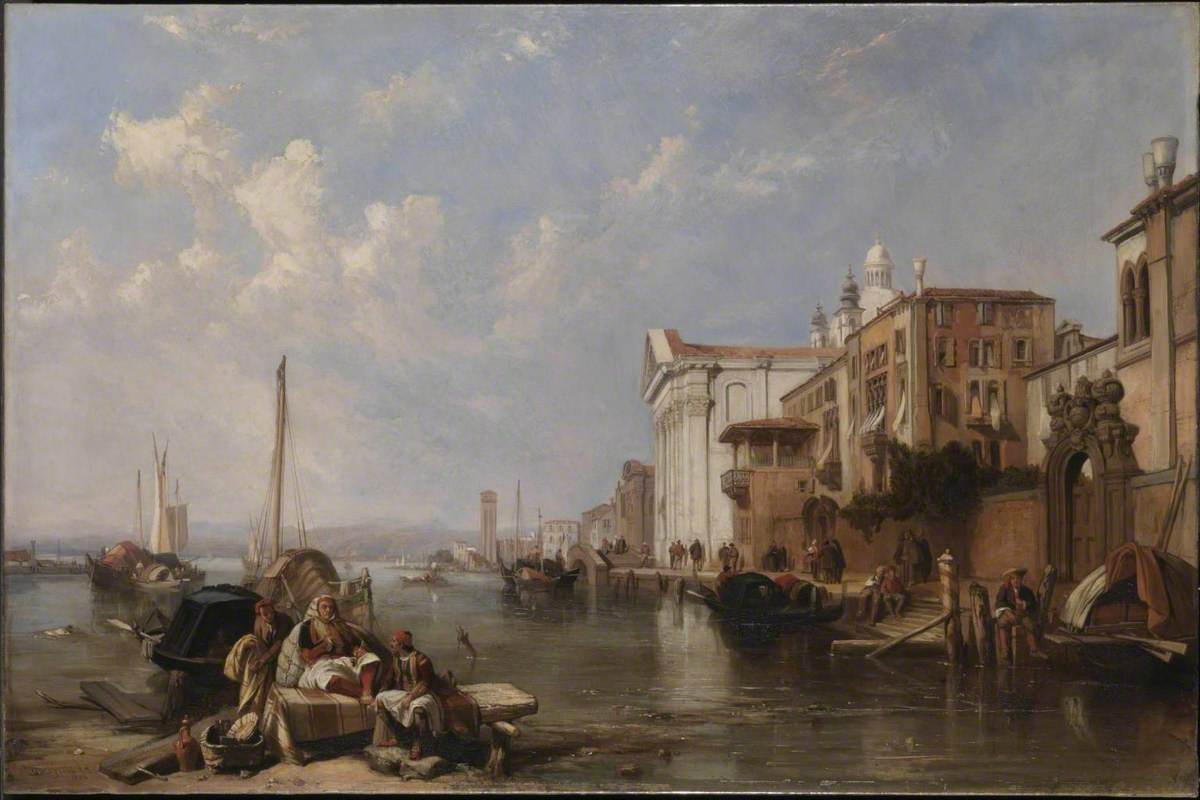
- Artist: Clarkson Stanfield
- Year: 1836
- Medium: Oil on canvas, landscape painting
- Dimensions: 90.2 cm × 61 cm (35.5 in × 24 in)
- Location: Tate Britain, London

The Canal of the Guidecca, and the Church of the Gesuati, Venice is an 1836 landscape painting by the British artist Clarkson Stanfield. It depicts a view of Venice featuring the Giudecca Canal and the Gesuati church.

The painting was displayed at the Royal Academy Exhibition of 1837 at the National Gallery in London. It was donated to the nation by the art collector Robert Vernon in 1847 as part of the Vernon Gift and is now in the collection of the Tate Britain.

== Bibliography ==
- Halsby, Julian. Venice: The Artist's Vision : a Guide to British and American Painters. Unicorn, 1999.
- Van der Merwe, Pieter & Took, Roger. The Spectacular career of Clarkson Stanfield. Tyne and Wear County Council Museums, 1979.
