= Mars, Venus and Cupid =

Painting by William Etty

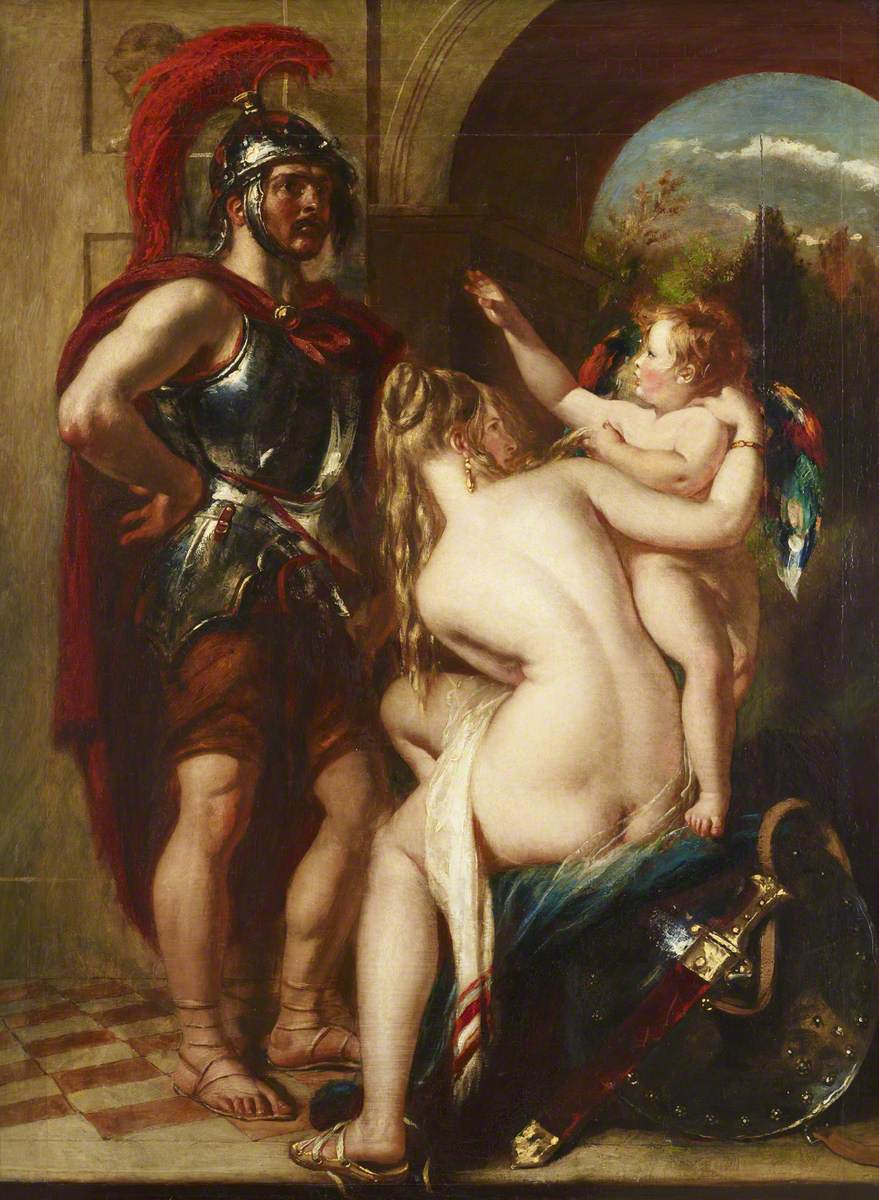
- Artist: William Etty
- Year: 1837
- Type: Oil on panel, history painting
- Dimensions: 90 cm × 66 cm (35 in × 26 in)
- Location: Anglesey Abbey, Cambridgeshire

'Mars, Venus and Cupid is an 1837 history painting by the British artist William Etty. Inspired by Ancient Roman mythology, it depicts Venus the goddess of love with Mars the god of war and their son Cupid. Etty was known for his nude paintings, that drew inspiration from the Old Masters and often reference classical themes. Here, Venus is shown naked from behind as she cradles Cupid while Mars is dressed in armour as if about to depart for war.

The painting was displayed at the Royal Academy Exhibition of 1837 at the National Gallery in London. Today it is in the collection of Anglesey Abbey in Cambridgeshire under the control of the National Trust.

== Bibliography ==
- Robinson, Leonard. William Etty: The Life and Art. McFarland, 2007.
- Smith, Alison. The Victorian Nude: Sexuality, Morality and Art. Manchester University Press, 1996.
