= The Old Shepherd's Chief Mourner =

Painting by Edwin Landseer

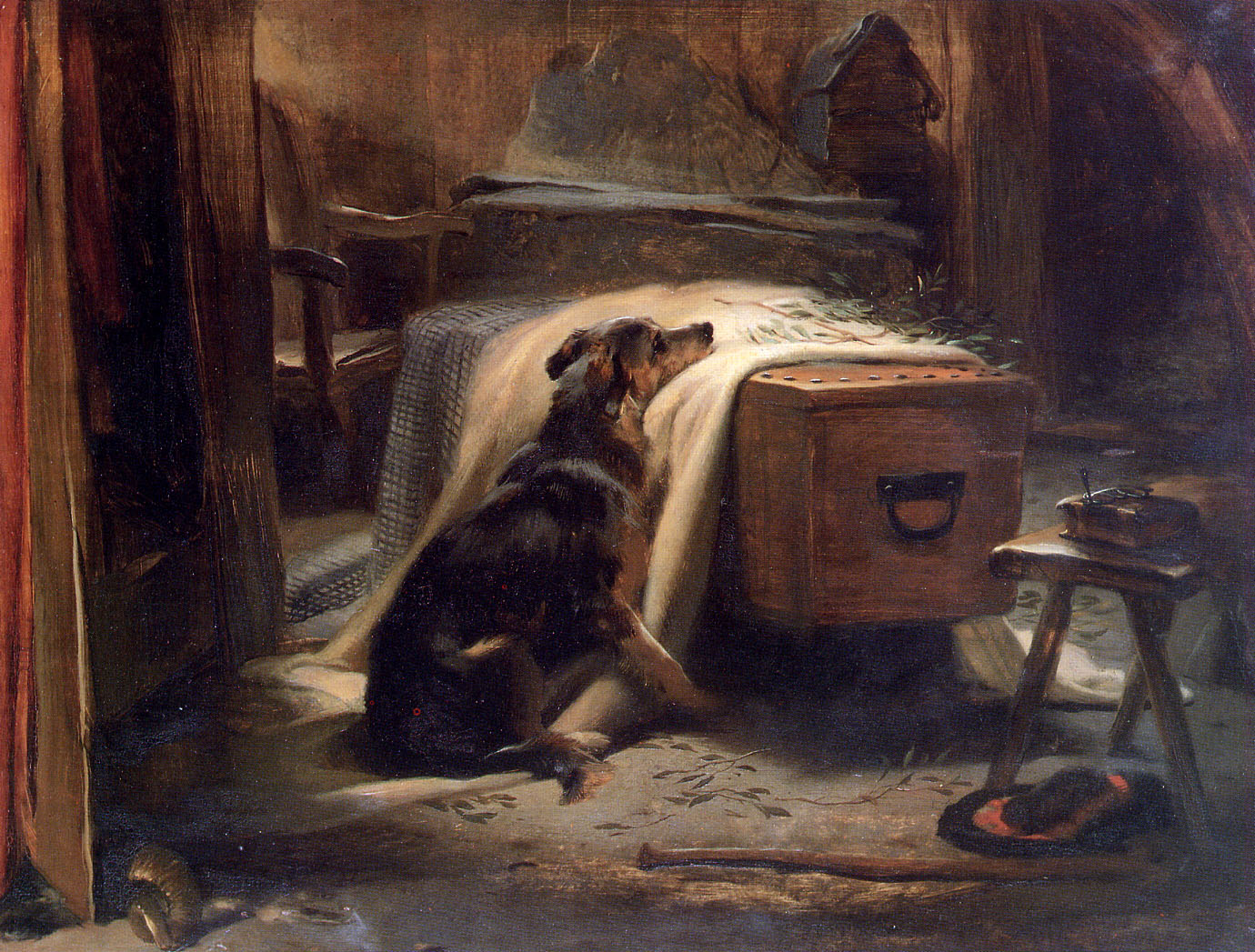
- Artist: Edwin Landseer
- Year: 1837
- Type: Oil on canvas, genre painting
- Dimensions: 45.7 cm × 60.9 cm (18.0 in × 24.0 in)
- Location: Victoria and Albert Museum, London

The Old Shepherd's Chief Mourner is an 1837 genre painting by the British artist Edwin Landseer. It depicts a faithful collie resting its head on the draped coffin of its shepherd. The painting implies that human mourners have departed, leaving the dog to whom his death means the most in a silent vigil. The setting is in the Scottish Highlands. It remains one of Landseer's best-known works. The painting was displayed at the Royal Academy Exhibition of 1837 at the National Gallery in London. It was well-received by critics, but overshadowed by the painter's Return from Hawking. It was only with the publication of Modern Painters by John Ruskin, who lavished praise on, that is acquired legendary status. Today it is in the possession of the Victoria and Albert Museum, having been donated by the art collector Joseph Sheepshanks in 1857 as part of the Sheepshanks Gift.

== Bibliography ==
- O'Gorman, Francis. The Cambridge Companion to Victorian Culture. Cambridge University Press, 2010.
- Ormond, Richard. Sir Edwin Landseer. Philadelphia Museum of Art, 1981.
