= Arundel Mill and Castle =

Painting by John Constable

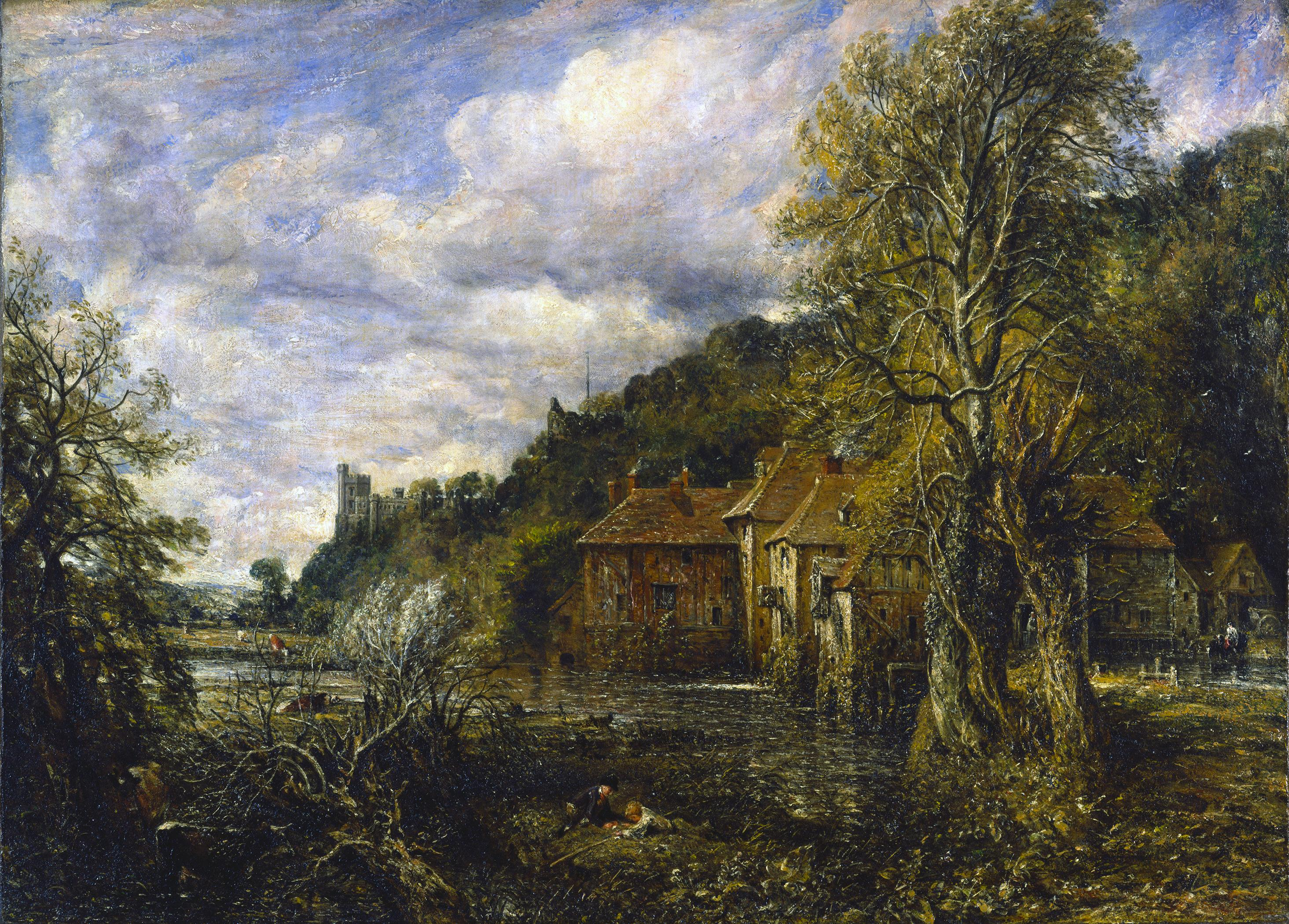
- Artist: John Constable
- Year: 1837
- Type: Oil on canvas, Landscape painting
- Dimensions: 72 cm × 100 cm (28.5 in × 39.5 in)
- Location: Toledo Museum of Art, Toledo

Arundel Mill and Castle is an 1837 landscape painting by the English artist John Constable. Produced the year of his death, it depicts a scene on the River Arun in Sussex. In the foreground is a mill, while Arundel Castle is shown in the distance. Today it is in the Toledo Museum of Art in Toledo, Ohio, described as Constable's last painting. Constable had viewed the scene while visiting George Constable, a friend and brewer. He was working on the painting in 1836, but shelved it to complete Cenotaph to the Memory of Sir Joshua Reynolds in time for that year's Summer Exhibition at the Royal Academy. He resumed work on it the following year but died before its completion. His friend Charles Robert Leslie felt it was far enough advanced to exhibit posthumously at that year's Royal Academy Exhibition. Leslie believed that the scene had reminded Constable of the Stour Valley in his native Suffolk.

== See also ==
- List of paintings by John Constable

== Bibliography ==
- Charles, Victoria. Constable. Parkstone International, 2015.
- Hamilton, James. Constable: A Portrait. Hachette UK, 2022.
- Venning, Barry. Constable. Parkstone International, 2015.
