= London from Fleet Street =

Painting by David Roberts

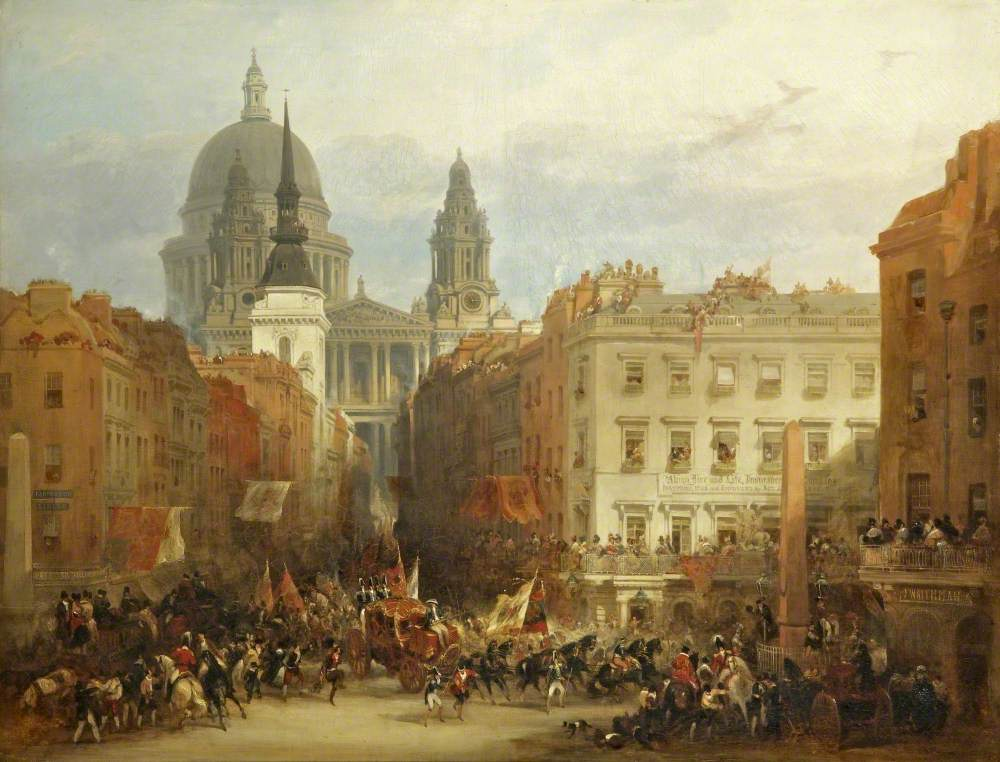
- Artist: David Roberts
- Year: 1837
- Type: Oil on canvas, landscape painting
- Dimensions: 70.4 cm × 90.4 cm (27.7 in × 35.6 in)
- Location: Walker Art Gallery; Liverpool

London from Fleet Street is an 1837 oil painting by the British artist David Roberts. It is a cityscape featuring the City of London, with a Romantic view of St Paul's Cathedral as seen looking northwards from Fleet Street not far from the River Thames. It features the Lord Mayor's Show and is sometimes known by the alternative title London from Fleet Street, the Lord Mayor's Show.

It has similarities with St Paul's Cathedral with the Lord Mayor's Procession which Roberts produced the year before, but shows a strikingly different viewpoint. Unlike the previous painting, now in the Guildhall Art Gallery it was not exhibited publicly at either the British Institution or Royal Academy and was likely commissioned by a private collector. In 1875 it was purchased by the Walker Art Gallery in Liverpool. The painting was the inspiration for an 1844 engraving by Edward Goodall, a copy of which is now in the Royal Collection.

== Bibliography ==
- Sim, Katherine. David Roberts R.A., 1796–1864: A Biography. Quartet Books, 1984.
- Wright, Christopher, Gordon, Catherine May & Smith, Mary Peskett. British and Irish Paintings in Public Collections: An Index of British and Irish Oil Paintings by Artists Born Before 1870 in Public and Institutional Collections in the United Kingdom and Ireland. Yale University Press, 2006.
