= Florizel and Perdita =

Painting by Charles Robert Leslie

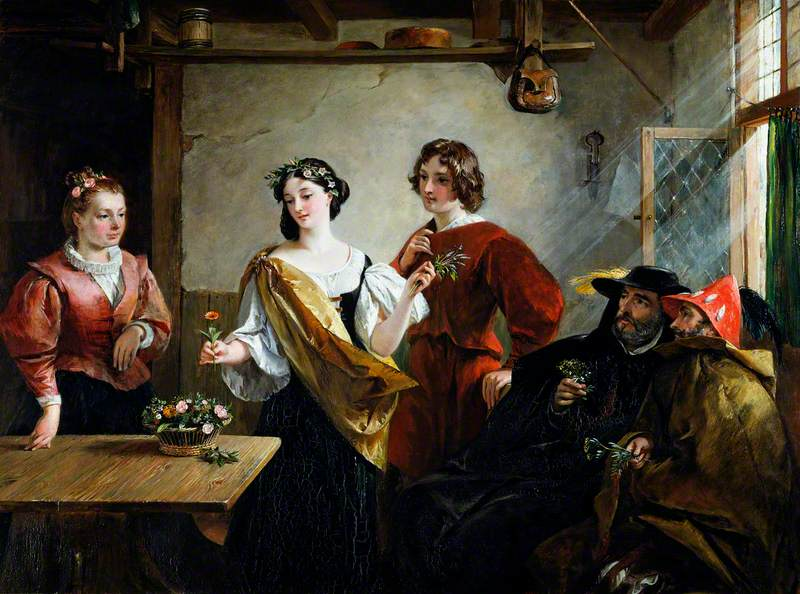
- Artist: Charles Robert Leslie
- Year: 1837
- Type: Oil on canvas, genre painting
- Dimensions: 53.3 cm × 73.6 cm (21.0 in × 29.0 in)
- Location: Victoria and Albert Museum, London

Florizel and Perdita is an 1837 genre painting by the Anglo-American artist Charles Robert Leslie. It features a scene from William Shakespeare's Jacobean play The Winter's Tale. Drawn from Act IV, Scene 4 of the play, it depicts the princess Perdita in disguise with flowers alongside her secret lover Prince Florizel who is disguised as a shepherd. Seated on the right are his father King Polixenes and a Sicilian nobleman Camillo. On the left stands Dorcas, a real shepherdess .

Such depictions of popular literature were fashionable in the late Regency and early Victorian era. Leslie himself, born on London to American parents, produced a number of works based on Shakespeare and other celebrated authors. The painting was displayed at the Royal Academy Exhibition of 1837 at the National Gallery in London. Acquired by the art collector John Sheepshanks, he donated it to the newly-established Victoria and Albert Museum in 1857 as part of the Sheepshanks Gift.

== See also ==
- Autolycus, an 1836 painting by Leslie based on the same play

== Bibliography ==
- Lambourne, Lionel. An Introduction to "Victorian" Genre Painting: From Wilkie to Frith. Victoria and Albert Museum, 1982.
- Roe, Sonia. Oil Paintings in Public Ownership in the Victoria and Albert Museum. Public Catalogue Foundation, 2008.
- Sillars, Stuart. Shakespeare and the Victorians. Oxford University Press, 2013
