= Josephine and the Fortune-Teller =

Painting by David Wilkie

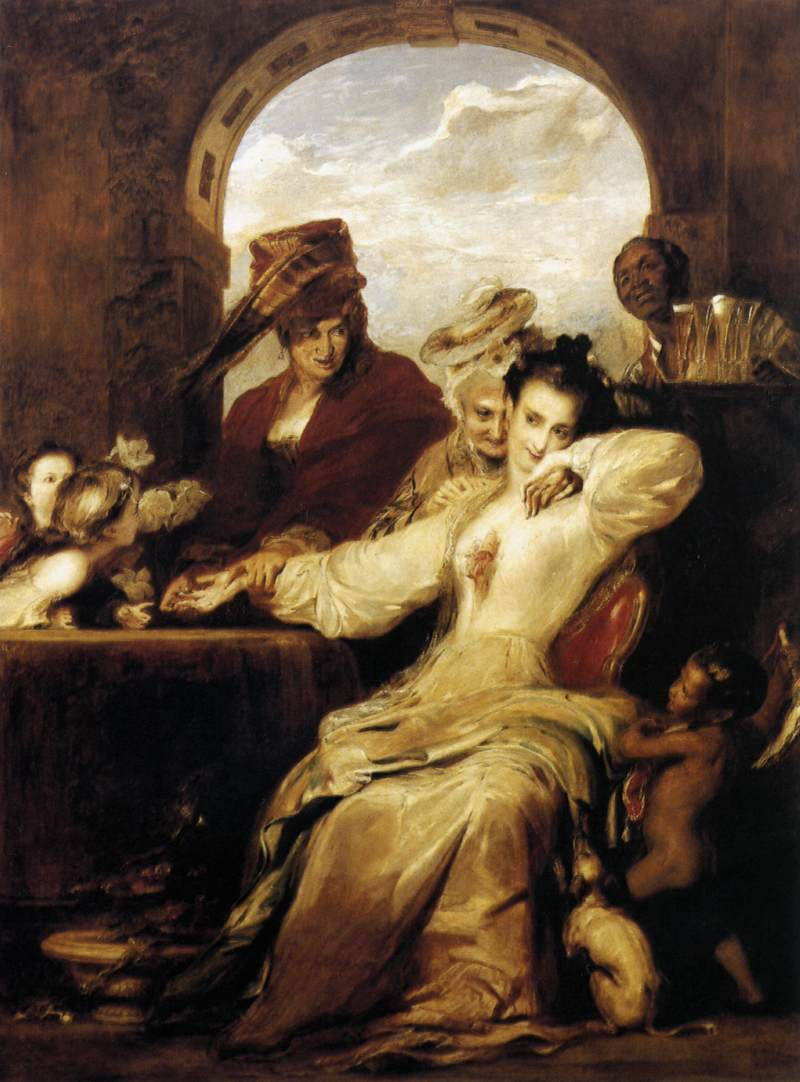
- Artist: David Wilkie
- Year: 1837
- Type: Oil on canvas, history painting
- Dimensions: 211 cm × 158 cm (83 in × 62 in)
- Location: Scottish National Gallery, Edinburgh

Josephine and the Fortune-Teller is an oil on canvas history painting by the British artist David Wilkie, from 1837.

== History and description ==
It depicts a story about the young Joséphine de Beauharnais visiting a fortune teller on her native island of Martinique, who predicts her future in France as the wife of Emperor Napoleon.

The painting was produced at the suggestion of William Knighton and was commissioned by the politician John Abel Smith. The previous year Wilkie had produced a painting featuring Josephine's husband, Napoleon and Pius VII at Fontainebleau.

It was exhibited at the Royal Academy's Summer Exhibition in London. Today the painting is in the collection of the Scottish National Gallery, in Edinburgh, having been purchased in 1949.

== Bibliography ==
- Johnson, Edward Dudley Hume. Paintings of the British Social Scene: From Hogarth to Sickert. Weidenfeld and Nicolson, 1986.
- Noon, Patrick & Bann, Stephen. Constable to Delacroix: British Art and the French Romantics. Tate, 2003.
- Tromans, Nicholas. David Wilkie: The People's Painter. Edinburgh University Press, 2007.
