= 1775 in art =

Events from the year 1775 in art.

== Events ==
- 25 August – The Salon of 1775 opens at the Louvre in Paris
- Nathaniel Hone the Elder courts controversy when his satirical painting The Conjuror is seen to ridicule Sir Joshua Reynolds and attack the English fashion for copying Italian Renaissance painting, and is rejected by the Royal Academy of Arts (ostensibly on the grounds that also includes a nude caricature of fellow Academician Angelica Kauffman, which Hone subsequently paints out). To show his reputation is undamaged, Hone organises a one-man retrospective in St Martin's Lane, London – the first such solo exhibition of an artist's work.
- Josiah Wedgwood introduces jasperware pottery in England, commissioning designs from John Flaxman.
- Construction of the Cluj-Napoca Bánffy Palace, the modern-day National Museum of Art Cluj-Napoca in Transylvania.

== Paintings ==
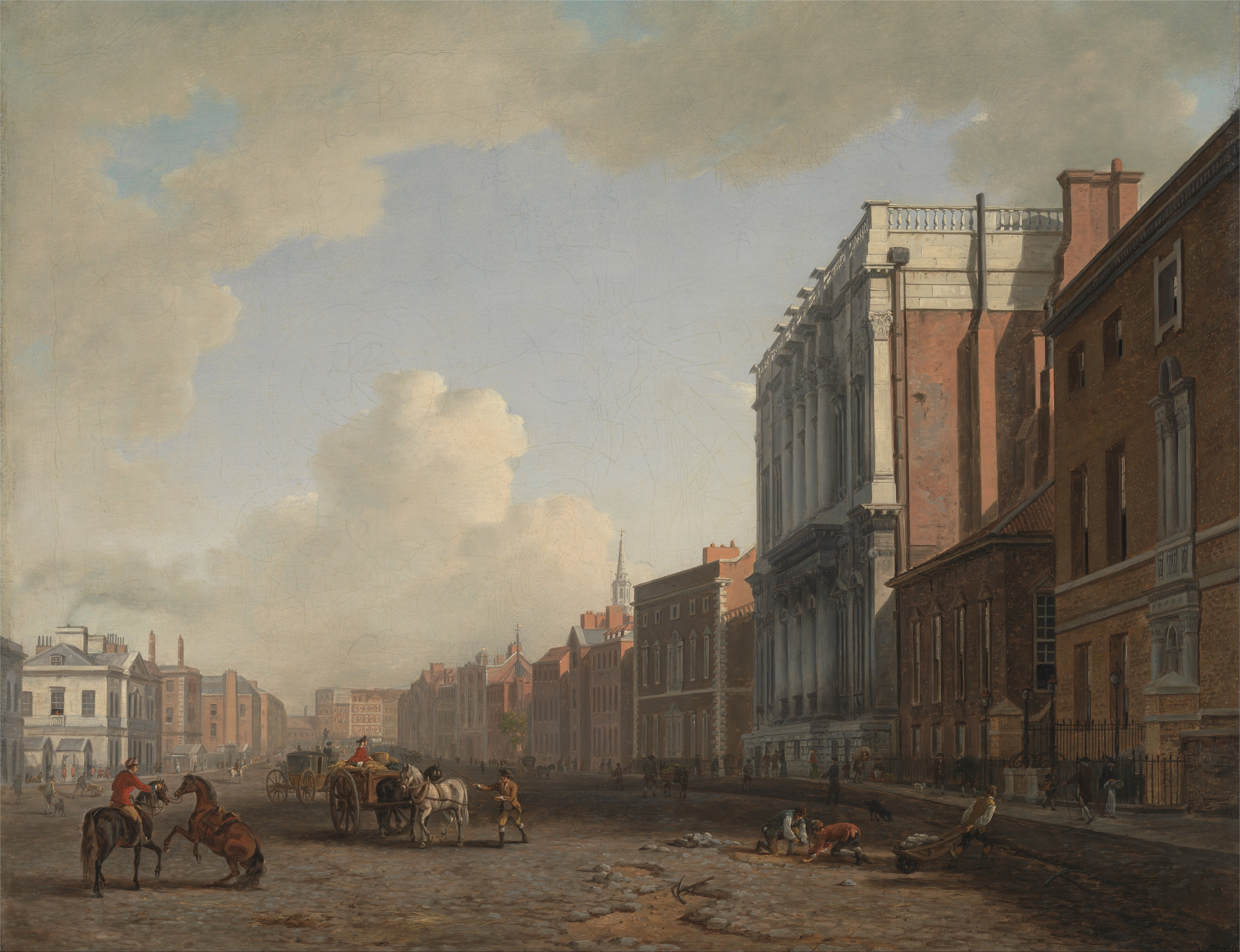
Whitehall by William Marlow

- David Allan – Portrait of Sir William Hamilton
- Étienne Aubry
  - Paternal Love
  - Portrait of Noël Hallé
- Nathaniel Dance-Holland – Portrait of James Cook
- François-Hubert Drouais – Portrait of Maria Theresa of Savoy
- Joseph Duplessis – Portrait of Christoph Willibald von Gluck
- Jean-Baptiste André Gautier-Dagoty – Portrait of Marie Antoinette
- Marie-Suzanne Giroust – Self-portrait with an image of Maurice Quentin de La Tour (approximate date)
- Anton Graff – Sophie Friederike Hensel
- Nathaniel Hone the Elder – The Conjuror
- Nicolas Bernard Lépicié – The Interior of a Customs House
- William Marlow – Whitehall
- Joshua Reynolds
  - The Earl and Countess of Ely (Upton House, Warwickshire - approximate date)
  - Mrs Sheridan as Saint Cecilia (Waddesdon Manor, Buckinghamshire)
- Alexander Roslin – Portrait of Carl von Linné
- Joseph-Marie Vien – Venus, Wounded by Diomedes, Is Saved by Iris
- Benjamin West – Daniel Interpreting to Belshazzar the Writing on the Wall

== Births ==
- February 3 – Louis-François, Baron Lejeune, French general, painter and lithographer (died 1848)
- February 18 – Thomas Girtin, English painter and etcher (died 1802)
- March 4 – Johann Baptist von Lampi the Younger, Austrian portrait painter (died 1837)
- March 24 – Pauline Auzou, French painter (died 1835)
- April 21 – Alexander Anderson, illustrator (died 1870)
- April 23 – J. M. W. Turner, English Romantic landscape painter, watercolourist and printmaker (died 1851)
- July 1 – Cephas Thompson, portrait painter (died 1856)
- July 5 – William Crotch, musician and painter (died 1847)
- July 15 – Sir Richard Westmacott, sculptor (died 1856)
- September 16 – Ernst Willem Jan Bagelaar, Dutch engraver (died 1837)
- October 18 – John Vanderlyn, neoclassical painter (died 1852)
- October 31 – Antonín Machek, Czech painter (died 1844)
- December 29 – Thomas Heaphy, English water-colour and portrait painter (died 1835)
- date unknown
  - Nathan Cooper Branwhite, English miniature portrait painter, watercolourist and engraver (died 1857)
  - Amelia Curran, Irish painter (died 1847)
  - Francis Engleheart, English engraver (died 1849)

== Deaths ==
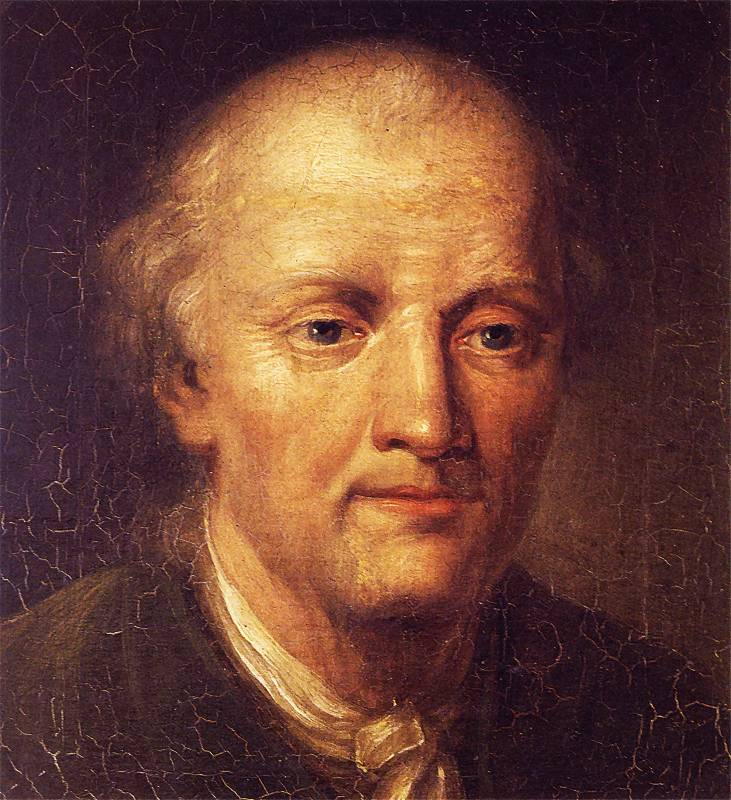
Szymon Czechowicz – Self-portrait, 1775

- January 8 – John Baskerville, typographer and craftsman (born 1707)
- March 17 – Carlo Carlone, Italian painter (born 1686)
- April 10 – Jonas Haas, German-born Danish engraver (born 1720)
- May 18 – Johann Joachim Kändler, German modeller of Meissen porcelain in a rococo style (born 1706)
- June 27 – Ignaz Günther, German sculptor and woodcarver within the Bavarian rococo tradition (born 1725)
- July 8 – Peder Als, Danish historical and portrait painter (born 1725)
- July 21 – Szymon Czechowicz, Polish painter (born 1689)
- August 29 – Francesco Sleter, Italian painter active in England (born 1685)
- September 24 – Emanuel Büchel, Swiss painter (born 1705)
- October 21 – François-Hubert Drouais, French painter (born 1727)
- October 26 – Pierre-Edmé Babel, French engraver (born 1720)
- November 10 – Edme Dumont, French sculptor (born 1720)
- December 8 – Josef Ignaz Mildorfer, Austrian painter (born 1719)
- December 20 – Sigismund Streit, German merchant and patron of the arts (born 1687)
- date unknown
  - Jan George Freezen, German portrait painter (born 1701)
  - Johan Graham, painter from London active in The Hague and Amsterdam (born 1705)
- probable – Mina Kolokolnikov, Russian painter and teacher (born 1708)
