= Yale Center for British Art =

Art museum in Connecticut, United States

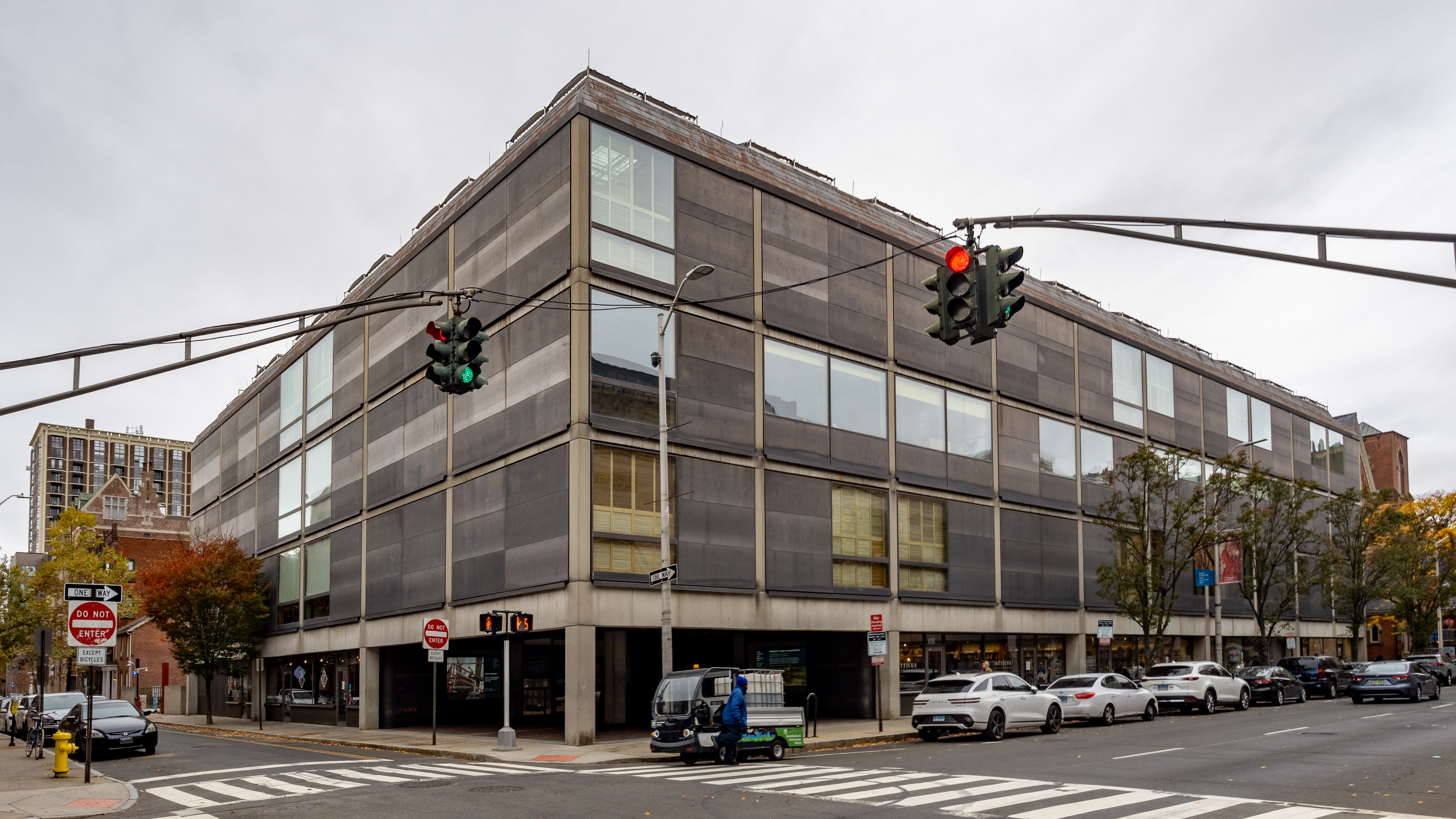
- The Yale Center for British Art at Yale University (2024)
- Interactive fullscreen map

General information
- Type: Art museum, Rare Book Library, Institute, Art center
- Architectural style: Modern
- Location: New Haven, Connecticut, 1080 Chapel Street
- Coordinates: 41°18′28″N 72°55′51″W
- Completed: 1974

Technical details
- Structural system: Concrete frame

Design and construction
- Architect: Louis Kahn

Other information
- Public transit: 237, 238, 241, 243, 246, 254, 255

Website
- britishart.yale.edu

The Yale Center for British Art at Yale University in central New Haven, Connecticut, United States, houses the largest and most comprehensive collection of British art outside the United Kingdom. The collection of paintings, sculpture, drawings, prints, rare books, and manuscripts reflects the development of British art and culture from the Elizabethan period onward. Its director is currently Martina Droth.

== Creation ==
The center was established by a gift from Paul Mellon (Yale College Class of 1929) of his British art collection to Yale in 1966, together with an endowment for operations of the center, and funds for a building to house the artworks. The building was designed by Louis I. Kahn and constructed at the corner of York and Chapel Streets in New Haven, across the street from one of Kahn's earliest buildings, the Yale University Art Gallery, built in 1953.

The Yale Center for British Art was completed after Kahn's death in 1974, and opened to the public on April 15, 1977. The exterior is made of matte steel and reflective glass; the interior is made of travertine marble, white oak, and Belgian linen. Kahn succeeded in creating intimate galleries where one can view objects in diffused natural light. He wanted to allow in as much daylight as possible, with artificial illumination used only on dark days or in the evening. The building's design, materials, and sky-lit rooms combine to provide an environment for the works of art that is simple and dignified.

The center is affiliated with the Paul Mellon Centre for Studies in British Art in London, which awards grants and fellowships, publishes academic titles, and sponsors Yale's first credit-granting undergraduate study abroad program, Yale-in-London.

== Collection ==
The collection consists of nearly 2,000 paintings and 200 sculptures, with an emphasis on the period between William Hogarth's birth (1697) to J. M. W. Turner's death (1851). Other artists represented include Thomas Gainsborough, George Stubbs, Joseph Wright, John Constable, Joshua Reynolds, Thomas Lawrence, Francis Danby, Robert Polhill Bevan, Stanley Spencer, Barbara Hepworth, and Ben Nicholson.

Interior of the fourth floor

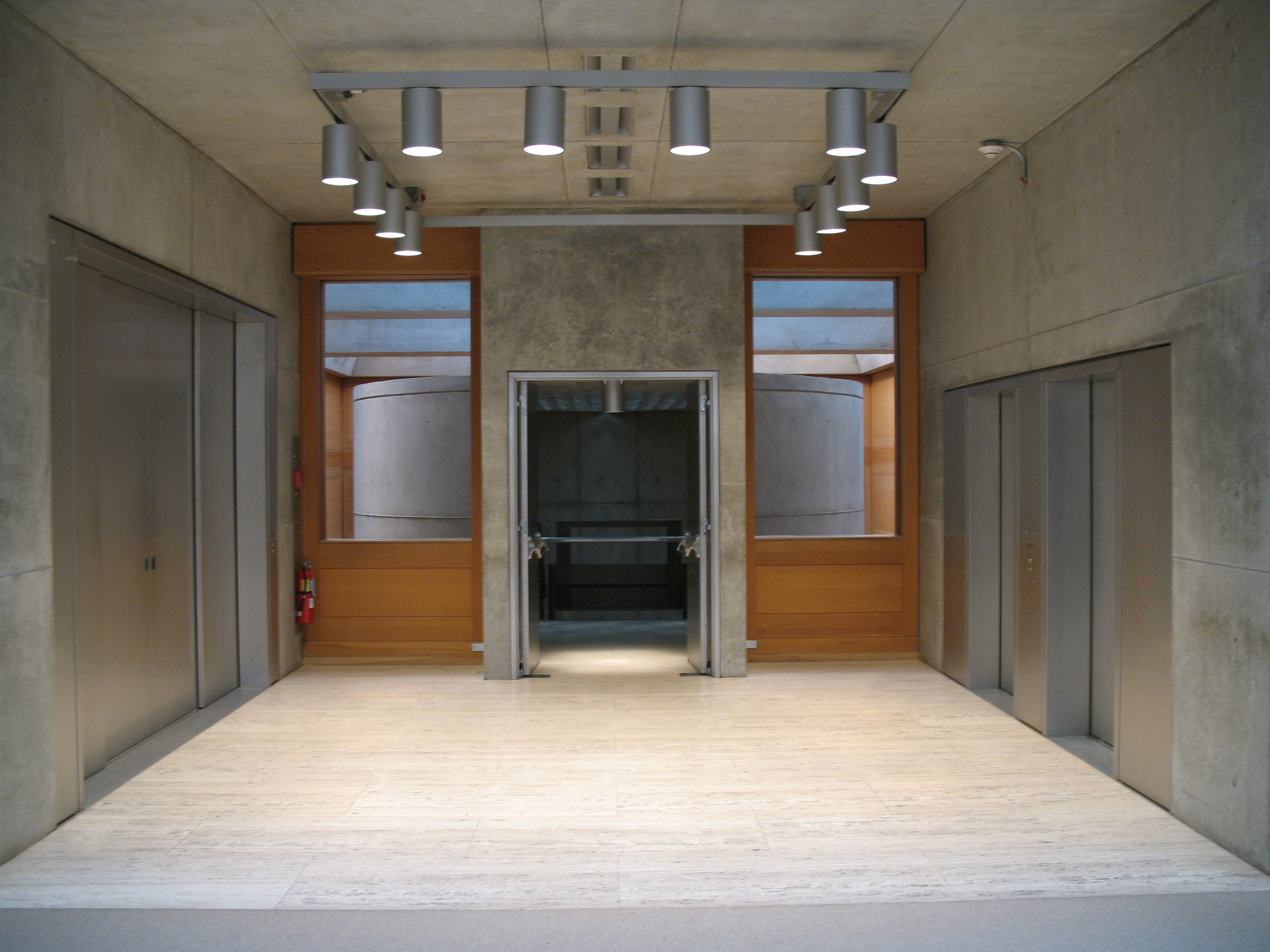
Fourth floor lobby

The collection also has works by artists from Europe and North America who lived and worked in Britain. These include Hans Holbein, Peter Paul Rubens, Anthony van Dyck, Canaletto, Johann Zoffany, John Singleton Copley, Benjamin West, and James McNeill Whistler.

Some areas of emphasis of the collection are small group portraits, known as "conversation pieces", including those by Hogarth, Gainsborough, Johan Zoffany and Arthur Devis; landscape paintings by Gainsborough, Richard Wilson, Constable, Richard Parkes Bonington and Turner; and British sporting and animal paintings, featuring George Stubbs, John Wootton, Benjamin Marshall, and Alfred Munnings. Other genres include marine paintings, represented by Samuel Scott and Charles Brooking; London cityscapes; travel art from India, scenes of Shakespearean plays, and portraits of actors.

Sculptors represented include Louis-Francois Roubiliac, Joseph Nollekens, Francis Chantrey, Jacob Epstein, and Henry Moore.

The collection of 20,000 drawings and watercolors and 31,000 prints features British sporting art and figure drawings. It includes works by Hogarth, Paul Sandby, Thomas Rowlandson, William Blake, John Constable, Samuel Palmer, Richard Parkes Bonington, John Ruskin, J. M. W. Turner, Walter Sickert, Duncan Grant, Paul Nash, Edward Burra, Stanley Spencer, Augustus John, Gwen John, and the Pre-Raphaelites.

The center's collection of rare books and manuscripts comprises 35,000 volumes, including maps, atlases, sporting books, and archival material of British artists. It also has some 1,300 leaves originating in illustrated incunabula. The collection also includes a complete set of William Morris's Kelmscott Press publications as well as a growing collection of contemporary artists' books. The core of the collection of illustrated books is the material amassed by Major J. R. Abbey‚ one of the first collectors of British color-plate books, and includes more than 2‚000 volumes describing British life‚ customs‚ scenery‚ and travel during the period 1770–1860. The center's collection also contains a significant number of early maps and atlases.

The four-floor center offers a year-round schedule of exhibitions and educational programs, including films, concerts, lectures, tours, symposia, and family programs. It also provides numerous opportunities for scholarly research, including residential fellowships. Academic resources of the center include the reference library (40,000 volumes) and photo archive, conservation laboratories, and a study room for examining works on paper from the collection.

The center is open to the public free of charge six days a week, and is a member of the North American Reciprocal Museums program.

== Gallery ==
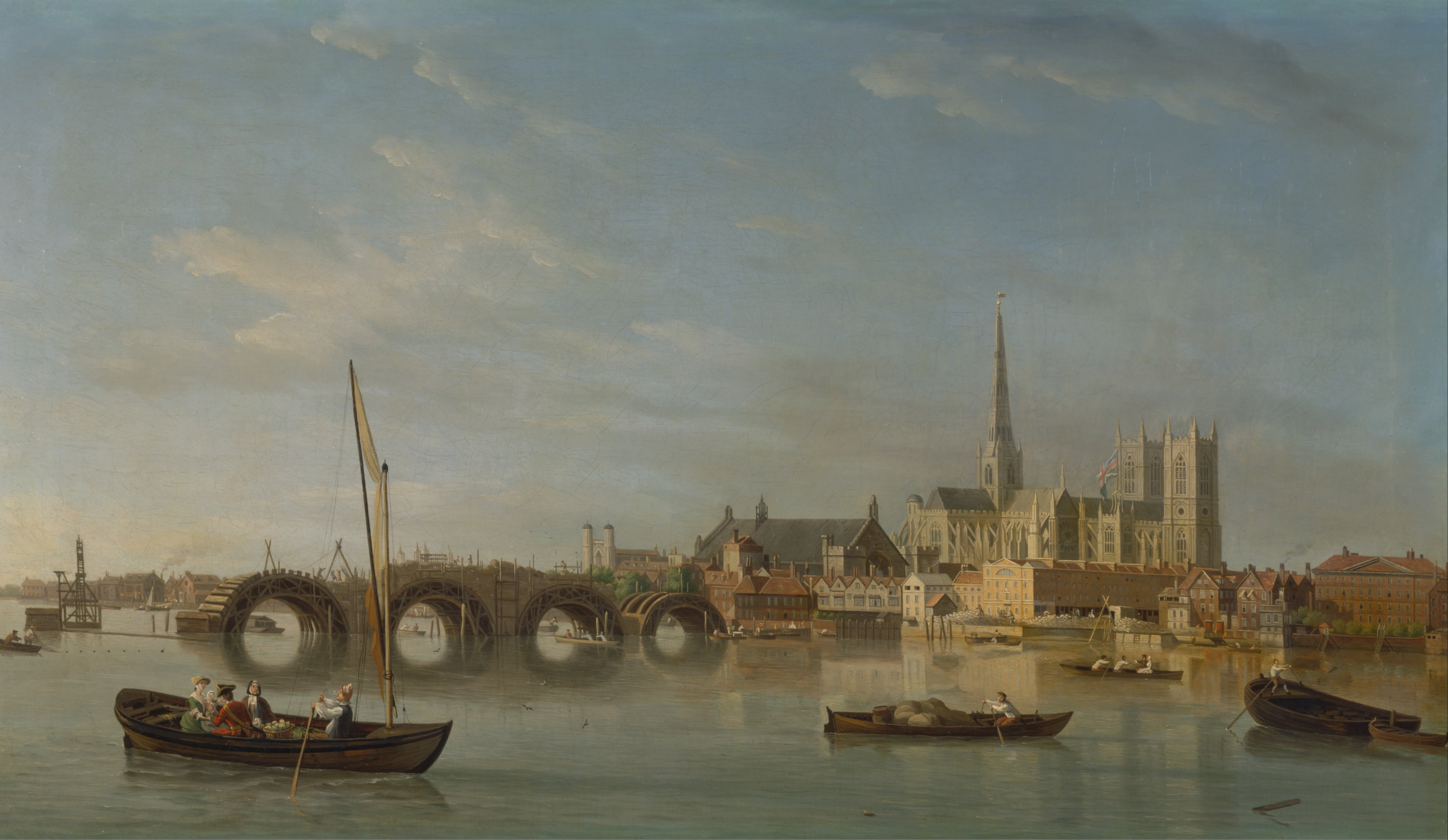
The Building of Westminster Bridge by Samuel Scott, 1742

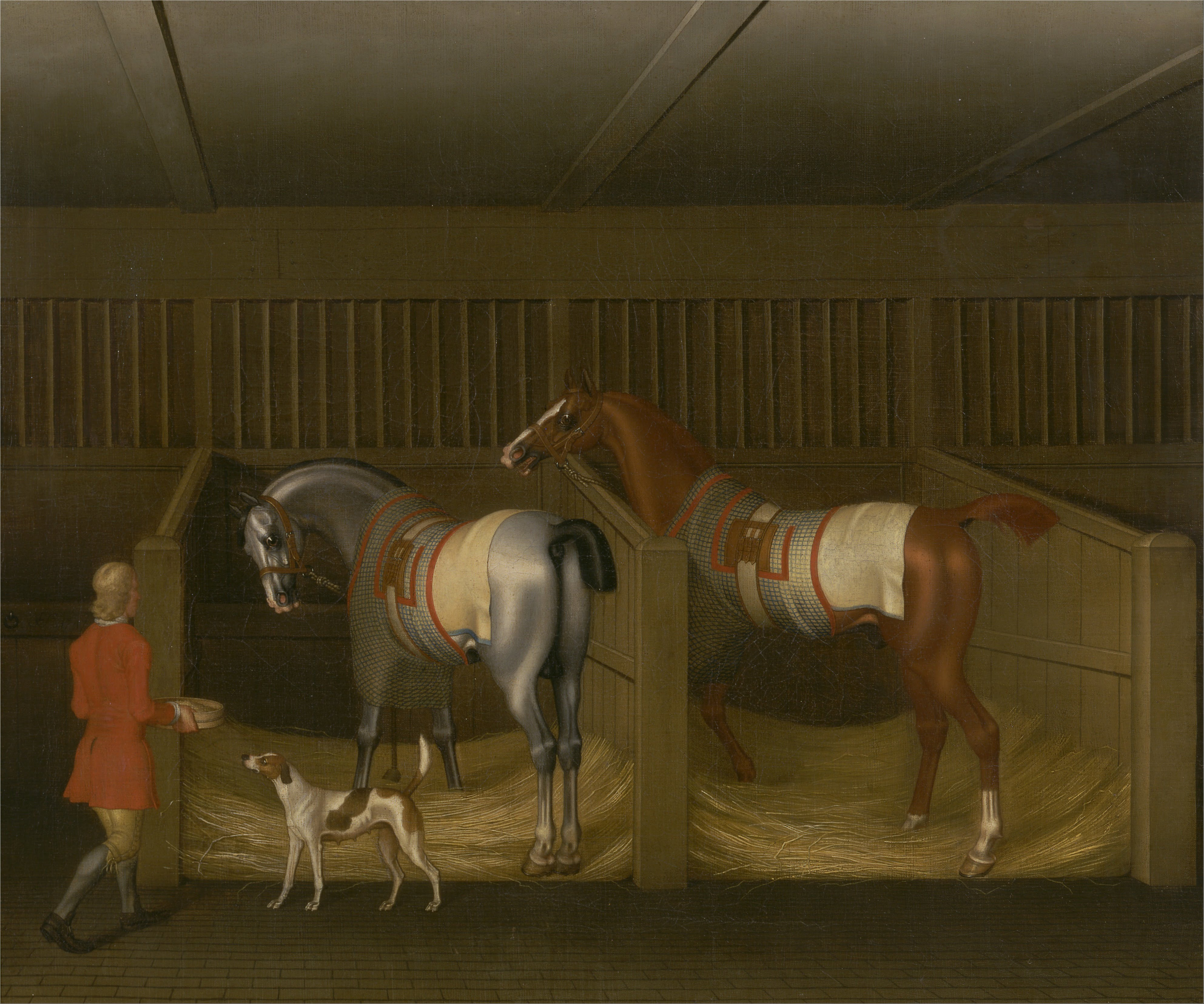
The Stables and Two Famous Running Horses belonging to His Grace, the Duke of Bolton, by James Seymour, 1747

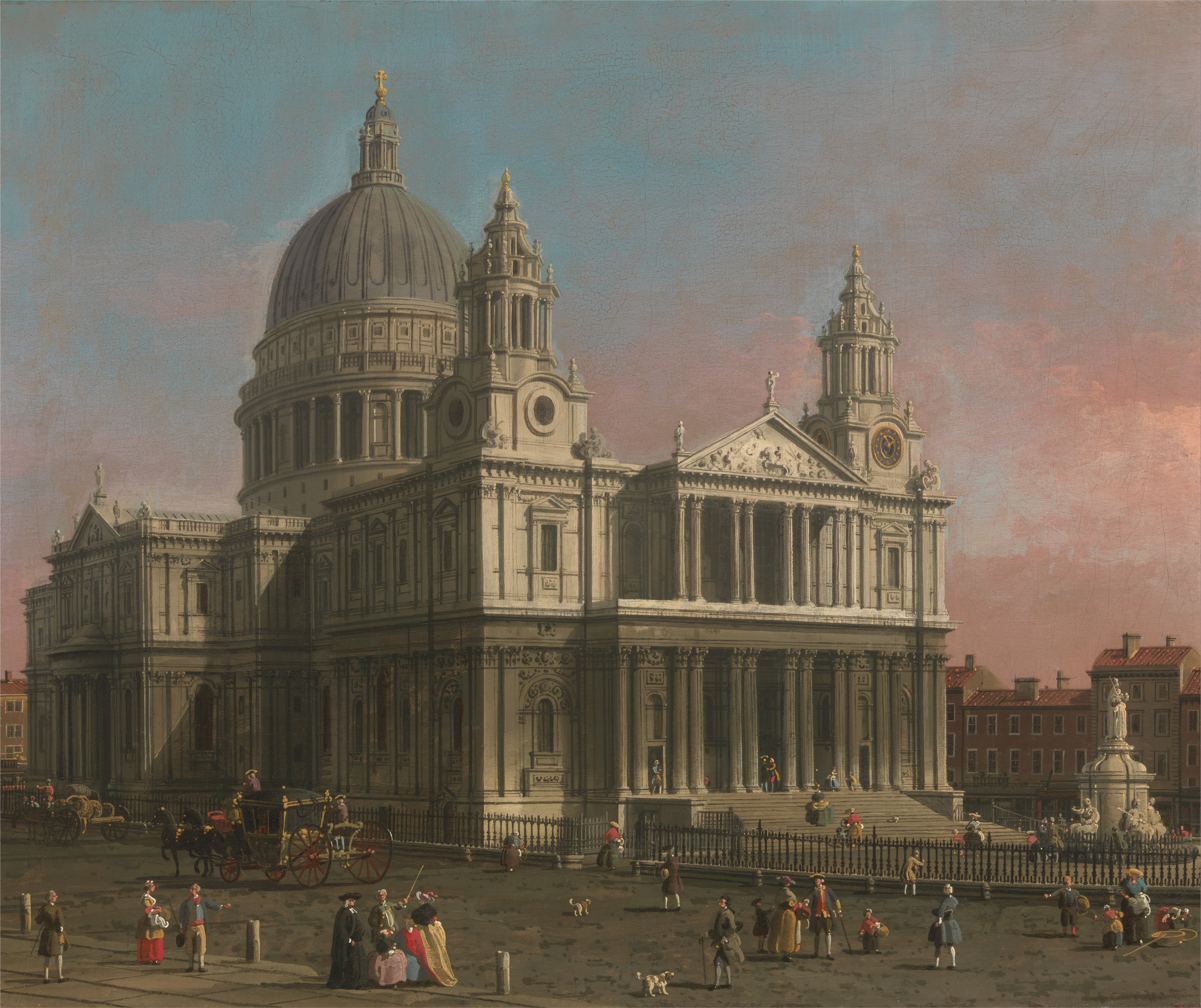
St. Paul's Cathedral by Canaletto, 1754

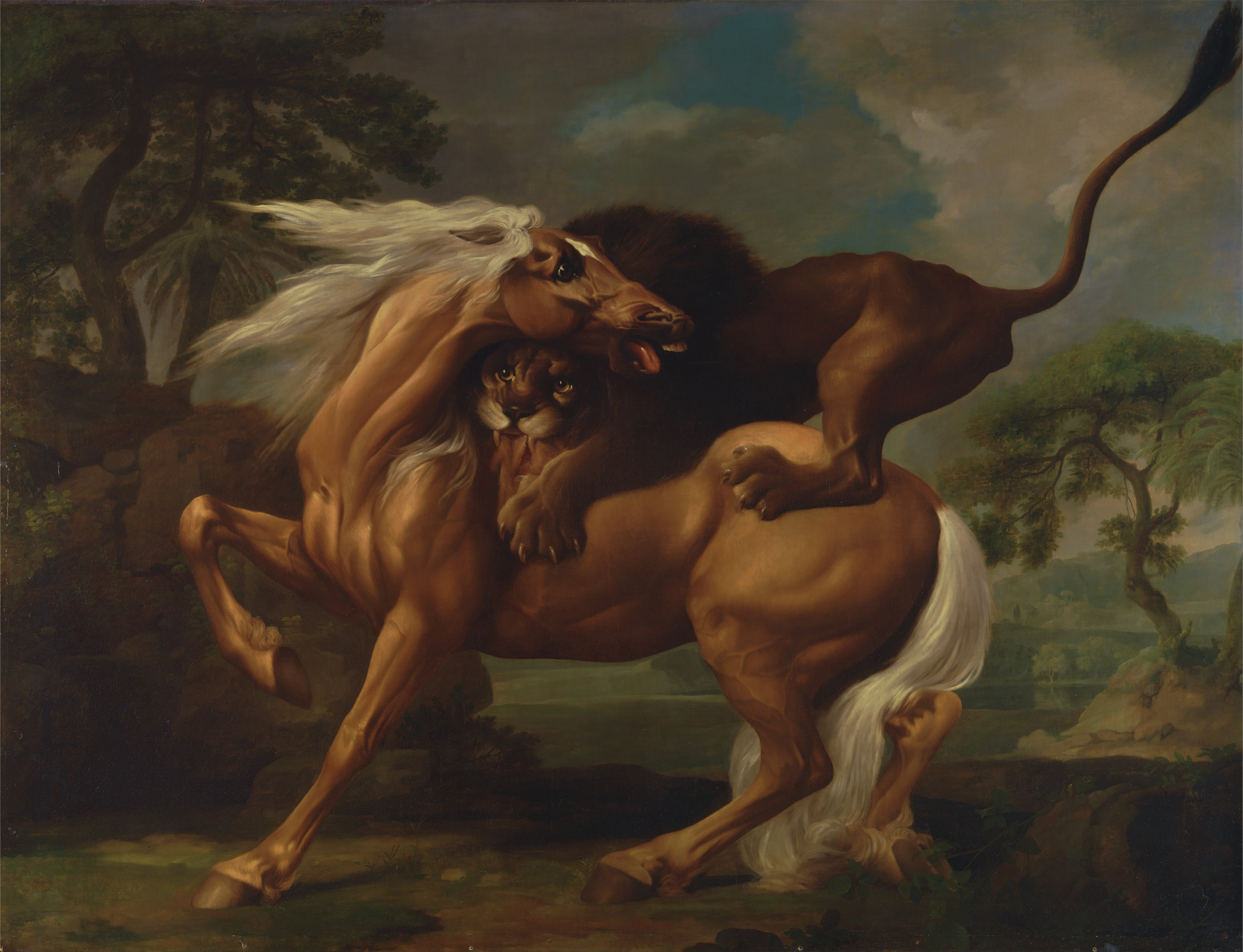
A Lion Attacking a Horse, by George Stubbs, 1762

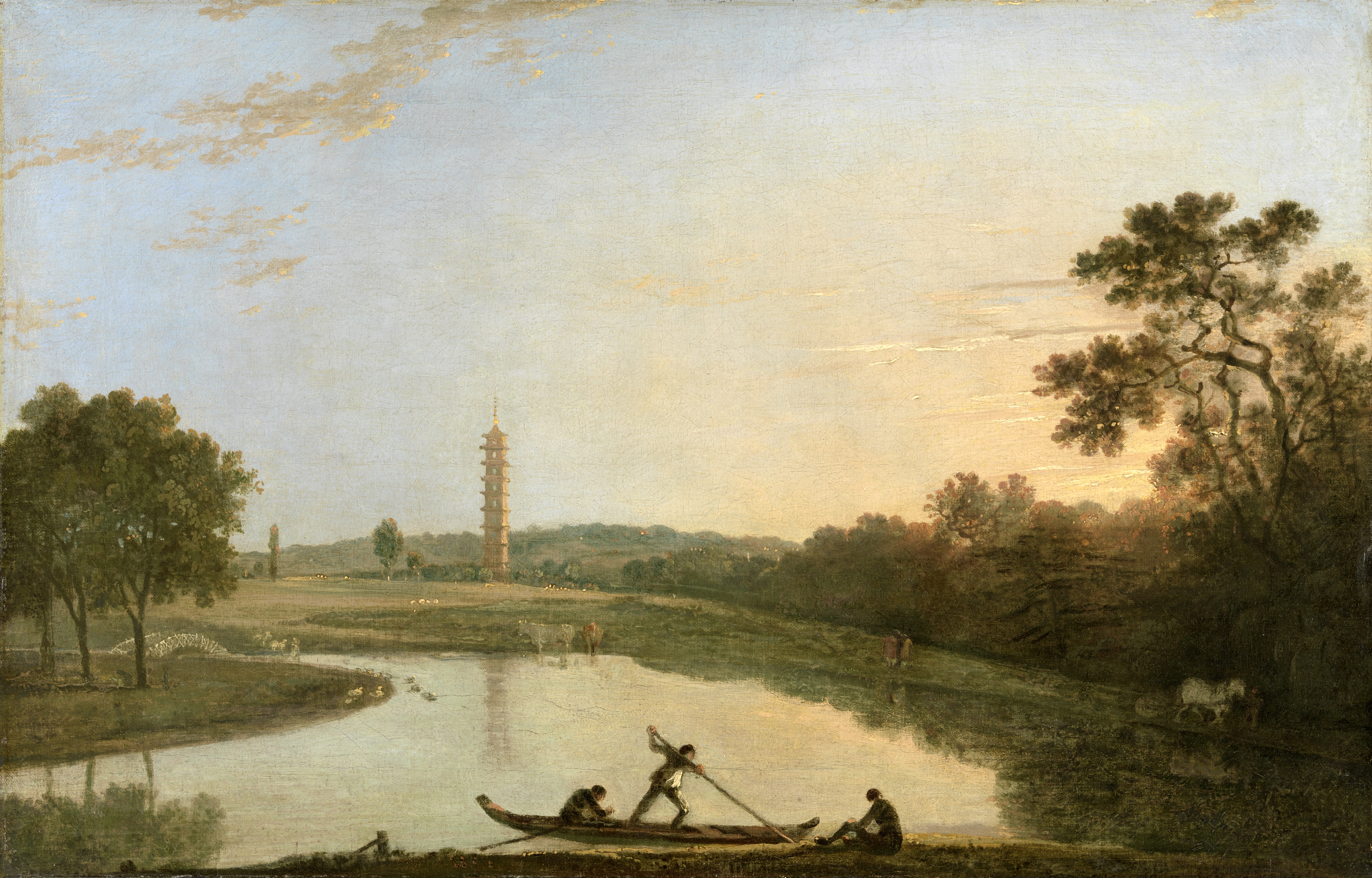
Kew Gardens: The Pagoda and Bridge by Richard Wilson, 1762

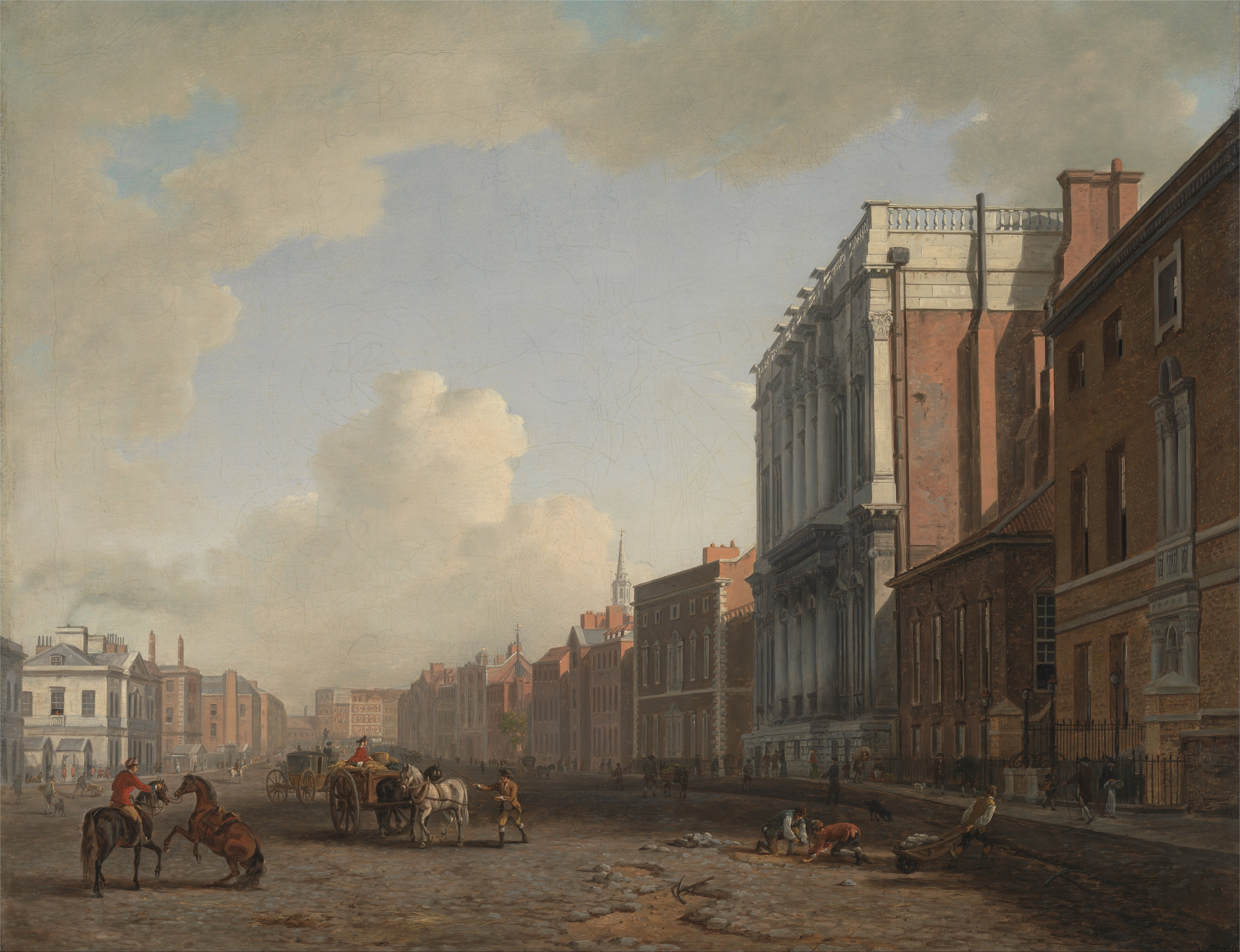
Whitehall, by William Marlow, 1775

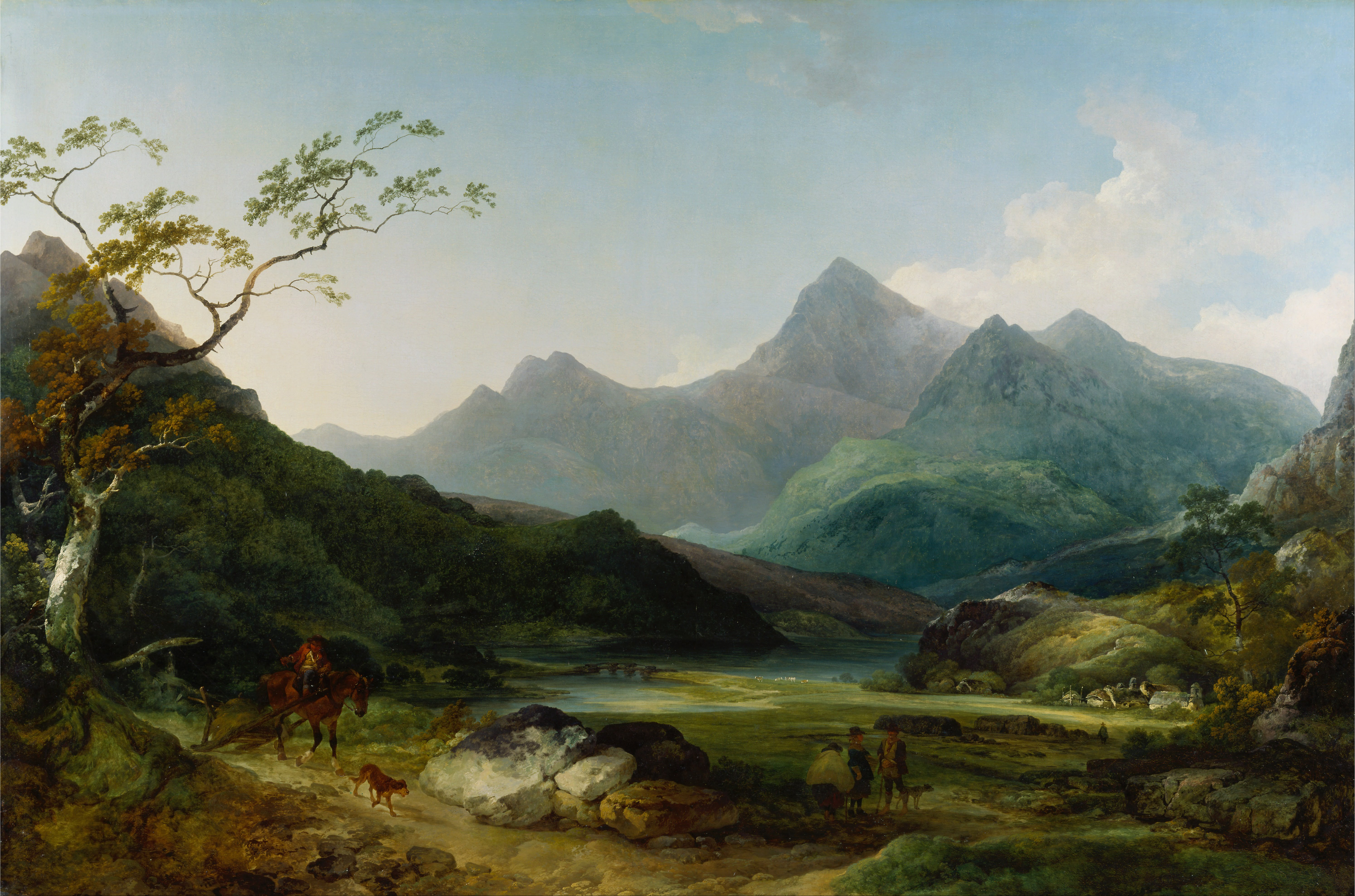
Snowdon from Capel Curig by Philip James de Loutherbourg, 1787

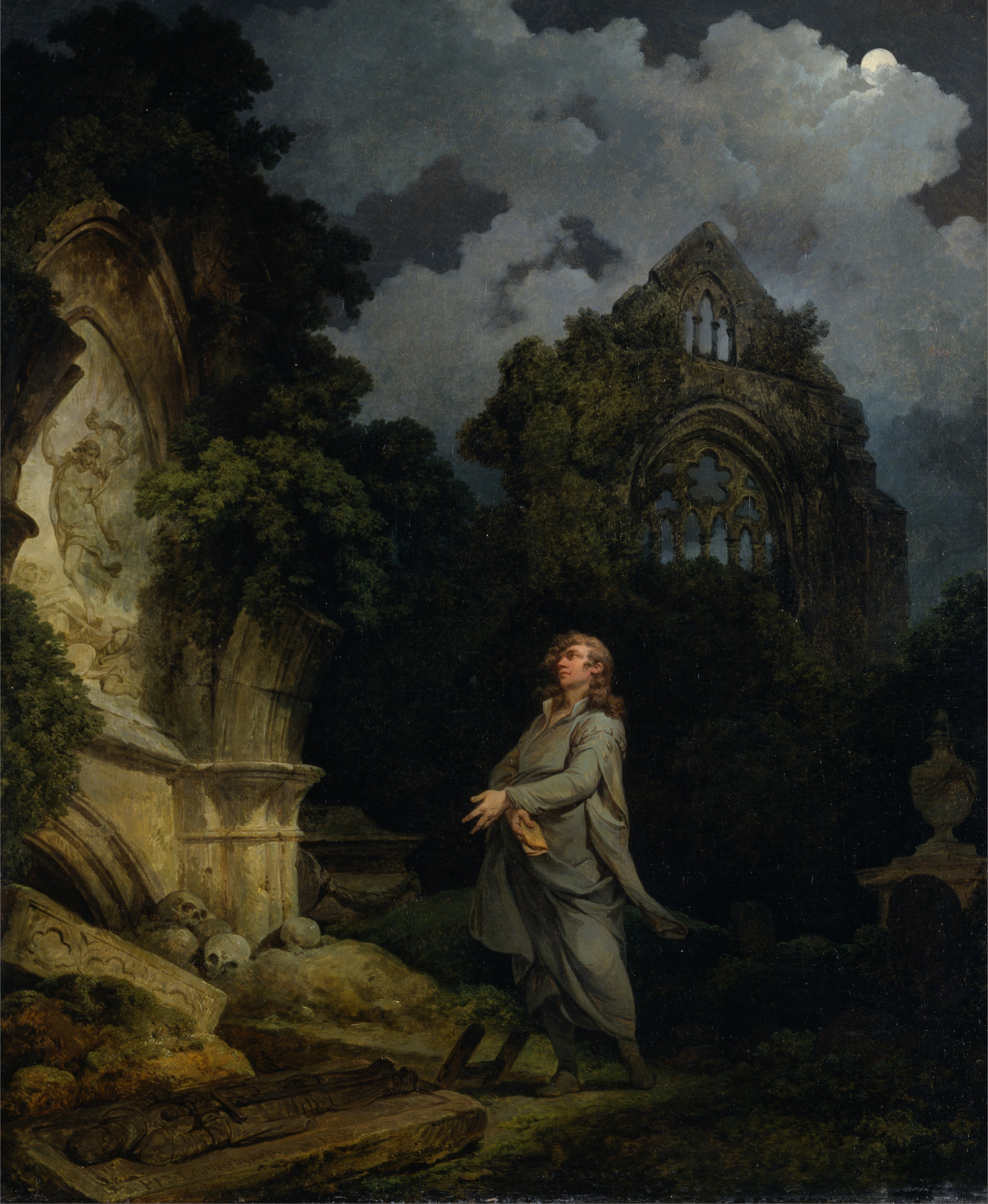
Visitor to a Moonlit Churchyard by Philip James de Loutherbourg, 1790

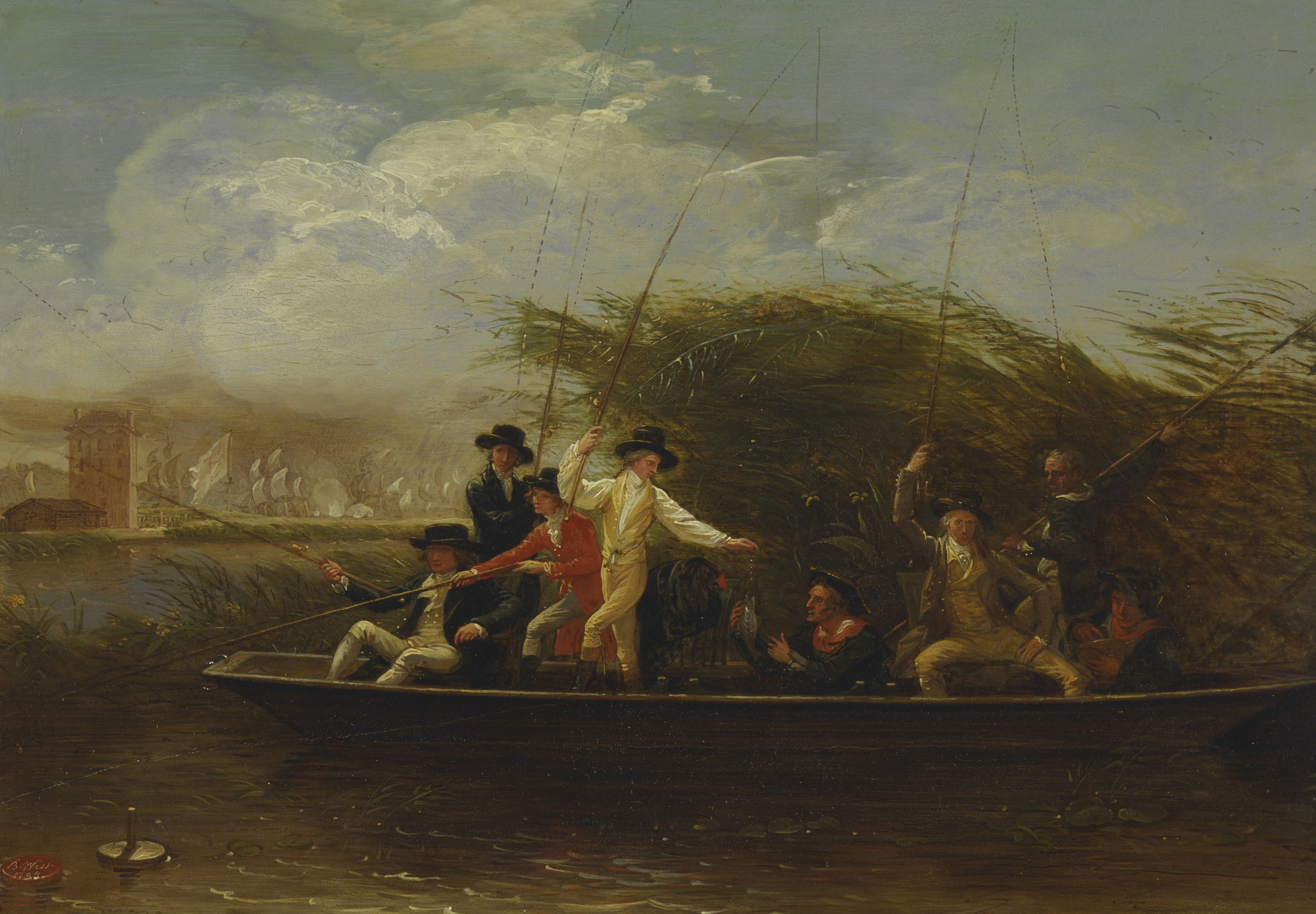
Gentlemen Fishing by Benjamin West, 1794

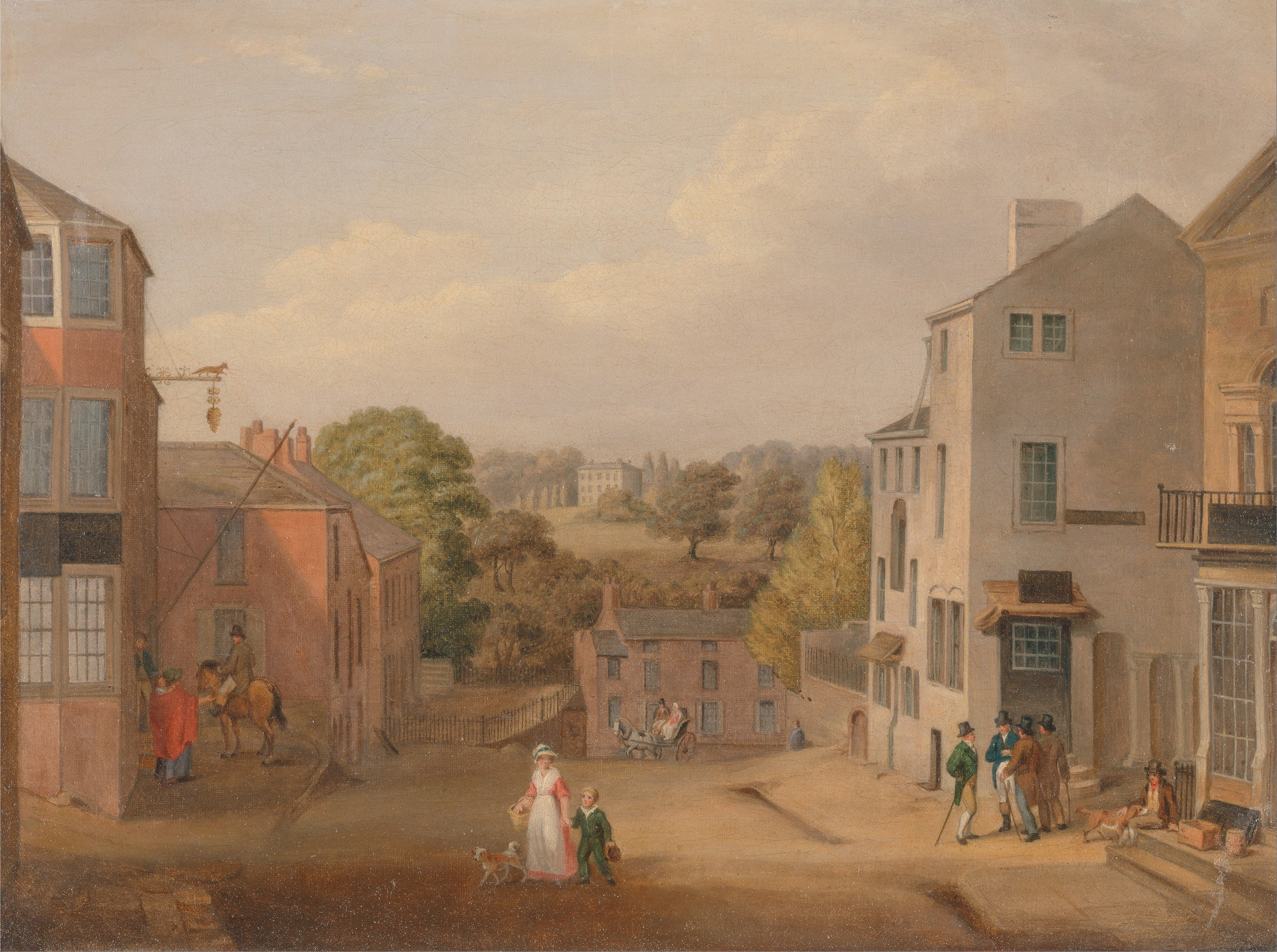
Street Scene in Chorley, Lancashire, with a view of Chorley Hall, by John Bird of Liverpool, c. 1795

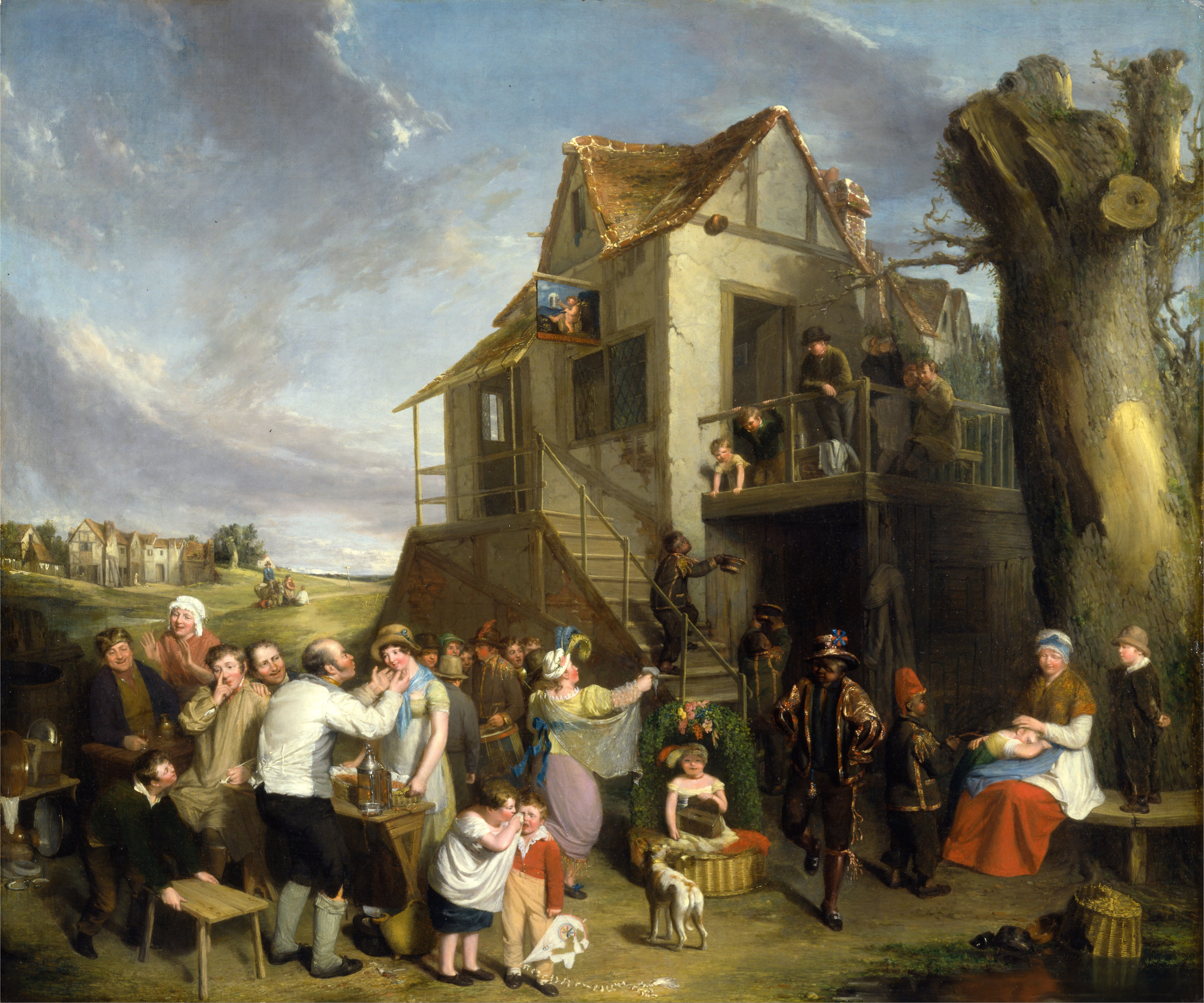
May Day by William Collins, 1812

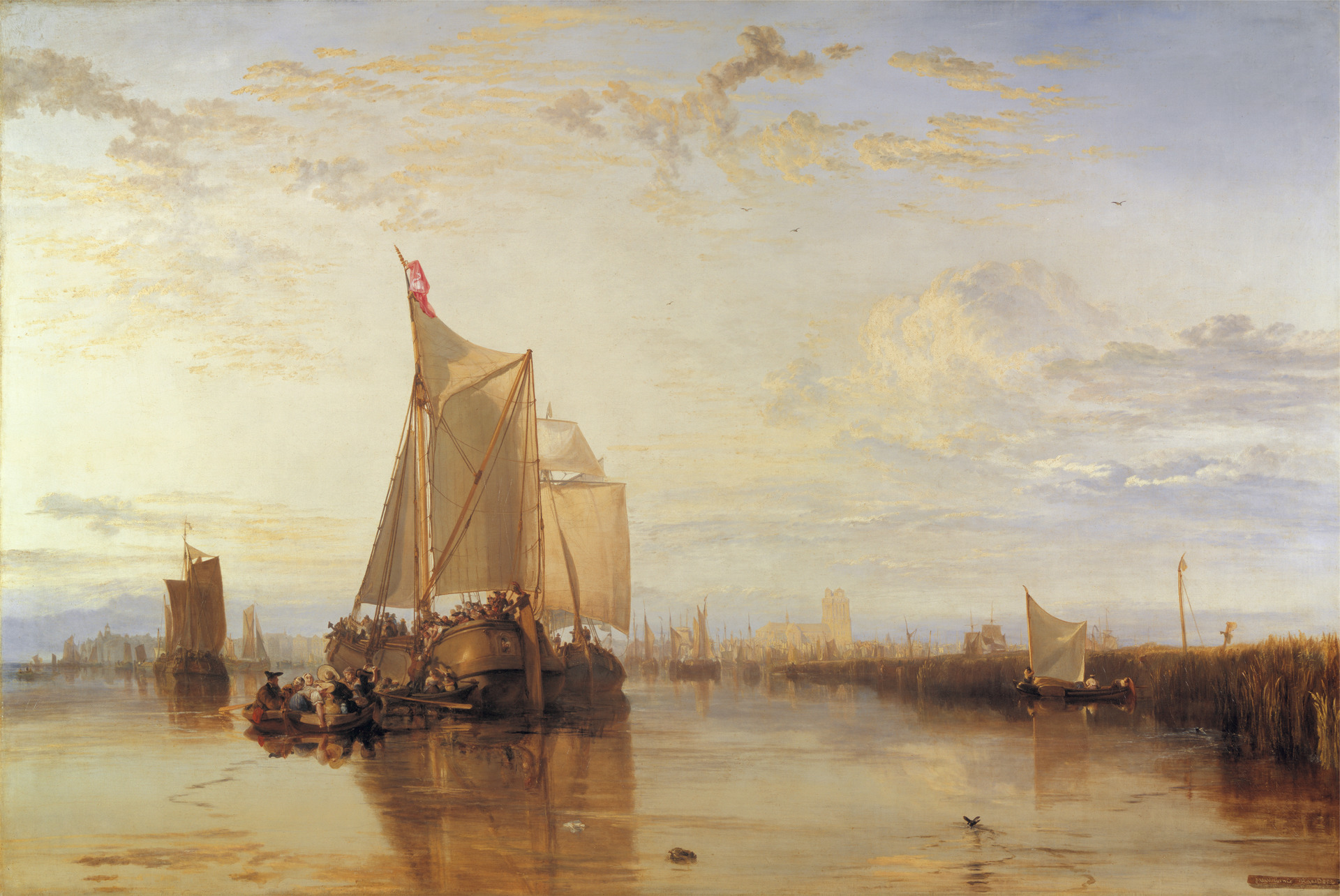
Dort or Dordrecht: The Dort packet-boat from Rotterdam becalmed, by J. M. W. Turner, c. 1818

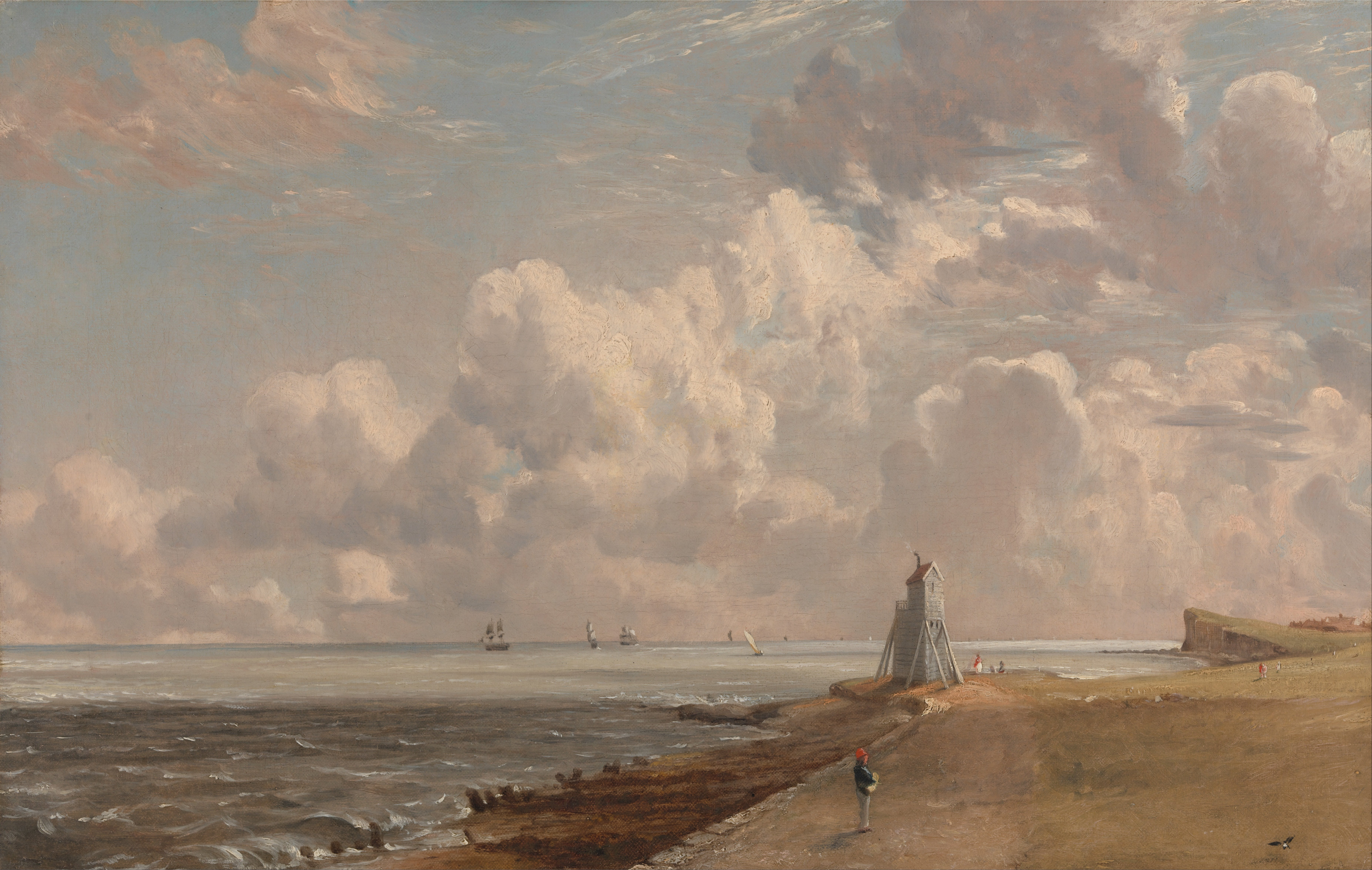
Harwich Lighthouse, by John Constable, 1820

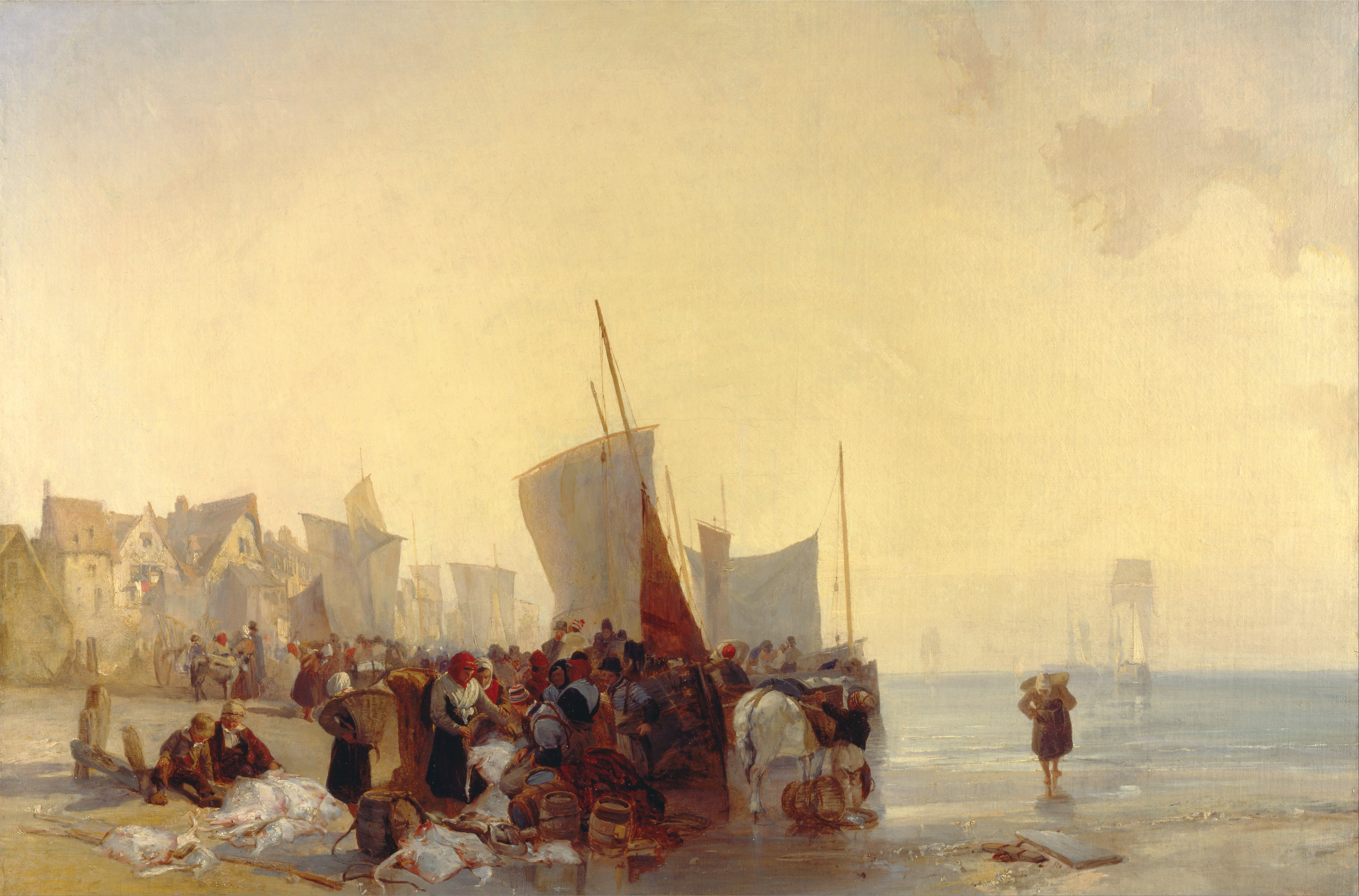
A Fishmarket near Boulogne by Richard Parkes Bonington, 1824

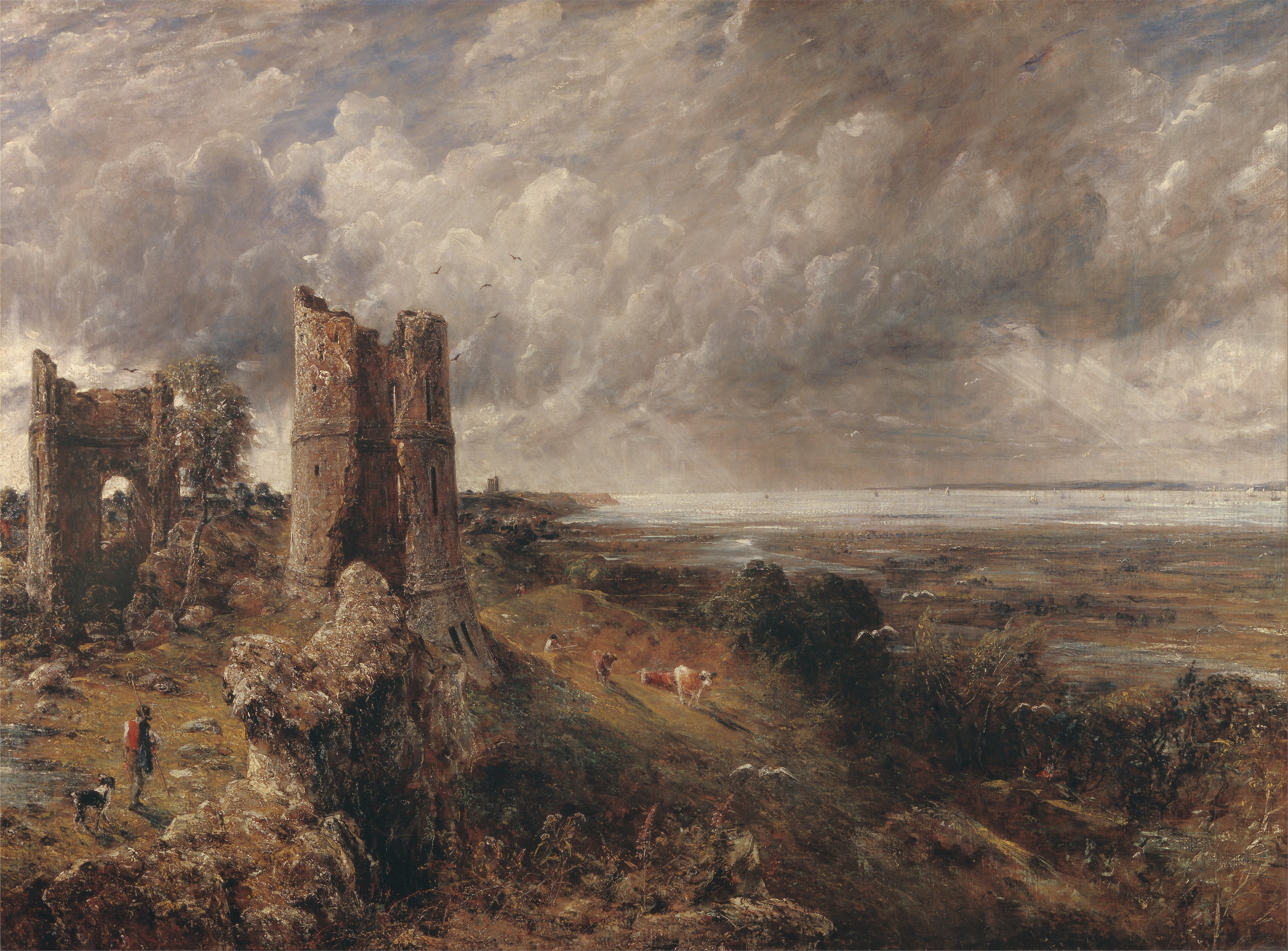
Hadleigh Castle, The Mouth of the Thames – Morning after a Stormy Night, by John Constable, 1829

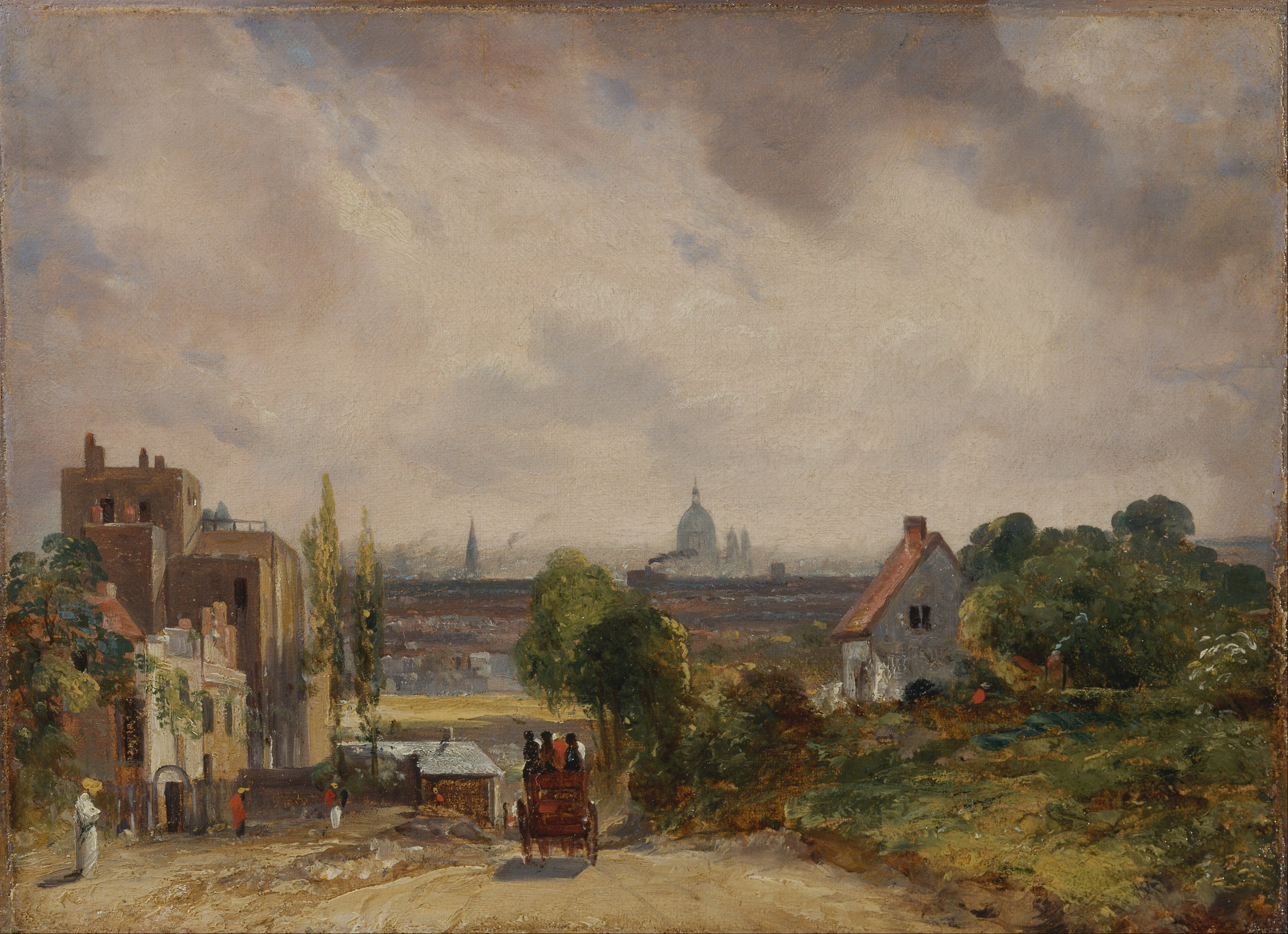
Sir Richard Steele's Cottage, Hampstead, by John Constable, 1832

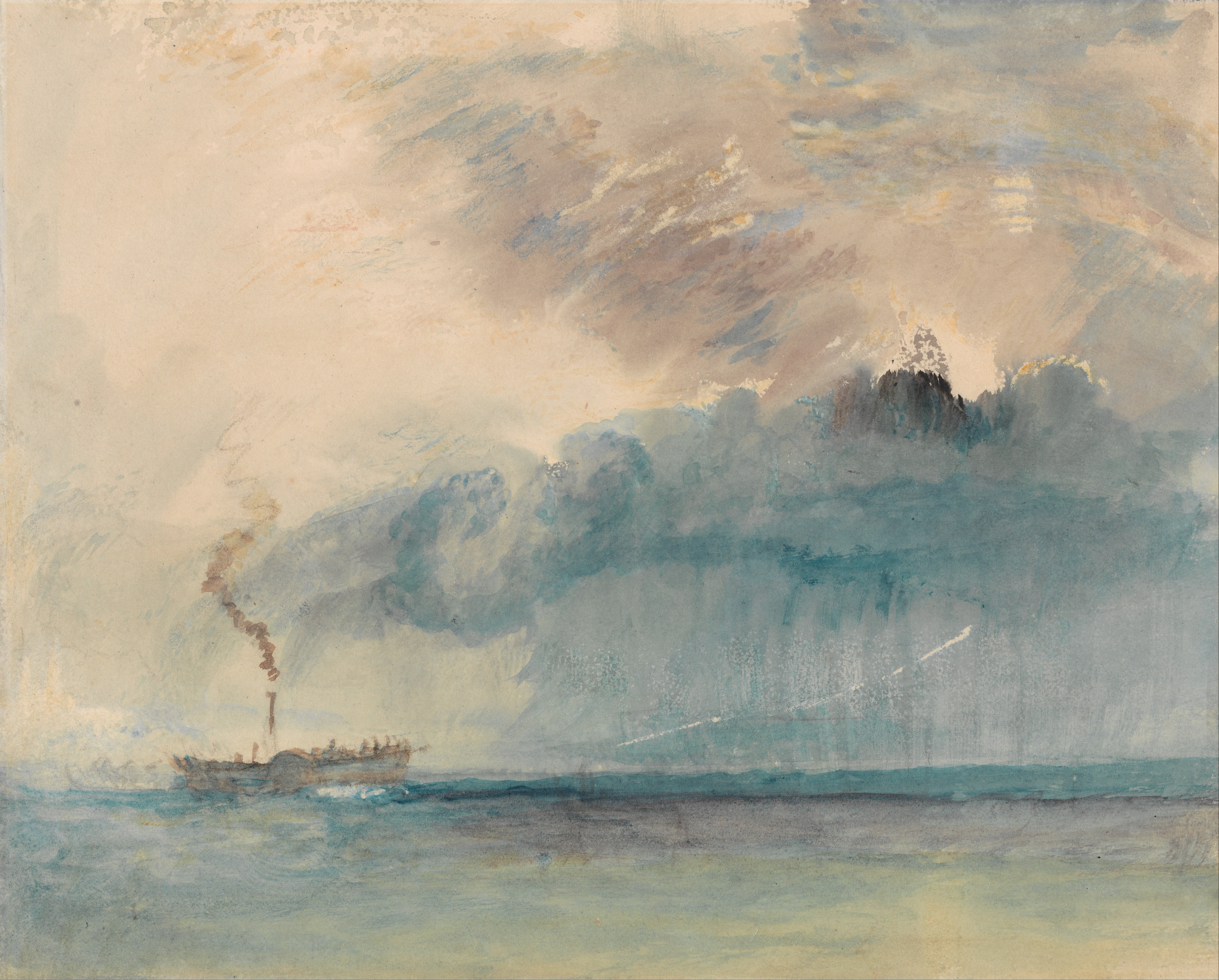
A Paddle-steamer in a Storm, watercolor by J. M. W. Turner, c. 1841

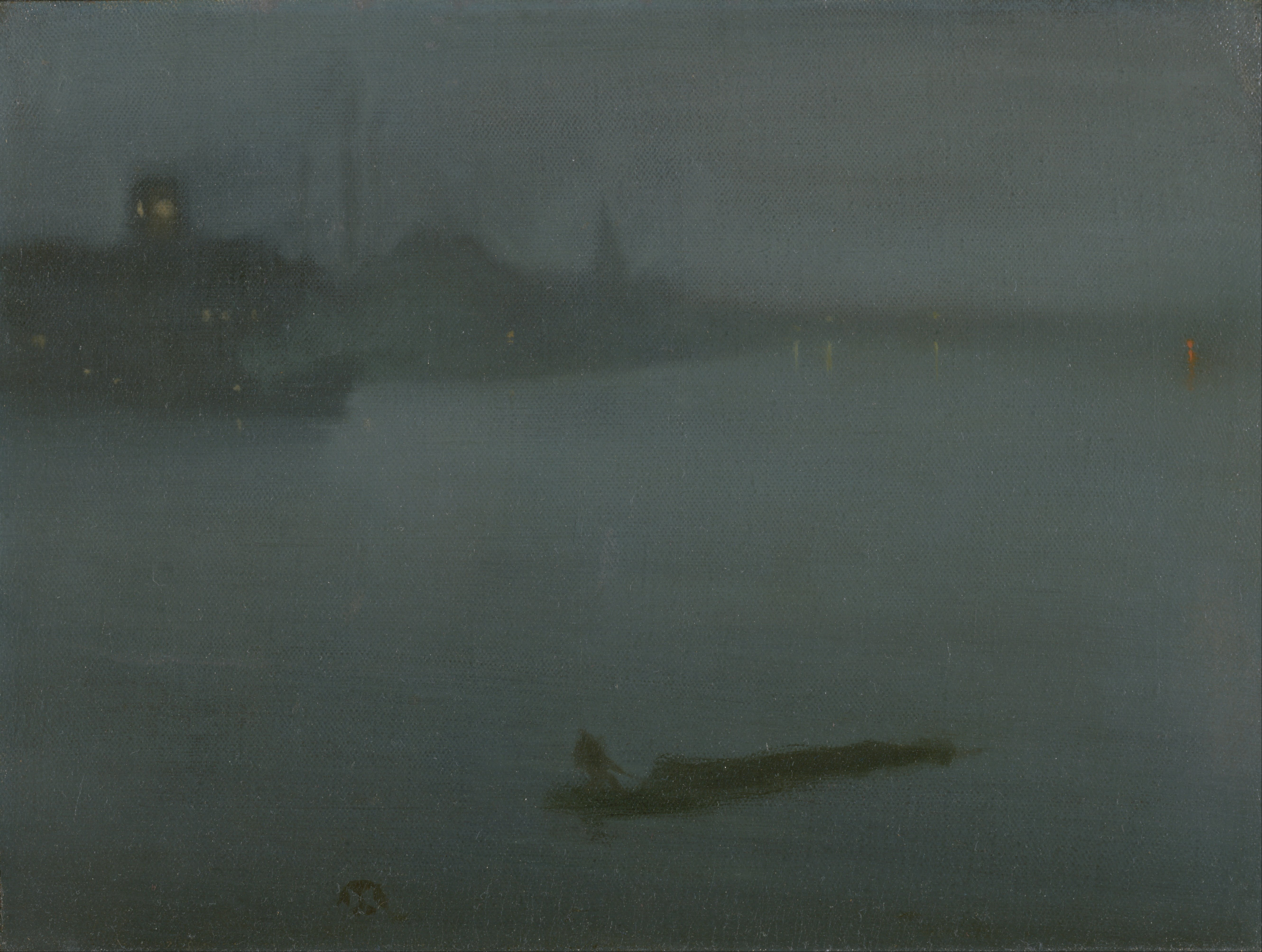
Nocturne in Blue and Silver, by James Abbott McNeill Whistler, c. 1872-1878
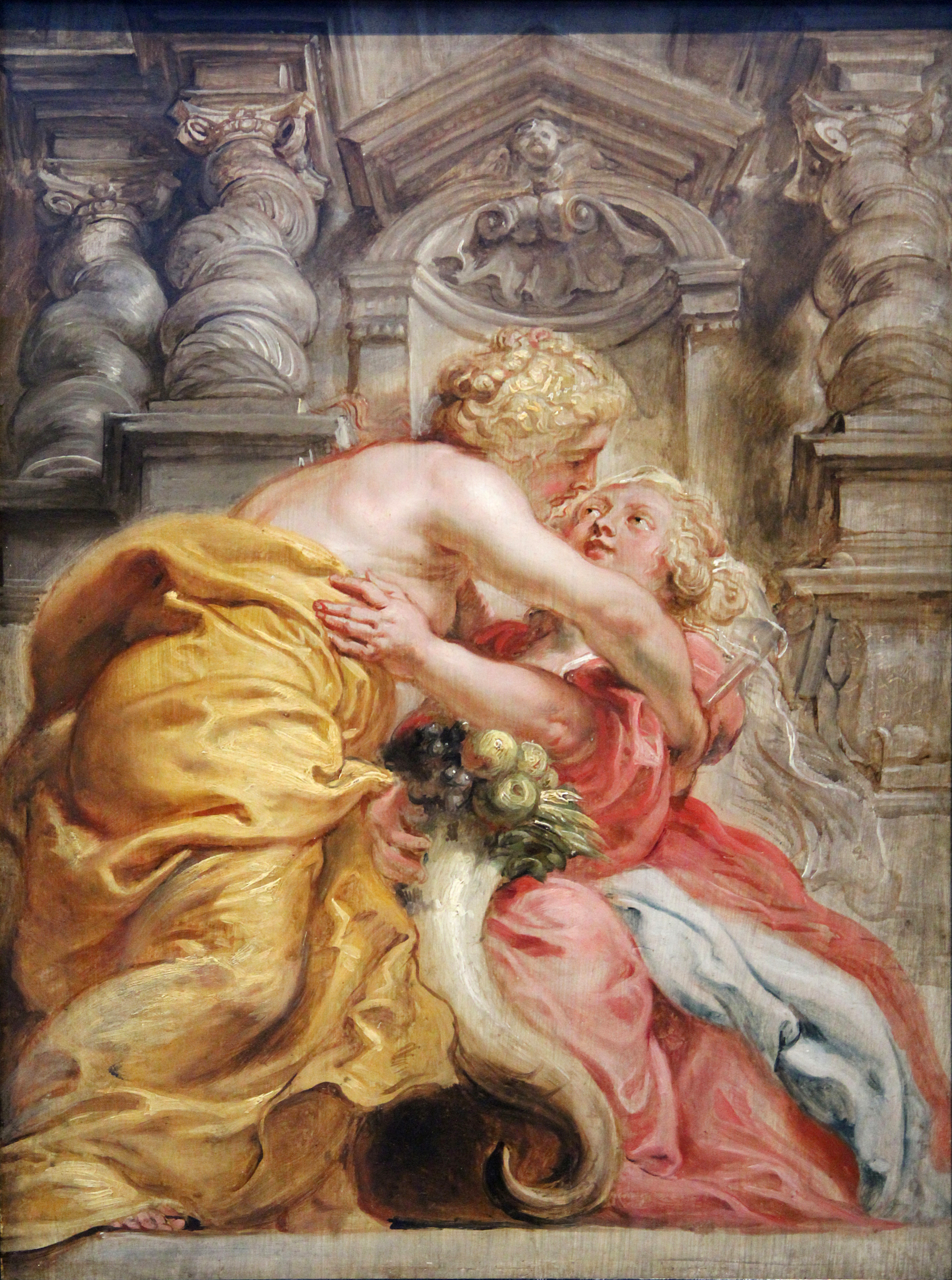
The Peace embracing the Abundance, Peter Paul Rubens, c. 1632-1633

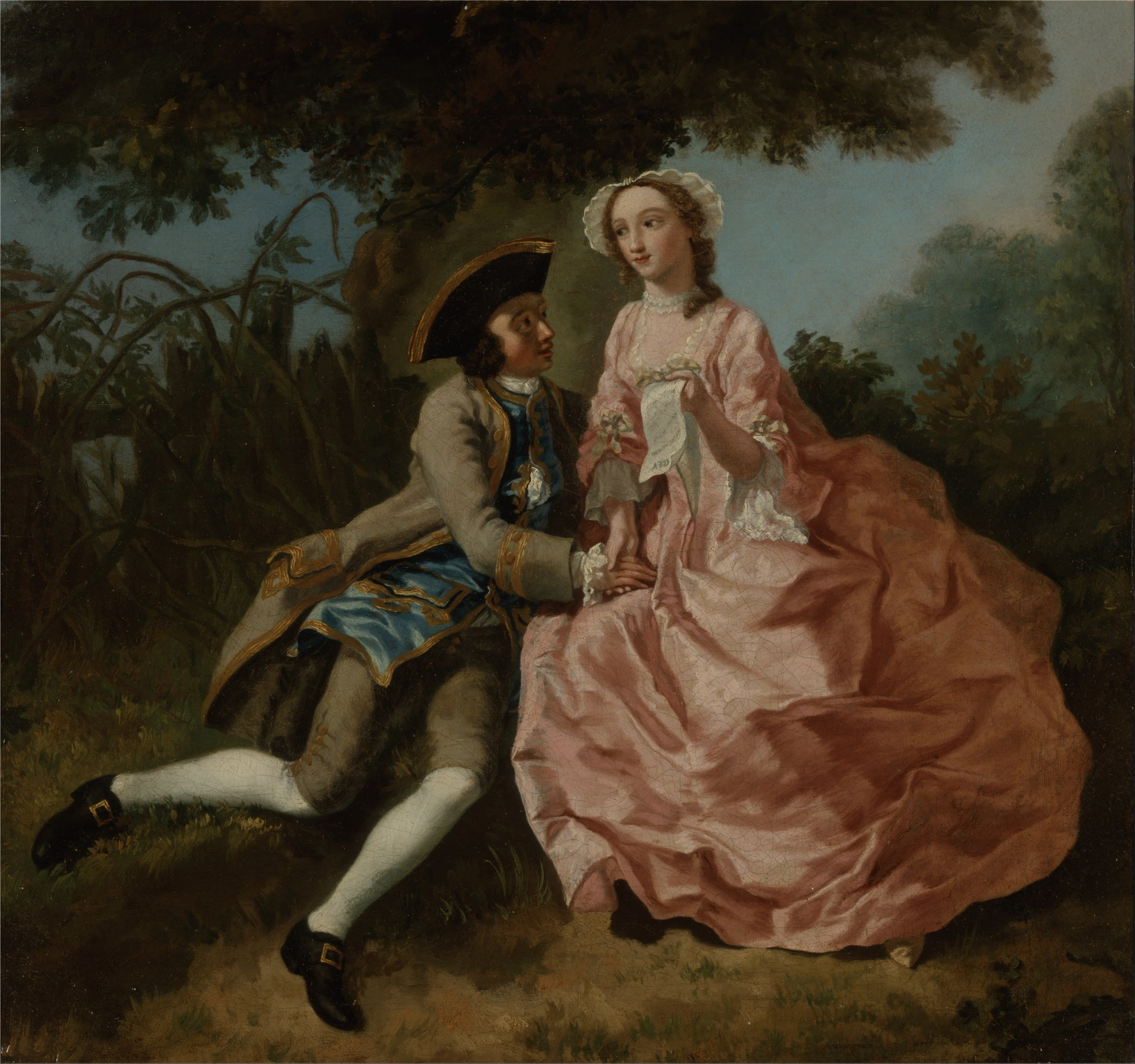
Lovers in a landscape, Petrus Johannes van Reysschoot, c. 1740

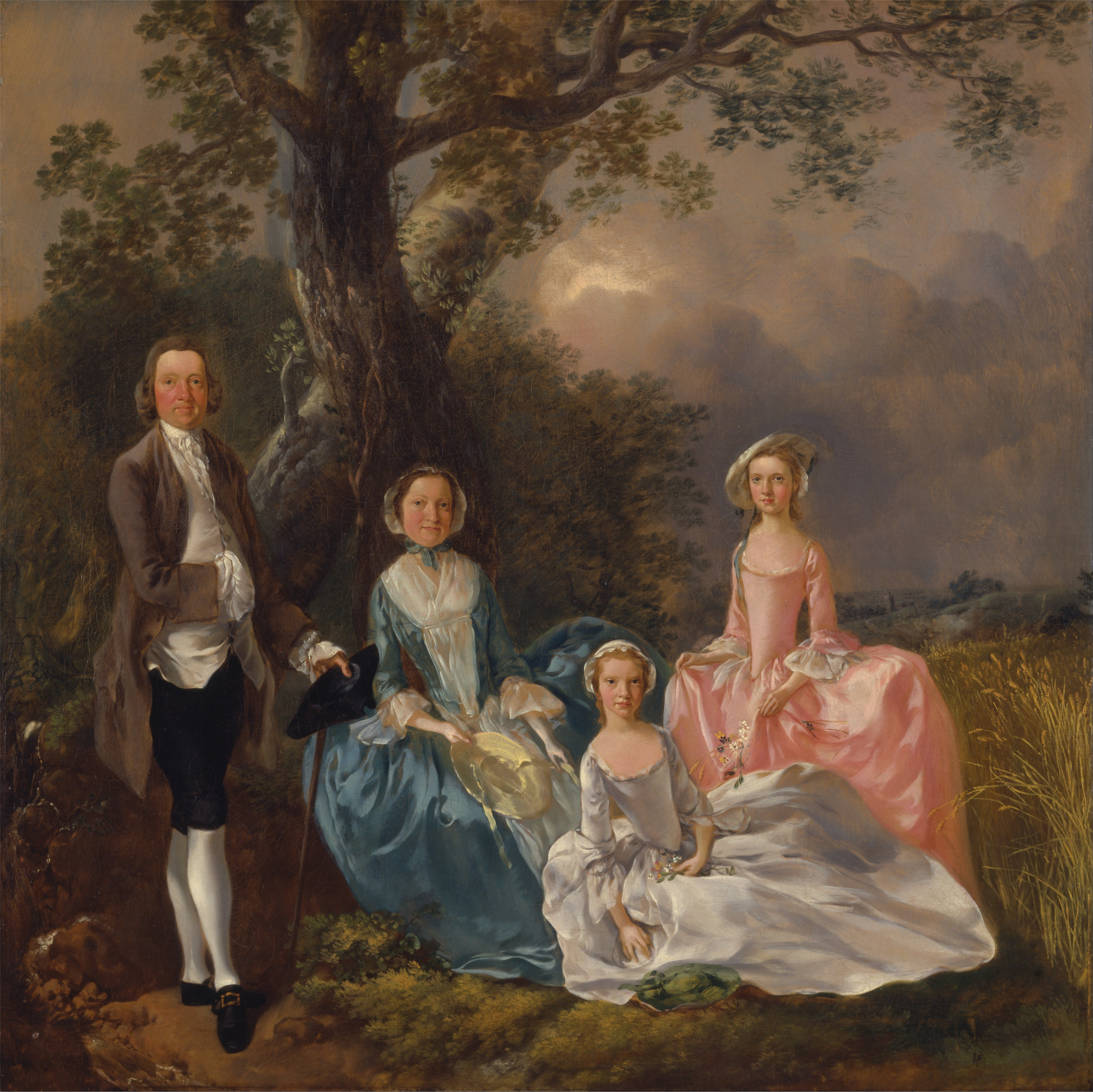
The Gravenor Family, by Thomas Gainsborough, 1754

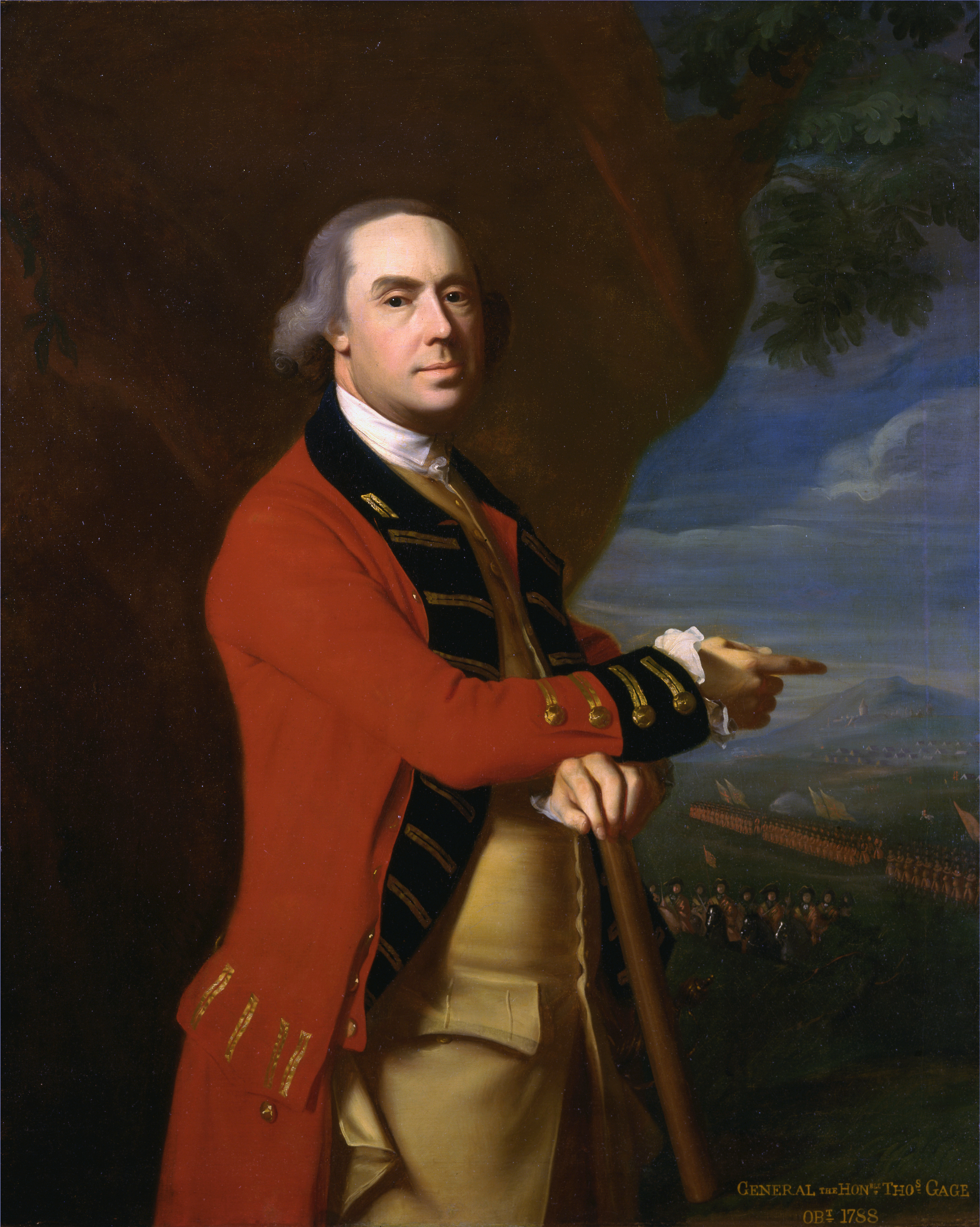
Portrait of Thomas Gage, by John Singleton Copley, 1768

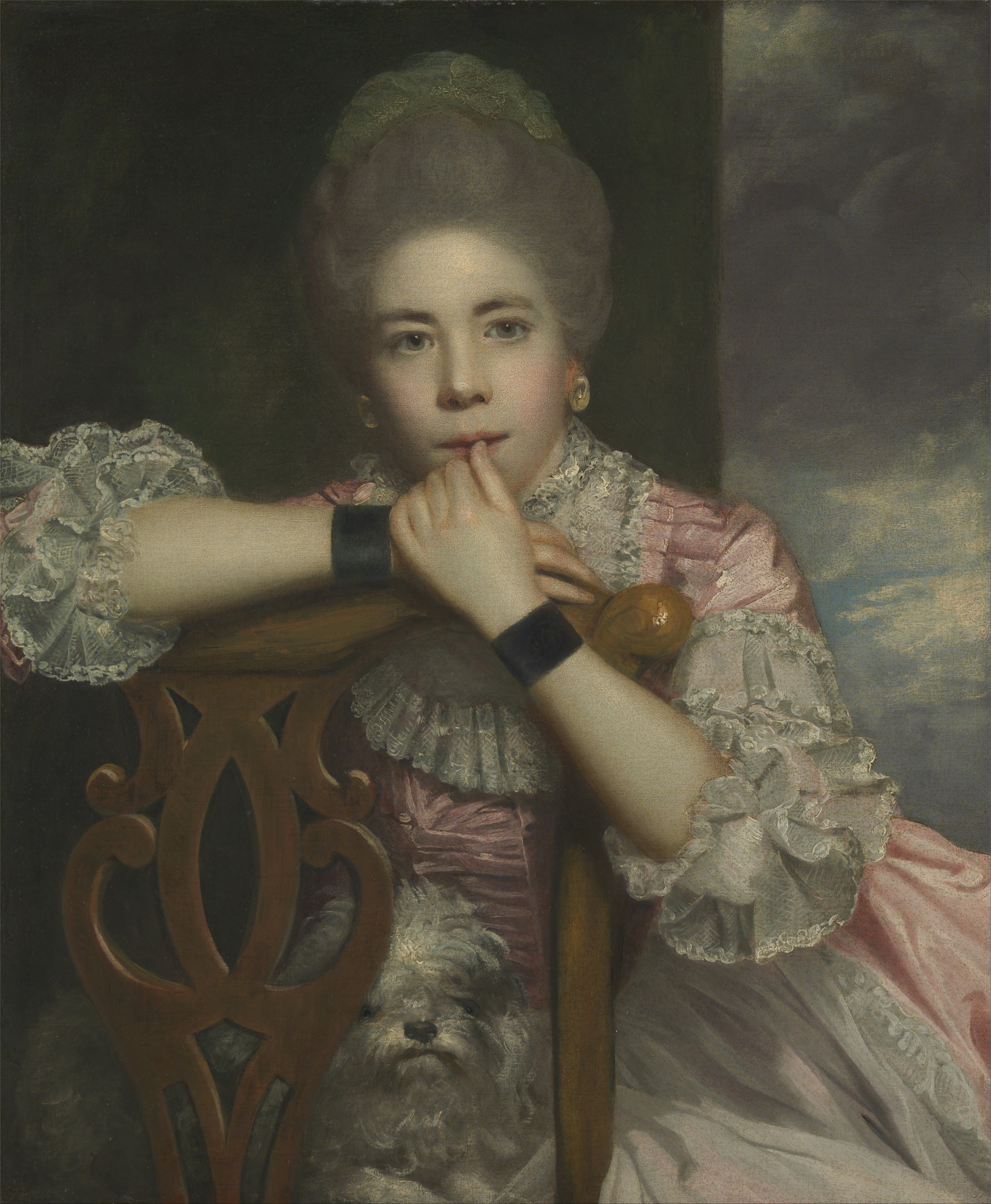
Mrs. Abington as Miss Prue in "Love for Love" by William Congreve, by Sir Joshua Reynolds, 1771

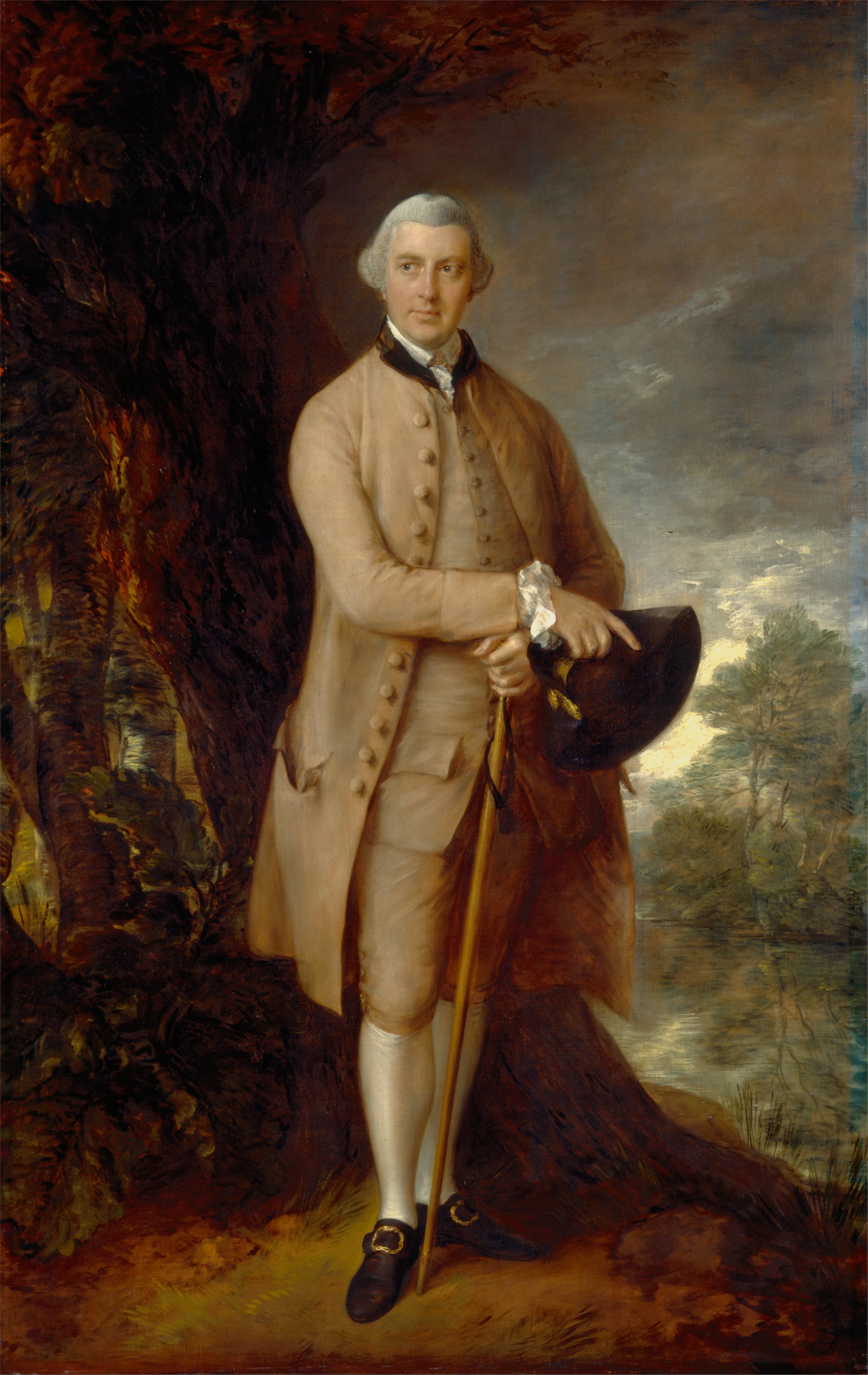
Portrait of Sir William Pulteney by Thomas Gainsborough, 1772

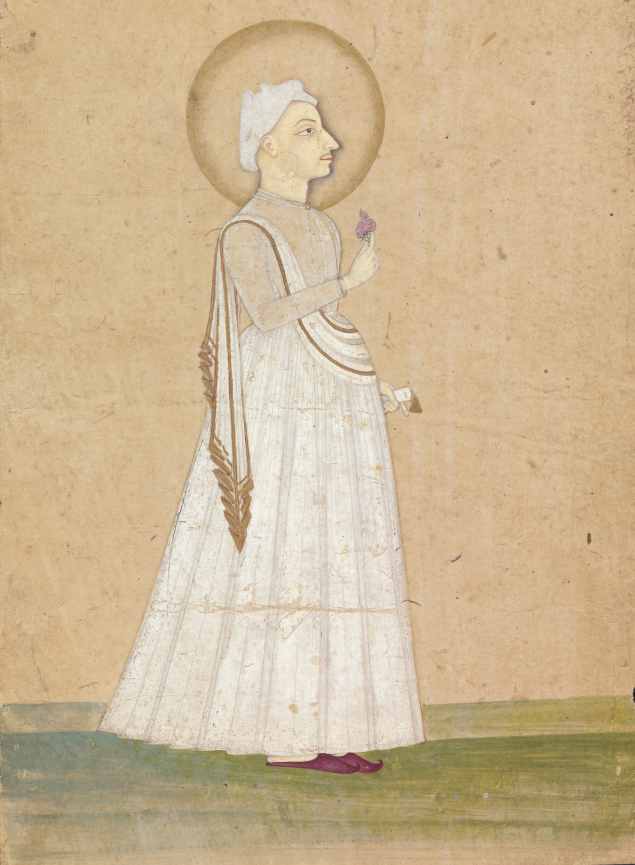
A portrait of an Indian Premier Madhavrao Peshwa, an 18th-century Noble, Statesman, Premier

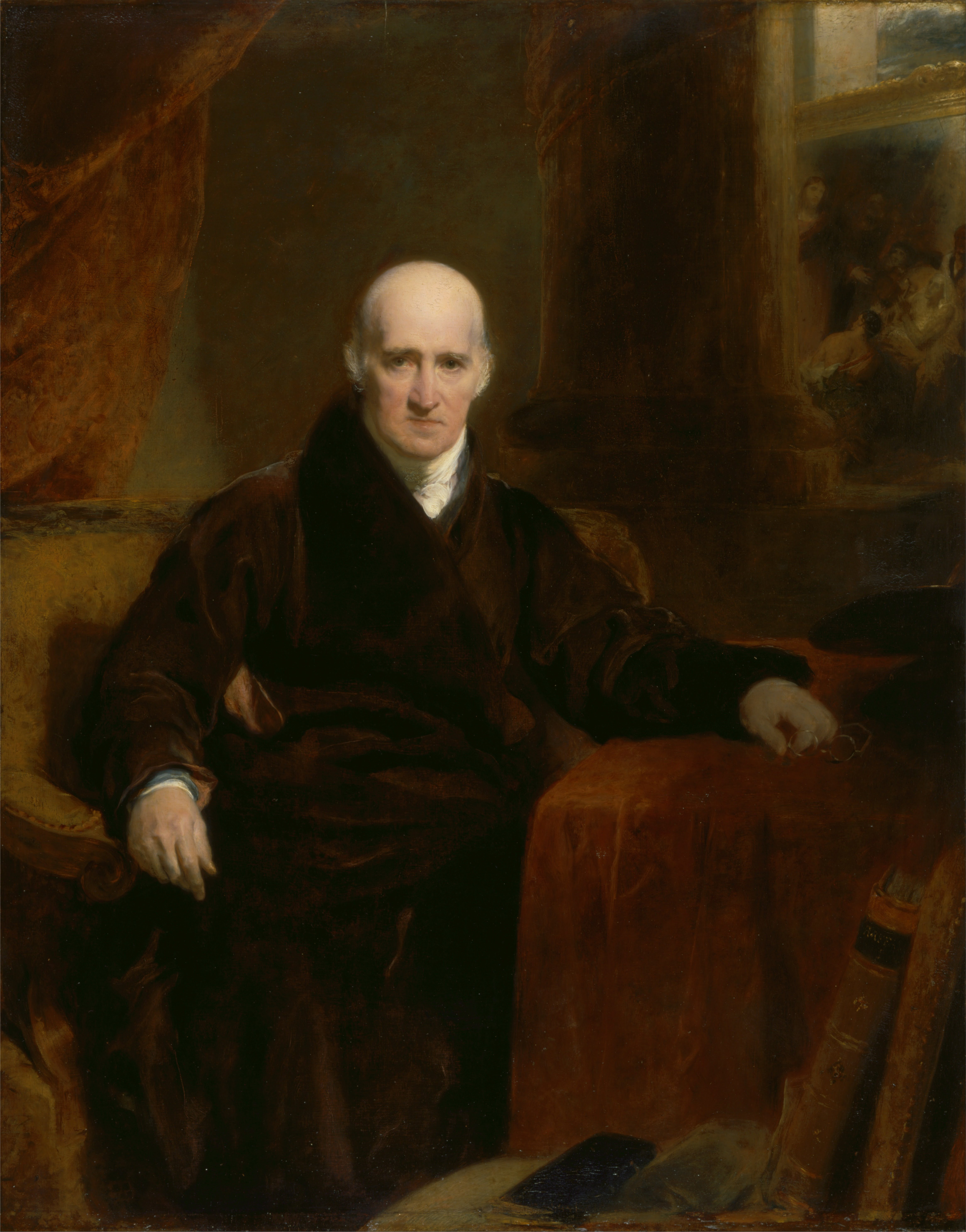
Portrait of Benjamin West, by Thomas Lawrence, 1810

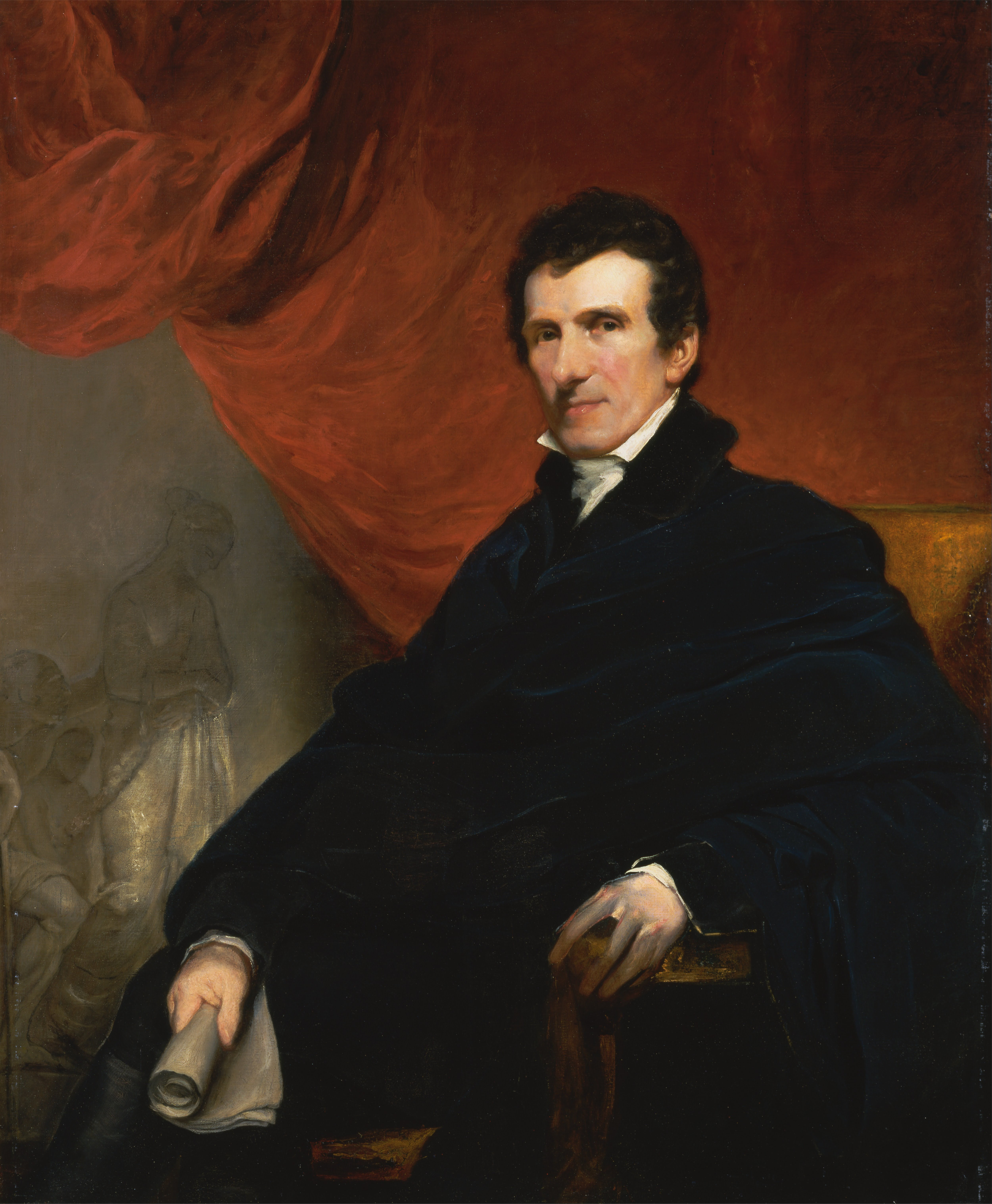
Portrait of Antonio Canova, by John Jackson, 1820

== See also ==
- Yale University Art Gallery
