= Whitehall (painting) =

Painting by William Marlow

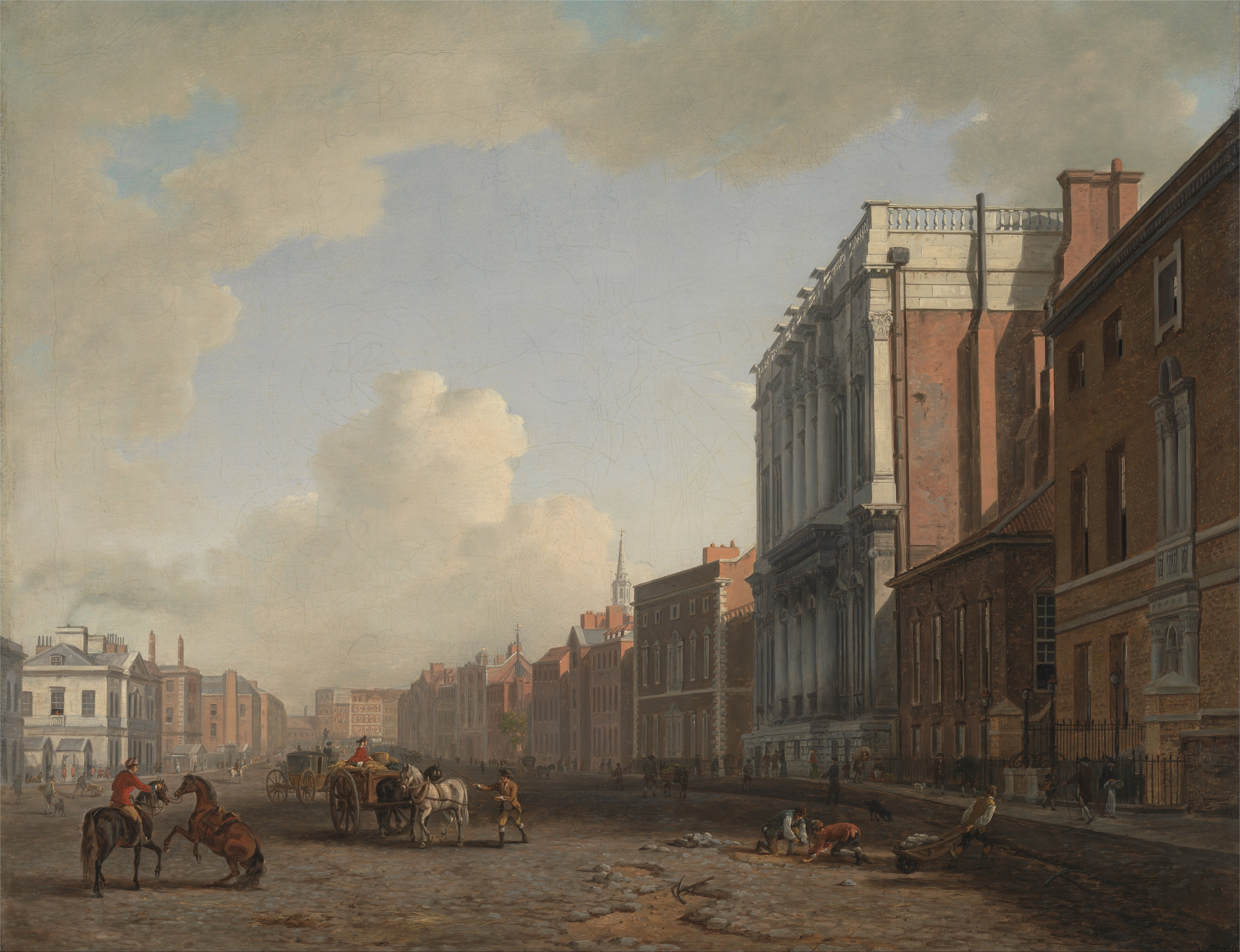
- Artist: William Marlow
- Year: c.1775
- Type: Oil on canvas, cityscape painting
- Dimensions: 71.1 cm × 91.1 cm (28.0 in × 35.9 in)
- Location: Yale Center for British Art, New Haven, Connecticut

Whitehall is a c.1775 oil painting by the British artist William Marlow. A cityscape, it looks northeast along Whitehall in London towards what is today Trafalgar Square. On the right is the Banqueting House designed by Inigo Jones, the only surviving element of the historic Palace of Whitehall. In the distance can be seen the spire St Martin-in-the-Fields. The entrance to Horse Guards is on the left. It captures the variety of buildings before large government offices began to dominate the street.

Marlow was a student of Samuel Scott and both produced many works featuring views of the capital. Today the painting is in the collection of the Yale Center for British Art, having been acquired as part of the Paul Mellon Collection.

== Bibliography ==
- Arnold, Dana. Reading Architectural History. Routledge, 2003.
- Darley, Gillian. John Soane: An Accidental Romantic. Yale University Press, 1999.
- Porter, Stephen. London A History in Paintings & Illustrations. Amberley Publishing, 2014.
- Van den Heuvel, Danielle. Early Modern Streets: A European Perspective. Taylor & Francis, 2022.
- Waterhouse, Ellis. Painting in Britain, 1530 to 1790. Yale University Press, 1994.
