= Ernst Willem Jan Bagelaar =

Dutch etcher

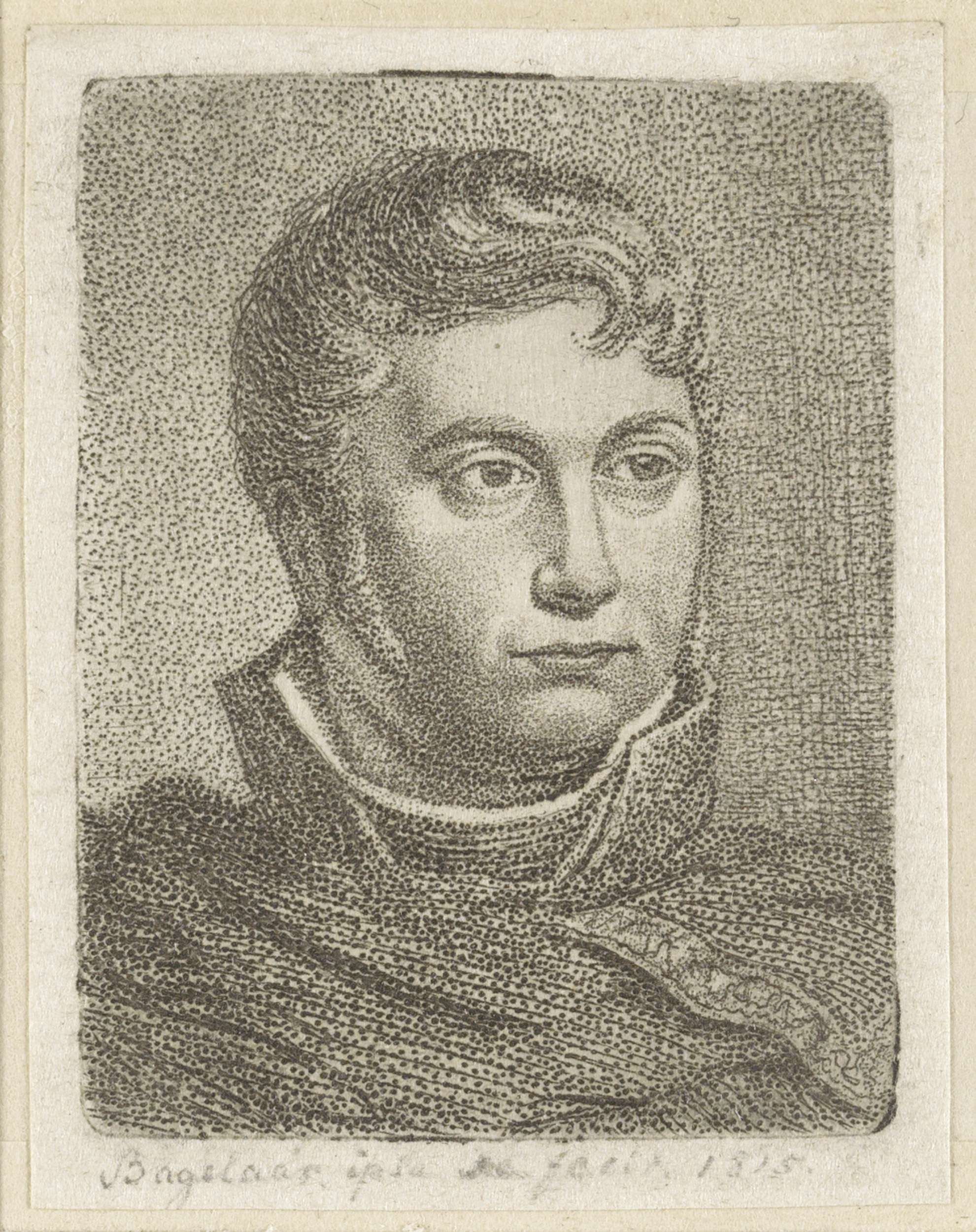
Portrait of Ernst Willem Jan Bagelaar

Ernst Willem Jan Bagelaar (16 September 1775 – 8 February 1837) was a Dutch etcher.

== Life ==
Bagelaar, who was born at Eindhoven in 1775, first entered the army, but early acquired a liking for the fine arts, and instructed himself in that of etching. He acquired further knowledge by travelling through Germany, and by a stay in Paris. Giving up soldiering, he retired to his property at Zon, near Eindhoven, where he died in 1837. His etchings, which are numerous, are executed in imitation of drawings. Many of them are landscapes from his own designs. The style of Jan Luyken had a special charm for him, and he possessed a considerable collection of his drawings. The following will show the variety of his subjects:

- Ruth and Boaz; after Luyken.
- Daniel in prayer; after the same.
- The sleeping Jew; after Rembrandt.
- Portrait of J. W. Pieneman; after J. W. Pieneman.
- Portrait of the poet Janus Secundus; after J. van Schoreel.
- View of Arnheim; after Schelfhout.
- Sea-piece; after Van Goijen.
- Storm at Sea; after L. Bakhuisen.
- A set of six plates of Cows; after A. Cuijp (one of his best works).
- Two Cows; after A. van de Velde.
- A Sheep; after Berchem.
- A Sheep; after Dujardin.
