= The Conjuror (Hone) =

Painting by Nathaniel Hone

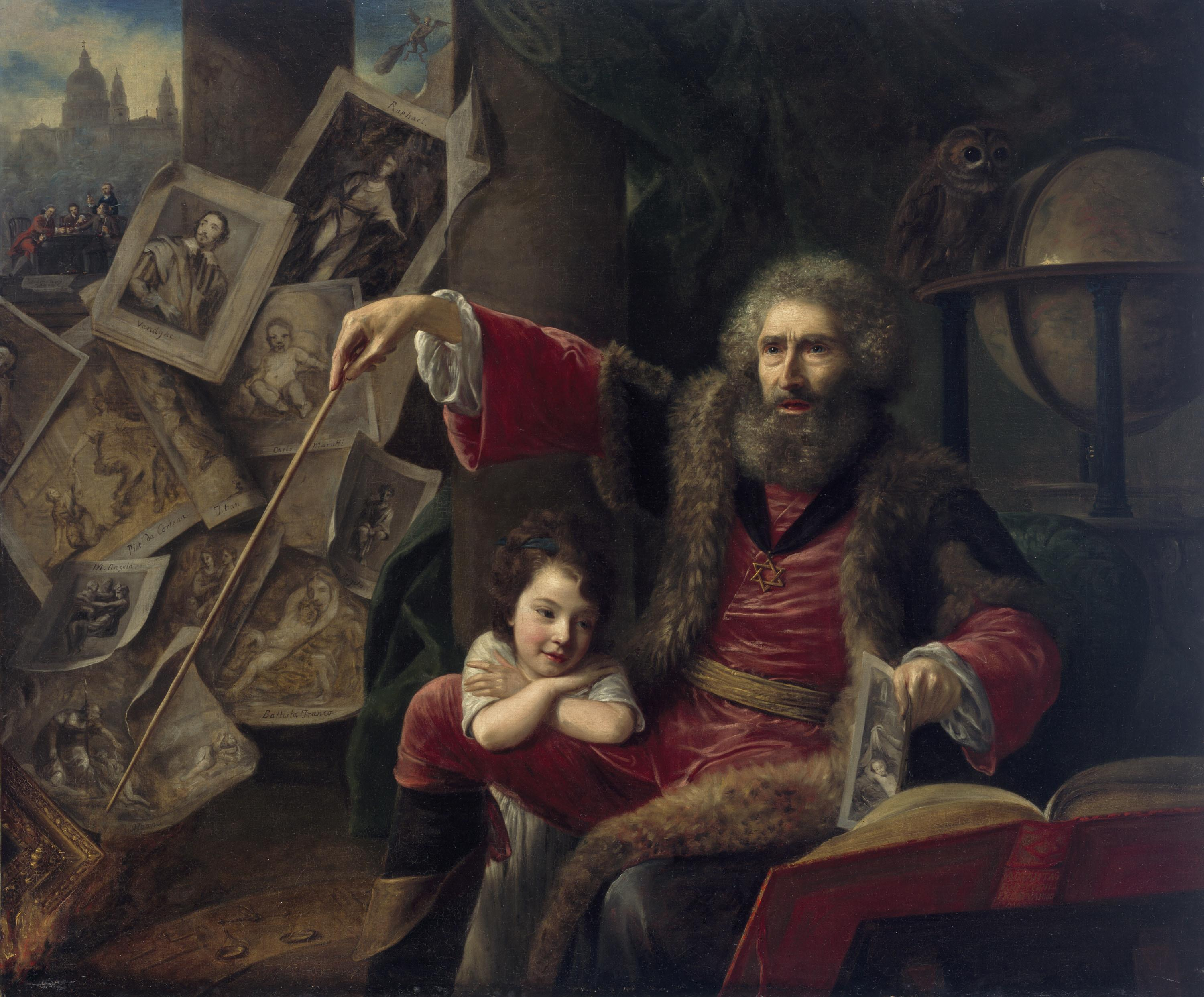
- Original version of painting on which Hone has reworked the offending figures in the background.
- Artist: Nathaniel Hone
- Year: 1775
- Type: Oil on canvas
- Dimensions: 145 cm × 173 cm (57 in × 68 in)
- Location: National Gallery of Ireland, Dublin

The Conjuror is a 1775 oil painting by the Irish artist Nathaniel Hone the Elder. An allegory, it depicts a conjuror or alchemist casting a series of paintings by Old Masters into a fire and drawing a print from them. A bearded magician, he is seated with a young girl leaning against his knee. In the background is St Paul's Cathedral.

Hone submitted the work for the Royal Academy's Annual Exhibition for 1775. Although it was initially accepted by the committee, it attracted controversy when the Swiss artist Angelica Kauffman, one of the female founding members of the academy, protested that one of the naked figures shown dancing in the background was intended to be her.

Kauffman threatened to withdraw her paintings from the exhibition if Hone's was permitted. Hone tried to insist that the figure she was referring to was intended to be a man, but Kauffman was unmoved and the academy chose to reject the painting. Hone repainted the offending figures, turning them into fully-clothed roisterers, but also attempted to capitalise on the controversy by staging a one-man exhibition featuring The Conjuror and other works.

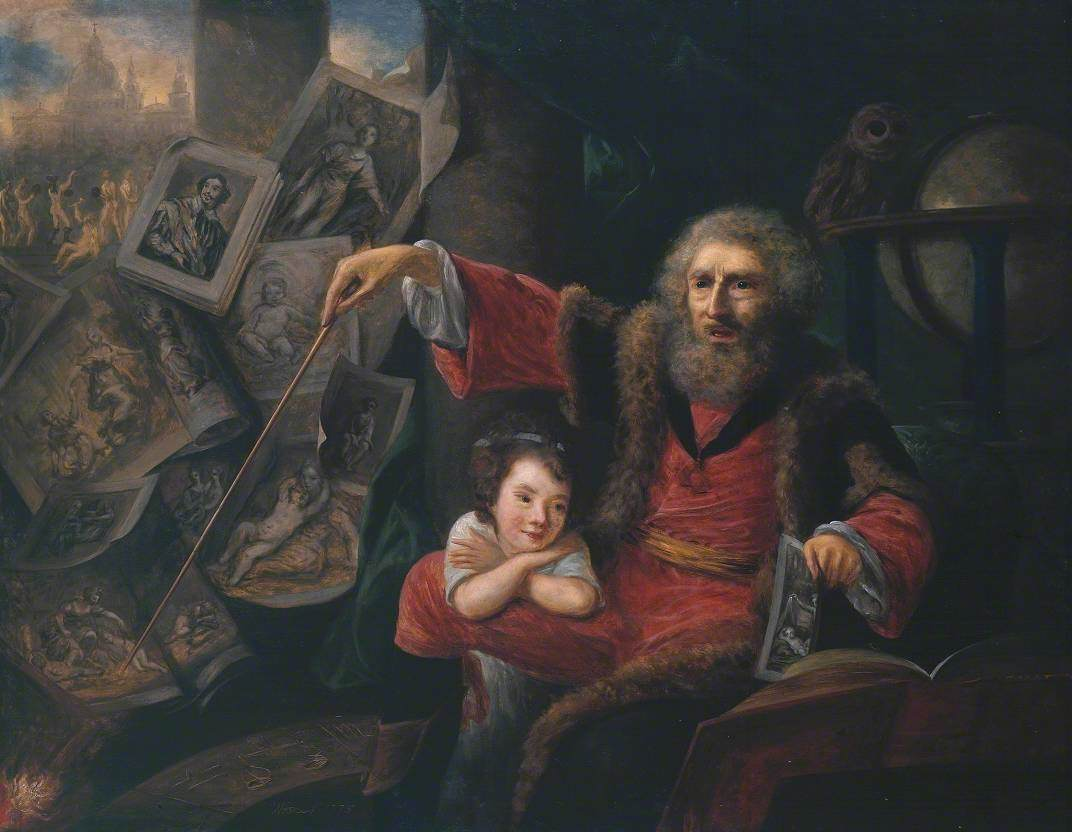
A sketch for the painting featuring the naked figures.

If the painting was intended to mock and attack anyone, it was the President of the Royal Academy Joshua Reynolds rather than Kauffman. The conjuror is clearly meant to be Reynolds, who is shown turning Old Masters into his own inferior work - a reference to Reynolds' tendency to borrow stylistically from great artists of the past. Hone had a long-standing resentment of Reynolds. Kauffman was a friend of Reynolds. It has alternatively been suggested that the little girl in the painting was intended to be Kauffman, with Reynolds leading her astray artistically by showing her how to steal from Old Masters.

The painting remained in Hone's studio until his death in 1784, and was sold for 92 guineas the following year. It is in the collection of the National Gallery of Ireland in Dublin. A sketch, featuring the nude figures in the background, is in the Tate.

== Bibliography ==
- Gaze, Delia (ed.) Concise Dictionary of Women Artists. Taylor & Francis, 2013.
- Hunter, Matthew C. Painting with Fire: Sir Joshua Reynolds, Photography, and the Temporally Evolving Chemical Object. University of Chicago Press, 2019.
- McIntyre, Ian. Joshua Reynolds: The Life and Times of the First President of the Royal Academy. Penguin Books, 2004.
