= Beilstein on the Moselle =

Painting by Clarkson Stanfield

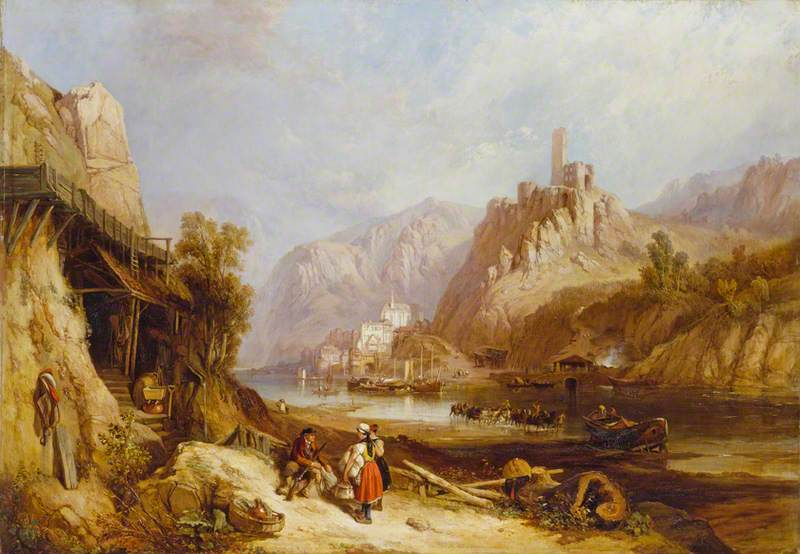
- Artist: Clarkson Stanfield
- Year: 1837
- Medium: Oil on canvas, landscape painting
- Dimensions: 114.3 cm × 163.7 cm (45.0 in × 64.4 in)
- Location: Wallace Collection, London

Beilstein on the Moselle is an 1837 landscape painting by the British artist Clarkson Stanfield. It depicts a view on the River Moselle at the village of Beilstein in the Rhineland. The scene is not far from the city of Koblenz. The ruins of Metternich Castle can be seen on the right. Stanfield, a former sailor turned painter of seascapes, had toured the area in the autumn of the previous year. Metternich Castle was the ancestral home of Klemens von Metternich, the Austrian statesman. In 1855 the artist's son George Clarkson Stanfield produced a view of the same scene in 1855.

The painting was exhibited at the Royal Academy of Arts's Summer Exhibition of 1837. Today it is in the Wallace Collection in London, having been acquired by the Marquess of Hertford in 1863.

== Bibliography ==
- Bury, Stephen (ed.) Benezit Dictionary of British Graphic Artists and Illustrators, Volume 1. OUP, 2012.
- Ingamells, John. The Wallace Collection: British, German, Italian, Spanish. Wallace Collection, 1985.
- Van der Merwe, Pieter & Took, Roger. The Spectacular career of Clarkson Stanfield. Tyne and Wear County Council Museums, 1979.
