= Metternich Castle =

Castle in Germany

Coordinates: 50°06′32″N 7°14′21″E

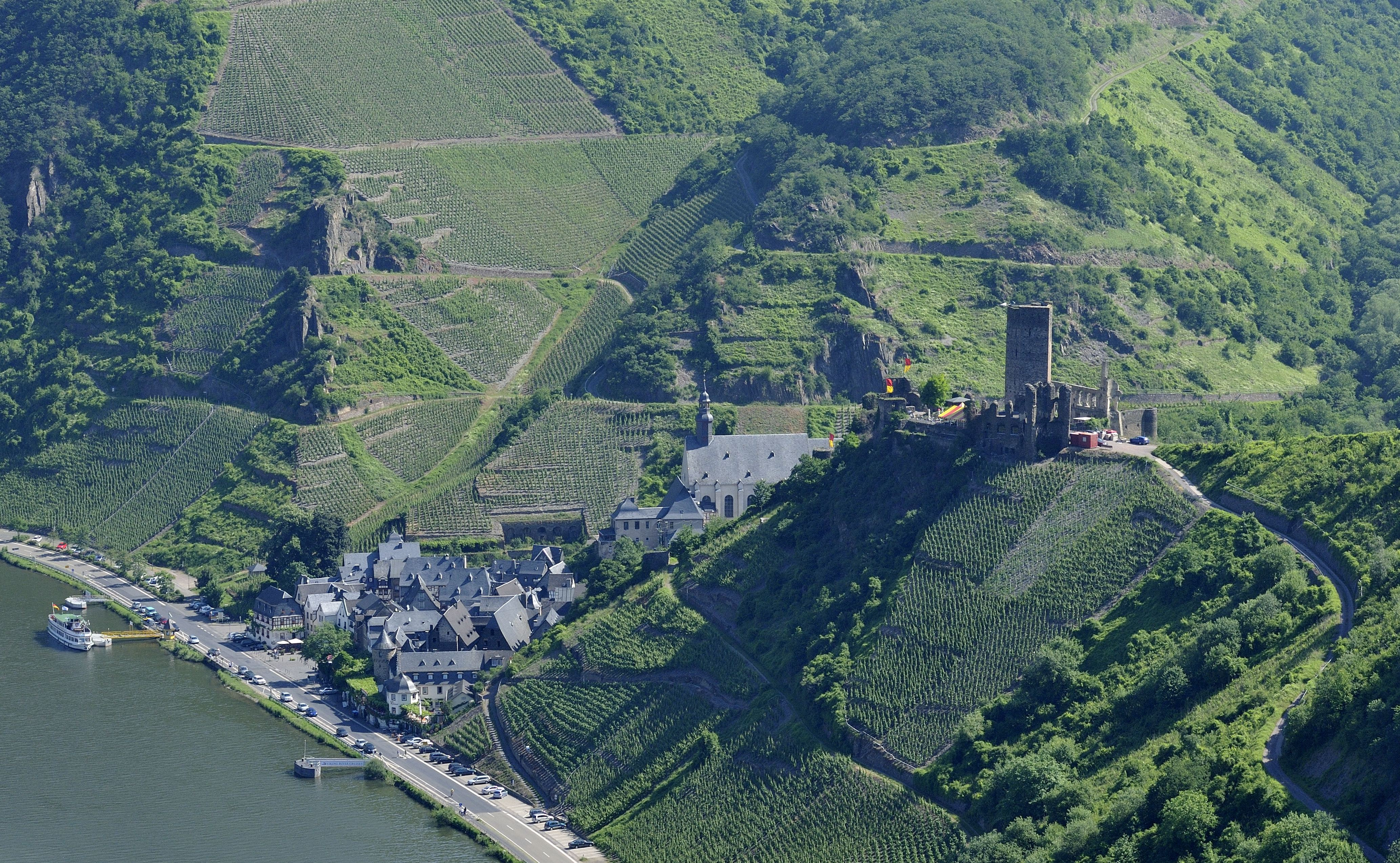
Metternich Castle above the Moselle river

Metternich Castle is an ancient castle in the Rhineland-Palatinate state of the Federal Republic of Germany. It is also known as the Beilstein Castle (Burg Beilstein), being within the municipal bounds of in Beilstein, Rhineland-Palatinate.

== Location ==
The castle, now in ruins, is located in the municipality of Beilstein on the river Moselle.

== History ==
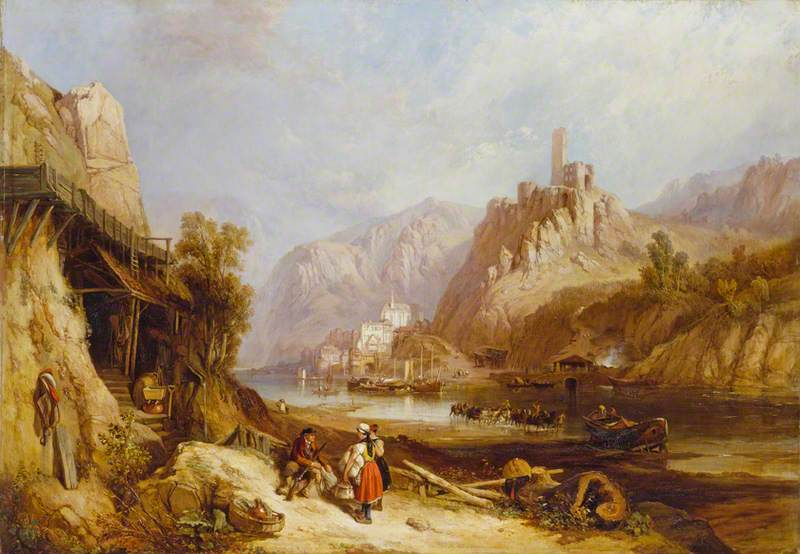
Beilstein on the Moselle by Clarkson Stanfield, 1837. The ruins of the castle are visible on the right.

The history of the castle goes back to 1268 when the castle (referred to as Bilstein Castle) was first mentioned. It is thought the castle is even older, with some historians indicating 1129 as the year of construction.

Until the first half of 17th century, the castle was owned by Counts von Nassau-Dillenburg. In 1637, the castle became the property of the House of Metternich, hence its current name, Metternich Castle. The last member of the family to own the castle was Klemens von Metternich, one of the most famous diplomats of the Austrian Empire – he was foreign minister from 1809 to 1848.

In 1689, during the Nine Years' War, the castle was destroyed by French troops.
