= Beilstein, Rhineland-Palatinate =

Beilstein
- Municipality
- Coat of arms

- Location of Beilstein within Cochem-Zell district
- Interactive map of Beilstein
- Location within Germany Location within Rhineland-Palatinate
- Coordinates: 50°6′37″N 7°14′22″E
- Country: Germany
- State: Rhineland-Palatinate
- District: Cochem-Zell
- Municipal assoc.: Cochem

Government
  - Mayor (2019–24): Eugen Herrmann

Area
  - Total: 1.68 km^{2} (0.65 sq mi)
- Elevation: 90 m (300 ft)

Population (2025-12-31)
  - Total: 132
  - Density: 78.6/km^{2} (203/sq mi)
- Time zone: UTC+01:00 (CET)
  - Summer (DST): UTC+02:00 (CEST)
- Postal codes: 56814
- Dialling codes: 02673
- Vehicle registration: COC / ZEL
- Website: www.beilstein-mosel.de

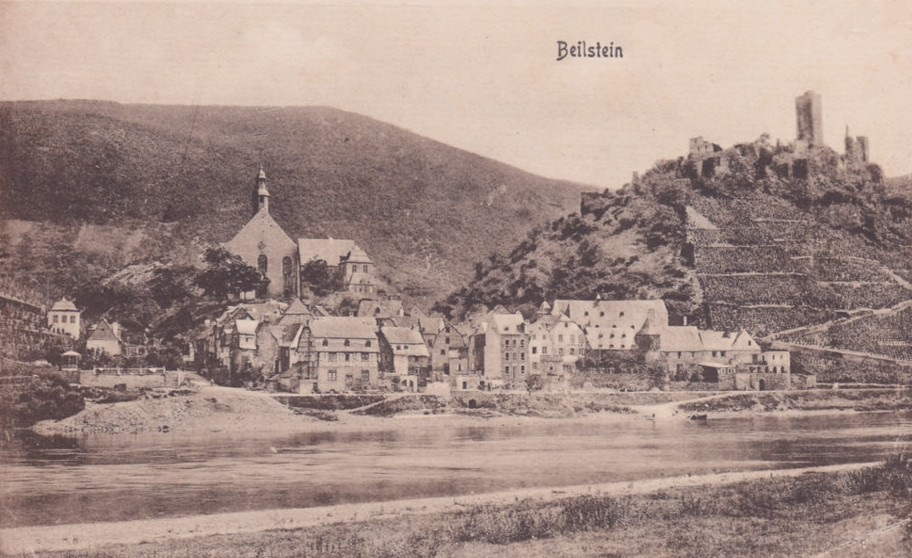
Beilstein c. 1900

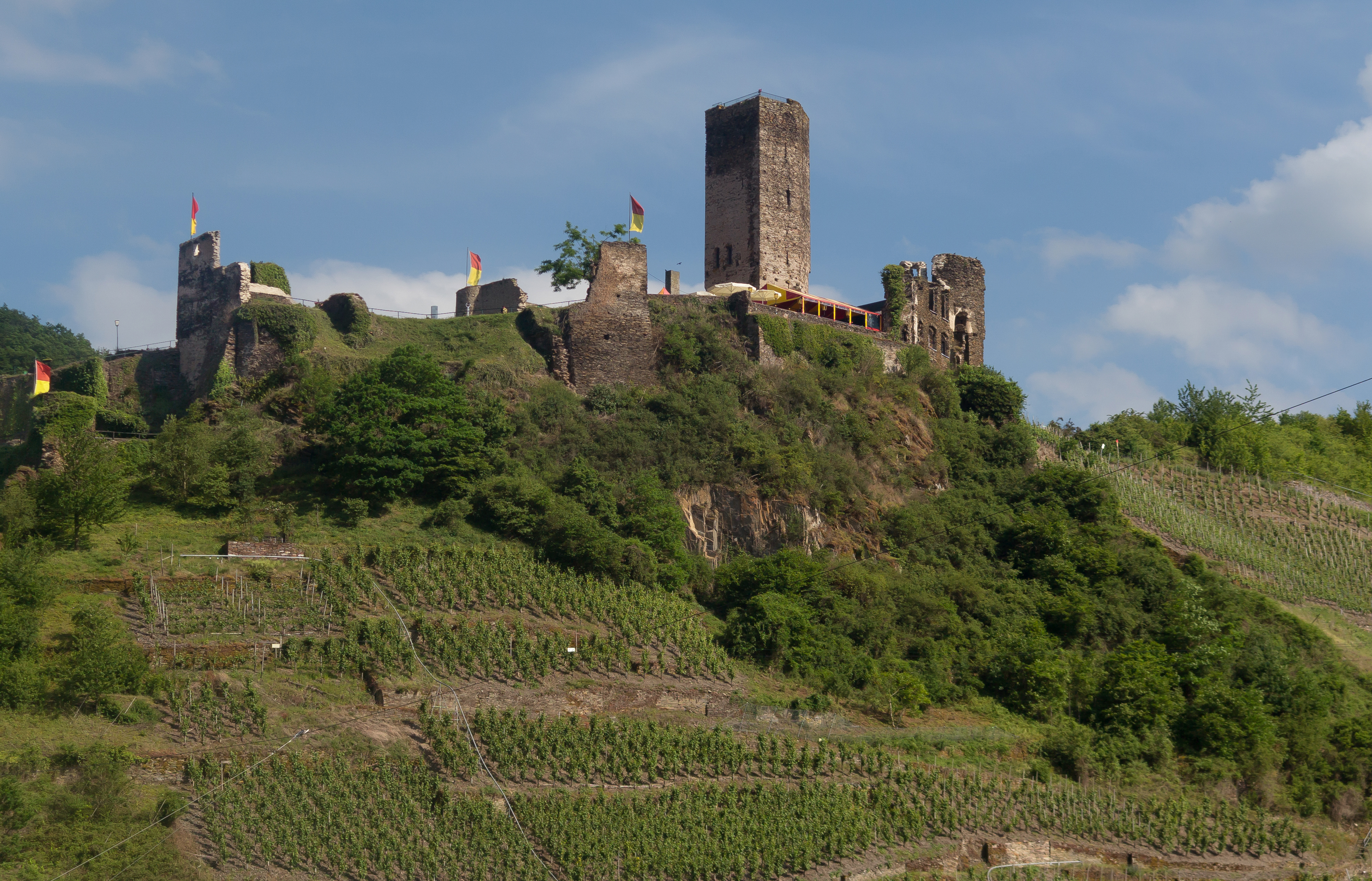
Ruin castle Metternich

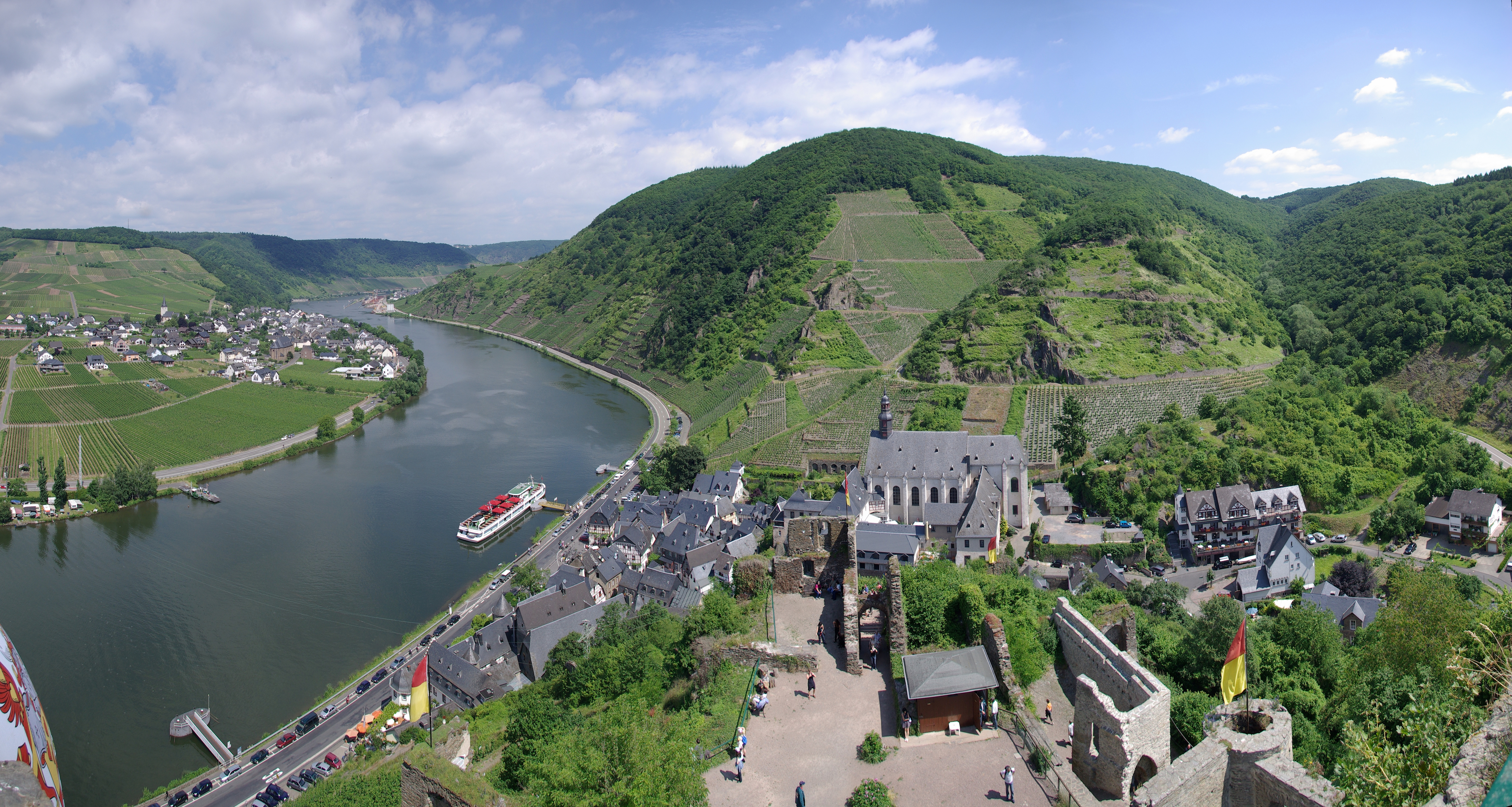
Beilstein seen from the tower at Castle Metternich

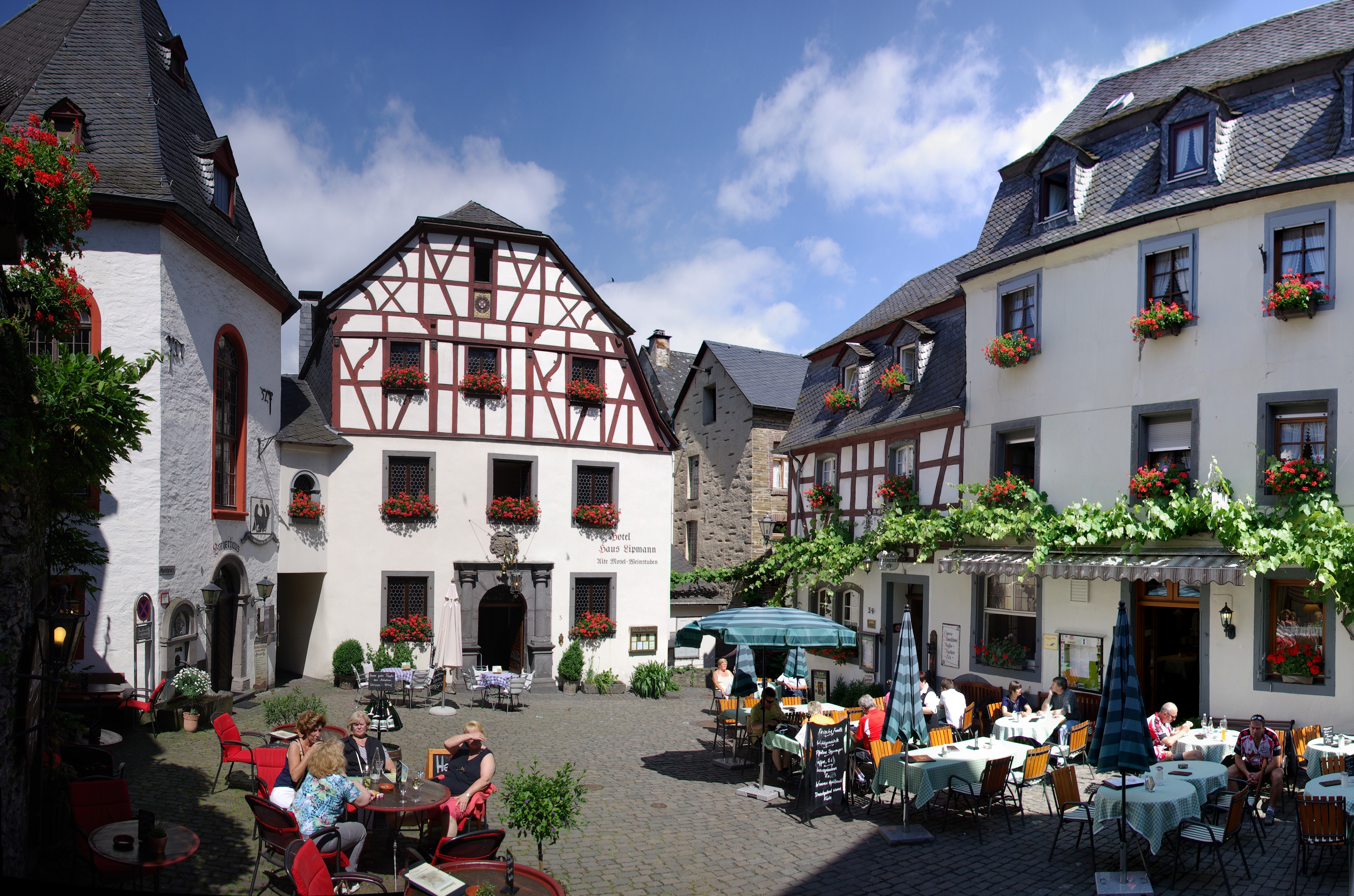
Marketplace

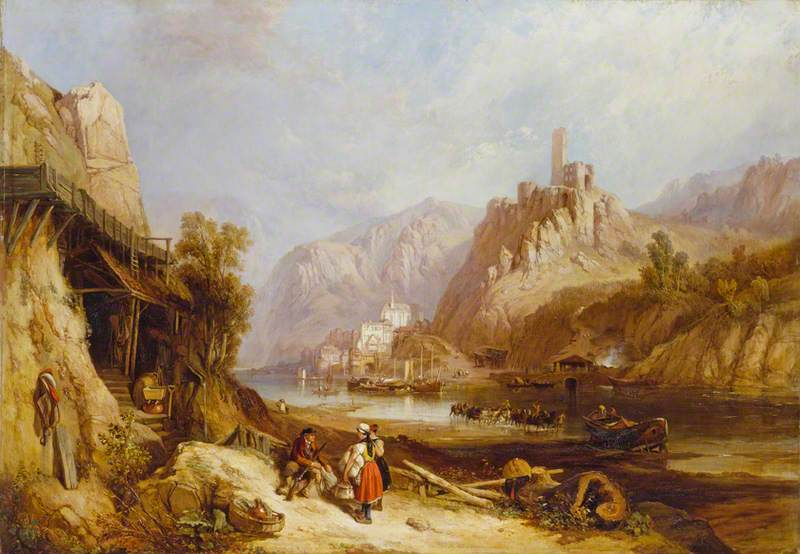
Beilstein on the Moselle by Clarkson Stanfield, 1837

Beilstein (German pronunciation: [ˈbaɪlʃtaɪn]) is an Ortsgemeinde – a municipality belonging to a Verbandsgemeinde, a kind of collective municipality – in the Cochem-Zell district in Rhineland-Palatinate, Germany. It belongs to the Verbandsgemeinde of Cochem, whose seat is in the like-named town.

== Geography ==
=== Location ===
The municipality lies on the river Moselle.

== History ==
Finds from Frankish graves show that Beilstein was settled about AD 800. Beginning in 1268, the village was a fief held by the Lords of Braunshorn. Under Johann von Braunshorn (1299–1346), Beilstein was granted town privileges in 1309 by Heinrich VII and was fortified. In 1309, a Jewish community was founded, whose graveyard up above the castle still exists today. In 1310 the former parish church was endowed. After the family von Braunshorn died out, the fief passed in 1360 to the family von Winneburg. After the Electorate of Trier took over ownership of Beilstein in 1488, it enfeoffed the Imperial Counts of Metternich with the Lordship of Winneburg and Beilstein. In 1689 came the destruction of Castle Metternich (known as Die stolze Gemäuer, or "The Proud Walling") by French troops. The Carmelite monastery was founded in 1636 (and dissolved in 1803). In 1691, the Carmelite monastery church's foundation stones were laid; the church was completed in 1783. In the 17th and 18th centuries, the village's appearance took on the shape that it still largely retains today. The Metternich lordship was swept away in 1794 when French Revolutionary troops occupied the region. In 1815 Beilstein was assigned to the Kingdom of Prussia at the Congress of Vienna. Since 1946, it has been part of the then newly founded state of Rhineland-Palatinate.

== Politics ==
=== Municipal council ===
The council is made up of 6 council members, who were elected by majority vote at the municipal election held on 7 June 2009, and the honorary mayor as chairman.

=== Mayor ===
Beilstein's mayor is Eugen Herrmann.

=== Coat of arms ===
Beilstein's old arms, adopted in 1951, were the arms formerly borne by the Lords of Braunshorn. In English heraldic language they might be described thus: Gules a bugle-horn argent stringed Or. The single charge in these arms has been incorporated into the new arms, designed by A. Friderichs, albeit with the string in the same tincture as the horn itself. These newer arms might be described thus: Quarterly, first Or a bend dancetty gules, second sable an escallop argent, third gules a bugle-horn of the fourth and fourth argent a cross quartered of the second.

Old arms

New arms

== Culture and sightseeing ==
=== Sightseeing ===
The small village has one of the best preserved historical appearances on the Moselle and is thus also sometimes known as a miniature Rothenburg ob der Tauber or Dornröschen der Mosel ("Sleeping Beauty of the Moselle"). Towering above the village, which despite its small size is built to look much like a town, are the ruins of Metternich Castle, which once belonged to the like-named noble family.

The village is a pilgrimage site, for it is here that the "Miraculous Black Madonna" is displayed in the Baroque Saint Joseph's Monastery Church. This is a statue of Spanish origin from the 12th or 13th century, left behind by the Spaniards after their short time as Beilstein's lords after the Thirty Years' War and shortly thereafter taken to France, only to be brought back to Beilstein in 1950.

The organ in the monastery church was built by Balthasar König from Münstereifel/Cologne in 1738. Restoration work in 2002 gave the instrument back its original sound and character.

Each year in July and August, the Beilsteiner Märchensommer ("Beilstein Fairy-Tale Summer") is held, at which the marionette theatre from Cochem produces fairy tales at the winegrowing museum. Always opening and closing the series of events is a traditional version of the Brothers Grimm’s "Sleeping Beauty", in keeping with one of the village's nicknames.

=== Buildings ===
The following are listed buildings or sites in Rhineland-Palatinate’s Directory of Cultural Monuments:

- Castle Metternich ruins (monumental zone) – mentioned in 1268, destroyed in 1689; keep from about 1200, southwest round tower from the 14th century, basement of a building wing; parts of a residential building and side buildings, outer bailey with round tower, wall with the town, outer gate, ringwall and bailey.
- Saint Joseph’s Catholic Parish Church (Pfarrkirche St. Joseph) and Carmelite monastery (monumental zone) – three-naved hall church, begun 1691, bears year 1738, design by Friar Franz Wynant, Springiersbach Monastery, whole building complex with monastery buildings, graveyard and walled monastery area, monastery buildings/rectory: plastered buildings from 1686-1692 and 1687 respectively, latter with cellar portal; Klostertreppe 56: Baroque pavilion; in the graveyard three grave crosses, 1663, 18th century, 19th century, Gothic Revival grave cross, 1887.
- Fortifications – begun in the early 14th century, originally tied in with the castle, with 5 gates and with towers; two round towers preserved: at the southwest corner (Moselstraße 3/4) and the northwest corner (Alte Wehrstraße 19); two overbuilt gates (Alte Wehrstraße and Bachstraße 19).
- Village centre, Alte Wehrstraße, Auf dem Teich, Bachstraße, Fürst-Metternich-Straße, Klosterstraße, marketplace, Moselstraße, Schloßstraße, Weingasse (monumental zone) – historical village structure with remnants of the old fortifications down to the Moselle waterfront, including a vineyard pavilion in the north, a former school in the east and castle ruins in the south.
- Alte Wehrstraße – town wall gate, on top of which a quarrystone house.
- Alte Wehrstraße 19 – building with mansard roof and tower stump with timber-frame structure built on top, essentially late mediaeval; converted in the 18th century.
- At Alte Wehrstraße 22 – Baroque vineyard pavilion, 18th century, whole complex with quarrystone house, 19th century, garden and pavilion.
- Bachstraße 8 – building with mansard roof, partly timber-frame, 18th century.
- Bachstraße 32 – three-floor timber-frame house, partly solid, 18th century.
- At Bachstraße 39 – town wall gateway arch.
- Bachstraße 50 – building with mansard roof, partly timber-frame, 18th century.
- Fürst-Metternich-Straße 28 – building with half-hipped roof, partly timber-frame, from 1757.
- Fürst-Metternich-Straße 37 – Haus Sausen, three-floor building with half-hipped roof, partly timber-frame, slated, from 1726.
- Im Mühlental 17 – building with half-hipped roof, partly timber-frame, from about 1800.
- Klostertreppe 29 – building with mansard roof, partly timber-frame, from 1757.
- Klostertreppe 30 – Haus Ekartz, three-floor building with half-hipped roof, partly timber-frame, slated, from 1714.
- Klostertreppe 31 – building with half-hipped roof, partly timber-frame, from 1726.
- Klostertreppe 39 – timber-frame house, partly solid, marked 1747, 1761 and 1826.
- Marktplatz (marketplace) – tithe house, quarrystone building with polygonal staircase and half-hipped roof, 1537, conversion 1759.
- Marktplatz 1 – former Saint Christopher’s Catholic Parish Church, so-called "Old School", aisleless church from 1732 with parts of the building from the 16th century, portal with year 1578, fountain 19th century.
- Marktplatz 3 – former Metternich estate, three-floor building with hipped mansard roof, partly timber-frame, from 1727 and 1770.
- Marktplatz 34 – building with mansard roof, partly timber-frame, from the 18th century, cast-iron pump from the 19th century.
- Marktplatz 35 – three-floor plastered building with timber-frame top floor, about 1800.
- Moselstraße (no number) – old tollhouse with hipped mansard roof, partly timber-frame, formerly bore year 1634, conversion (?) in 18th or early 19th century.
- Moselstraße 1 – inn Zur Burg ("At the Castle"), building with mansard roof, crow-stepped gable; tower with tent roof from old fortifications, Baroque addition.
- Moselstraße 2a – building with mansard roof, from the 18th century.
- Moselstraße 2 – former Amtshaus, solid building, partly with twinned windows, 17th/18th century (?).
- Moselstraße 3/4 – no. 3: plastered building, possibly essentially late mediaeval, made over in Baroque, 18th century; no. 4: building with mansard roof, from the 18th century.
- Schloßstraße – wayside chapel, open chapel, 17th century, Baroque stone Madonna.
- Schloßstraße 37 – three-floor quarrystone building, 18th century.
- Schloßstraße 38 – quarrystone building, 19th century.
- At Schloßstraße 56 – Classicist door leaf, earlier half of the 19th century.
- At Weingasse 10 – back wall part of wall-gable combination, Gothic windows, possibly essentially 15th/16th century.
- Weingasse 12 – former synagogue, three-floor quarrystone building, 18th/19th century.
- Weingasse 13 – three-floor building with mansard roof, partly timber-frame, 18th/19th century.
- Jewish graveyard, on the south ridge of the castle mountain above the Moselle – opened in the 17th century, 104 stele-type gravestones.
- Chapel, above the castle near the Jewish graveyard – aisleless church, 1652, before the chapel two crosses, 18th/19th century and 1942 respectively; in the vineyard wall two sandstone reliefs.

=== Beilstein in film ===
The municipality has been the setting in a number of German films, such as the 1958 film version of Der Schinderhannes, about the well known outlaw starring Curd Jürgens, Nazi filmmaker Carl Froelich’s 1936 work Wenn wir alle Engel wären ("If We Were All Angels") starring Heinz Rühmann and the 1938 film Das Verlegenheitskind starring Ida Wüst and Paul Klinger.

== Famous people ==
=== Honorary citizens ===
- Isaac Asir ha-Tikvah, or Isaac of Beilstein (a thirteenth century rabbi, later of Heidelberg).
- Journalist and author Walter Henkels (1906–1987) was awarded honorary citizenship on 4 September 1981.

== Gallery ==
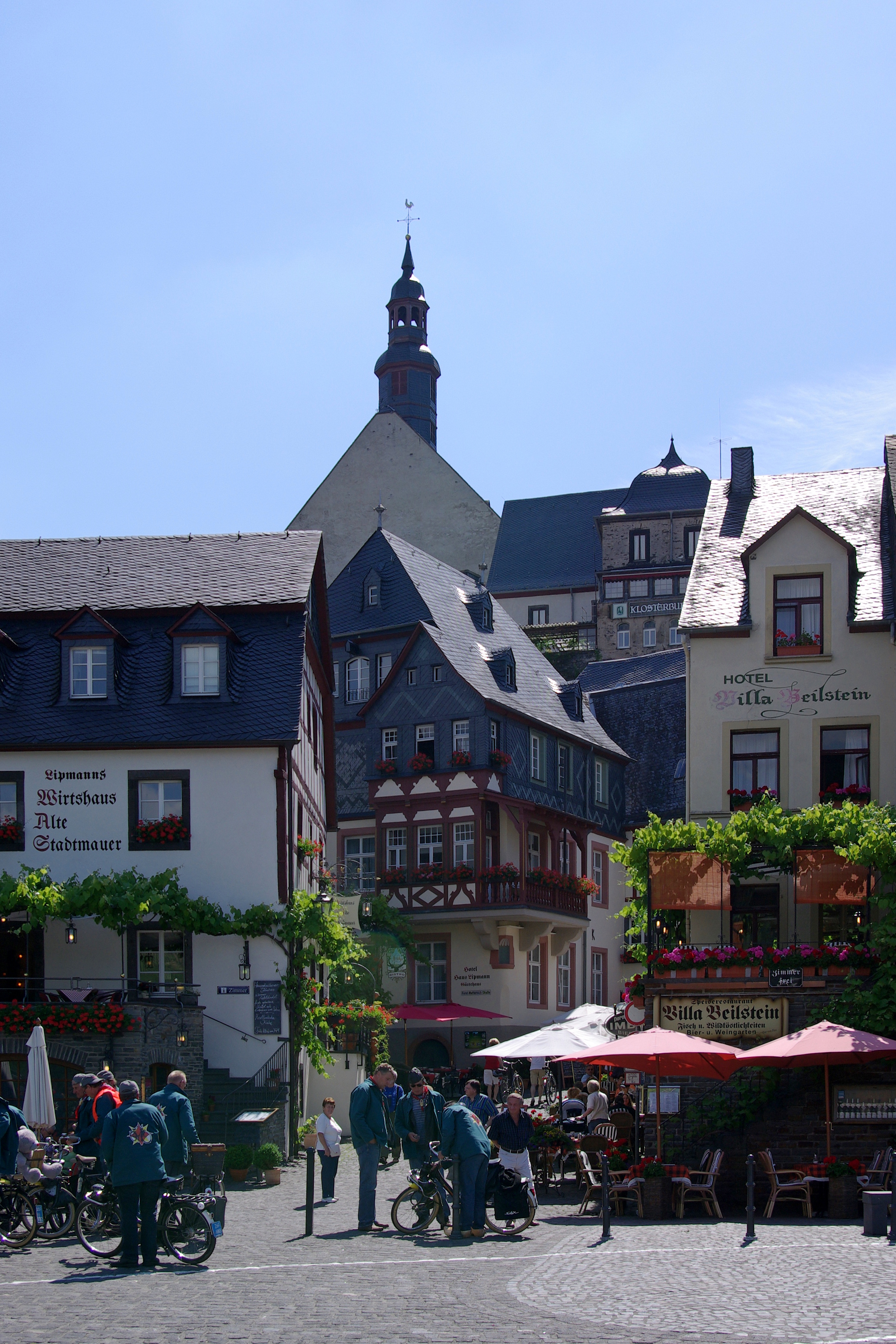
Way into the village on the Moselle

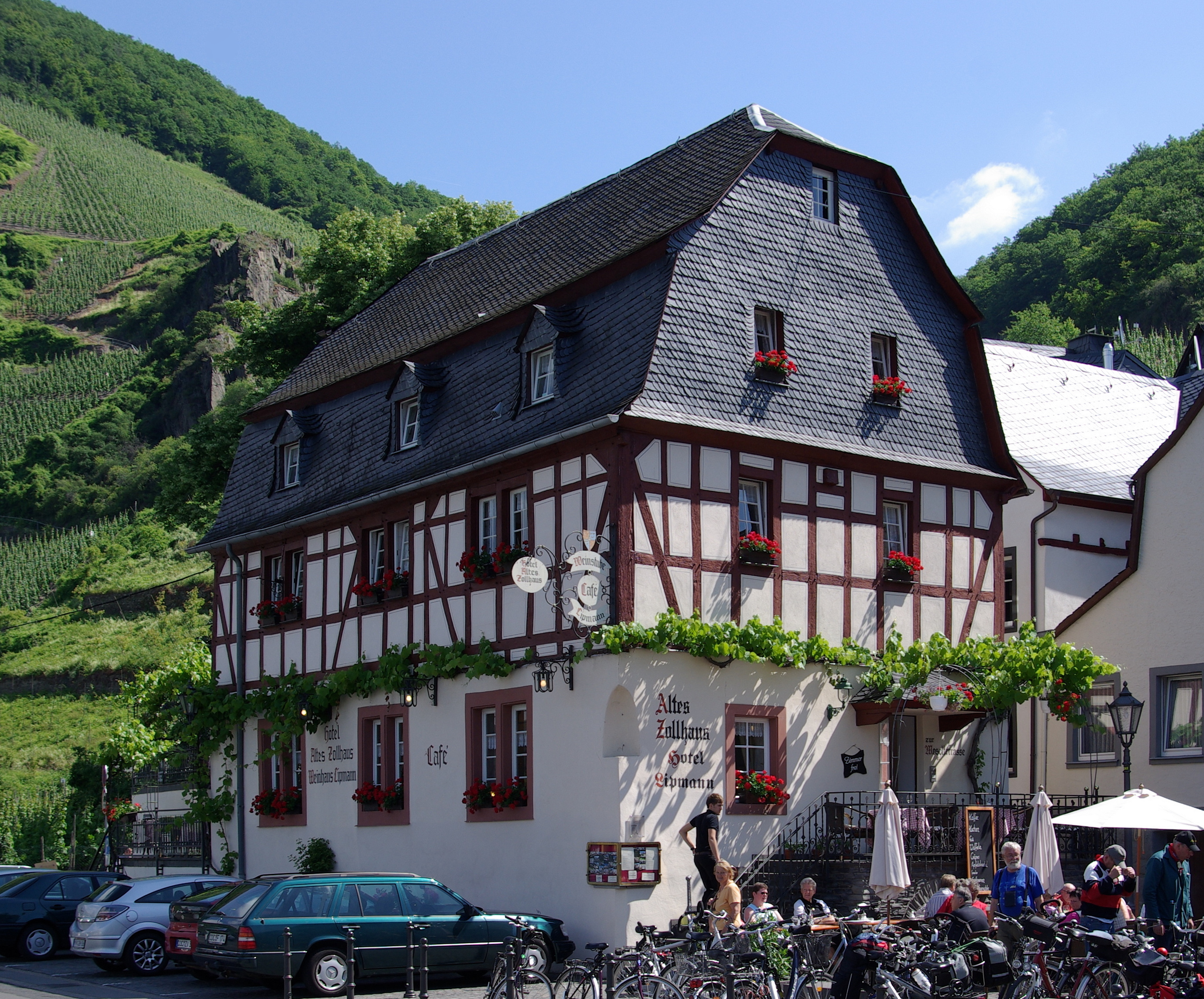
Old tollhouse

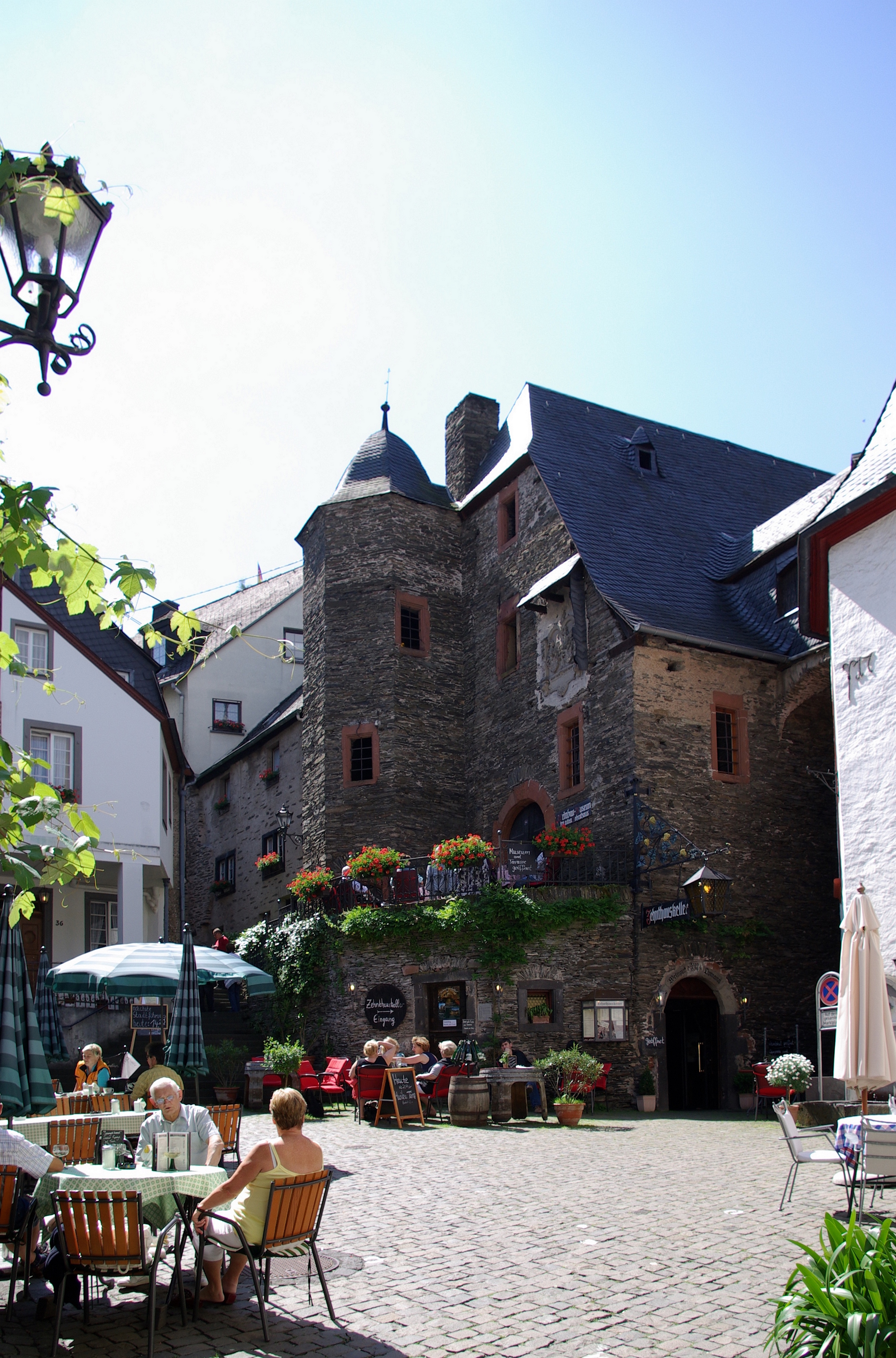
Tithe house

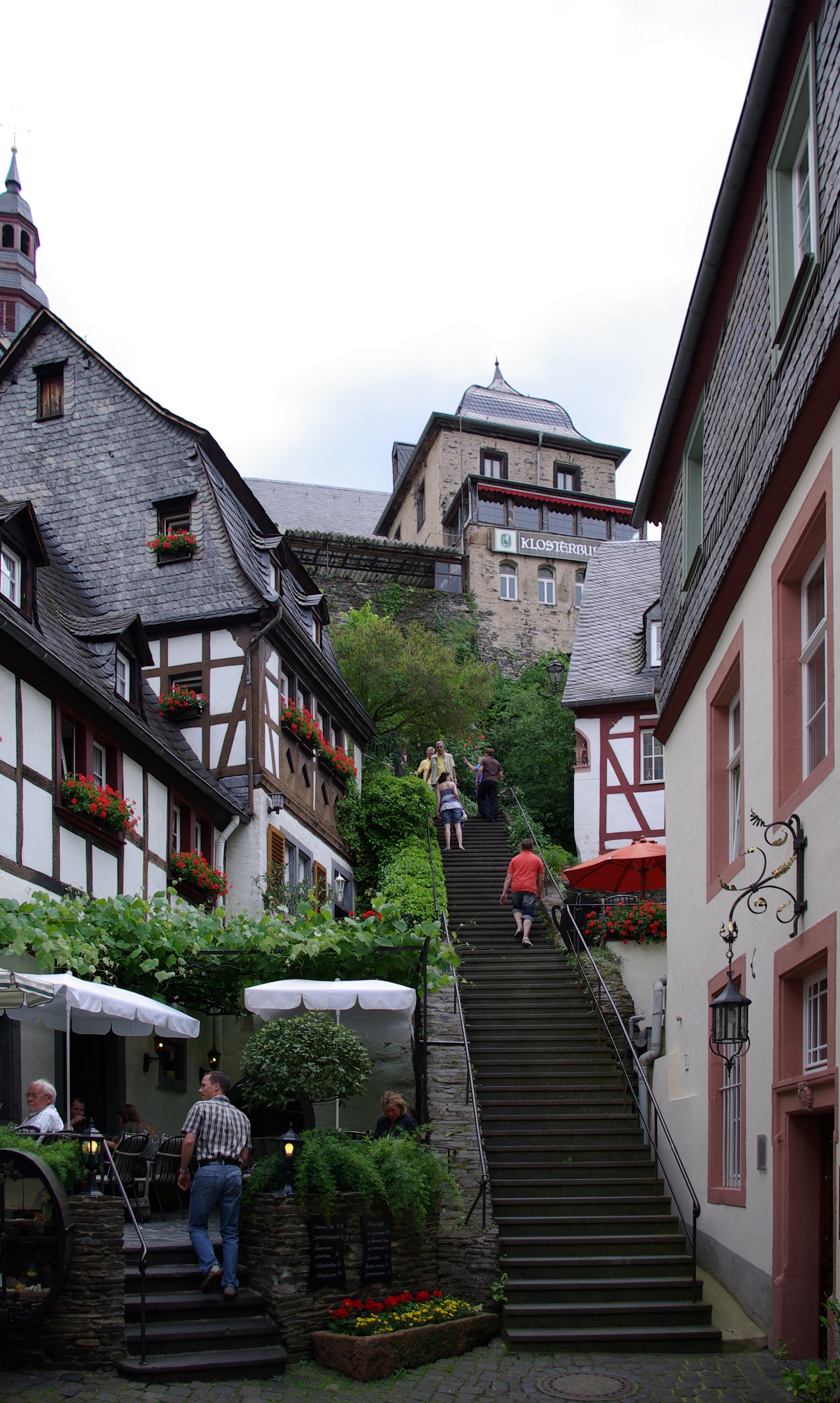
Klostertreppe

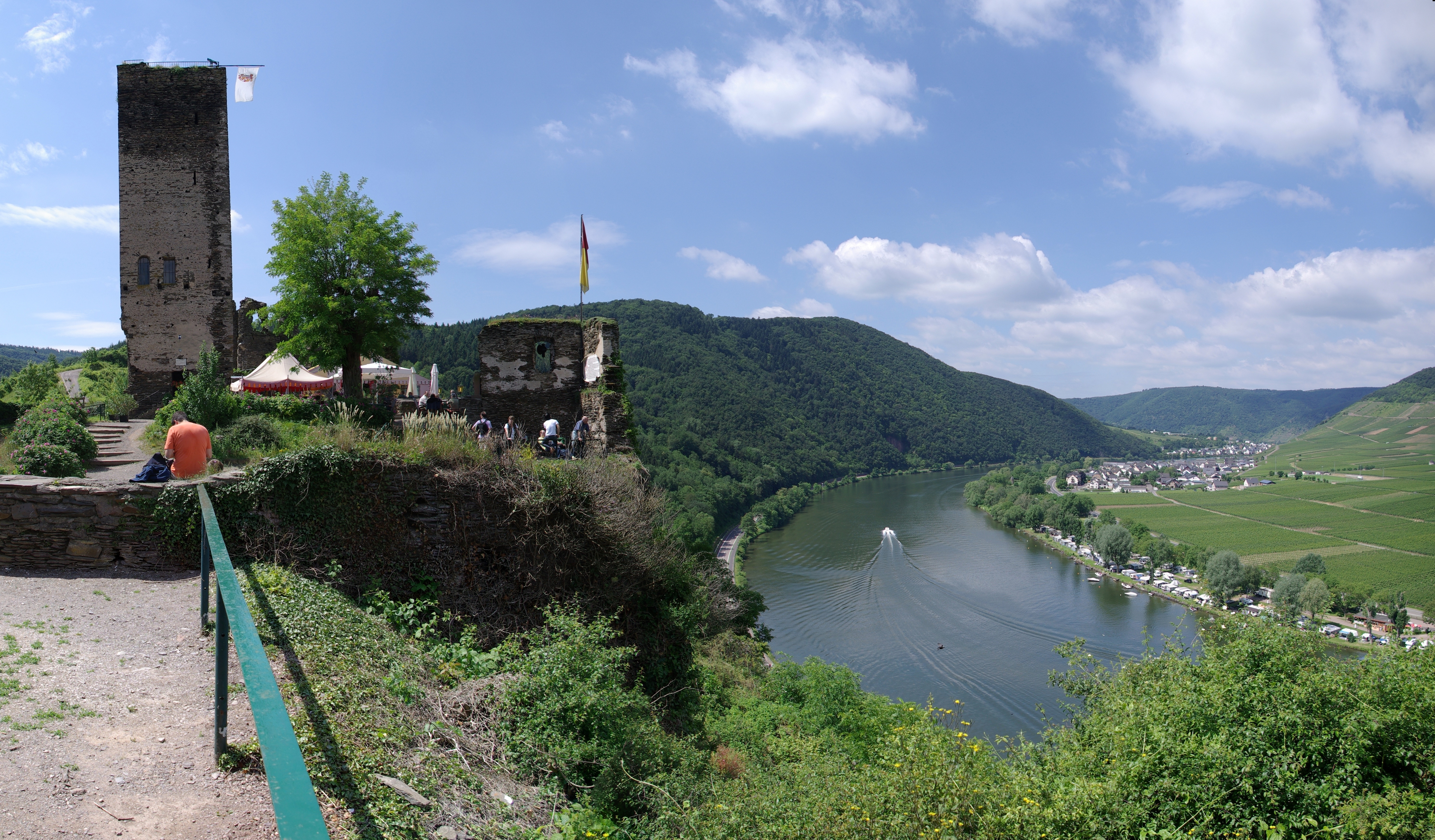
Castle Metternich ruins

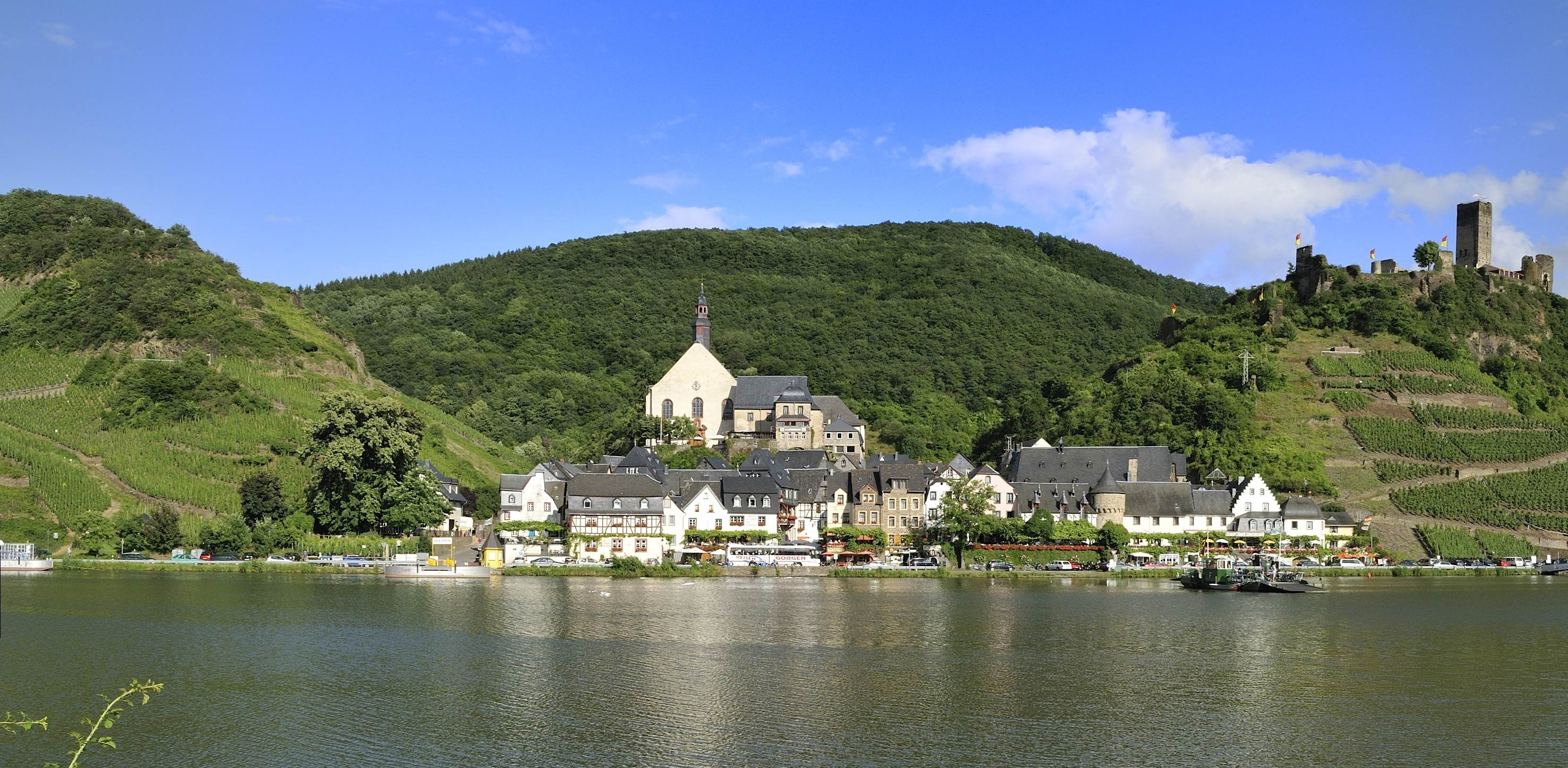
View from the Moselle's left bank of Beilstein and the Castle Metternich ruins

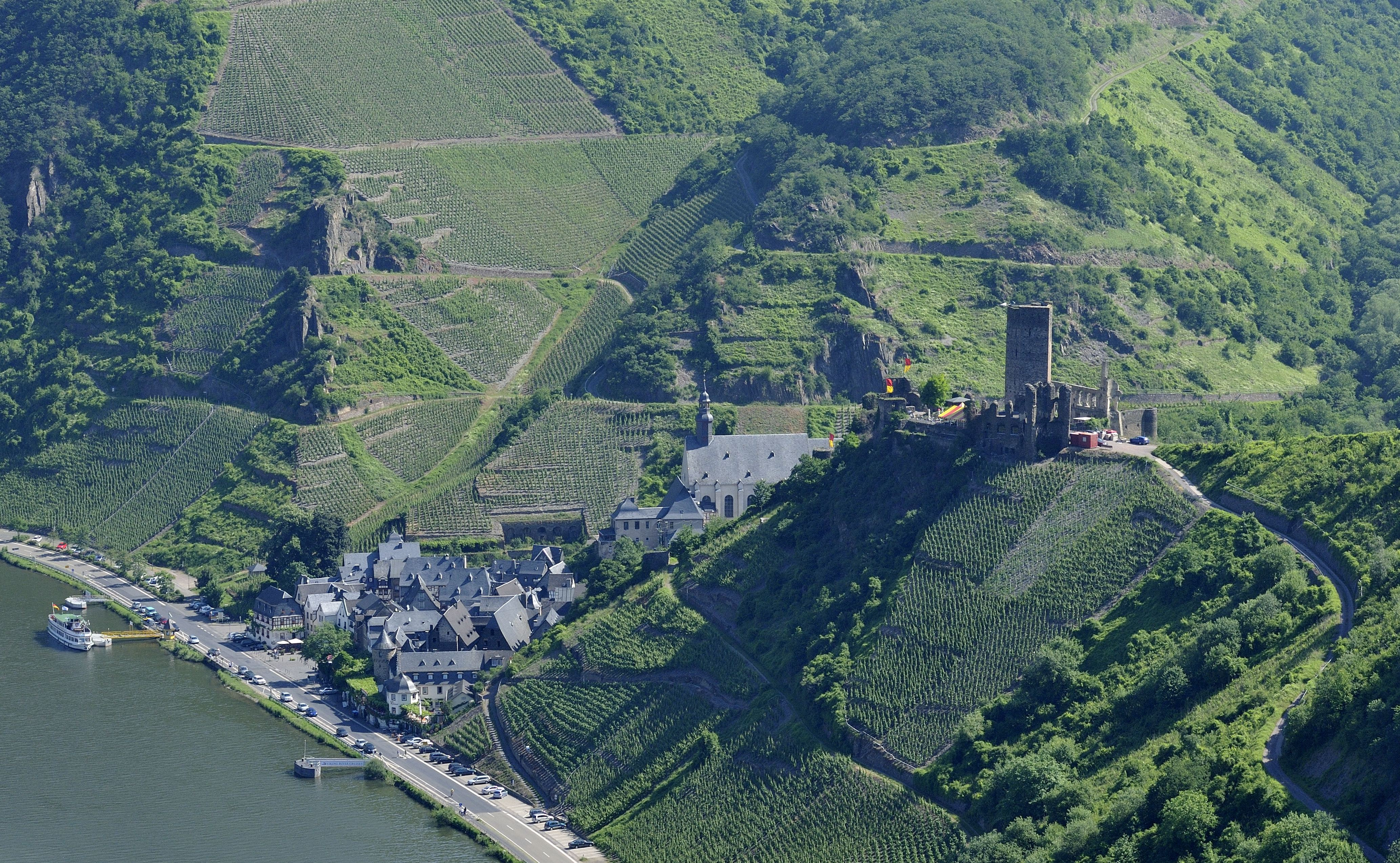
Beilstein with Castle Metternich ruins – view from Waldeslust Briedern

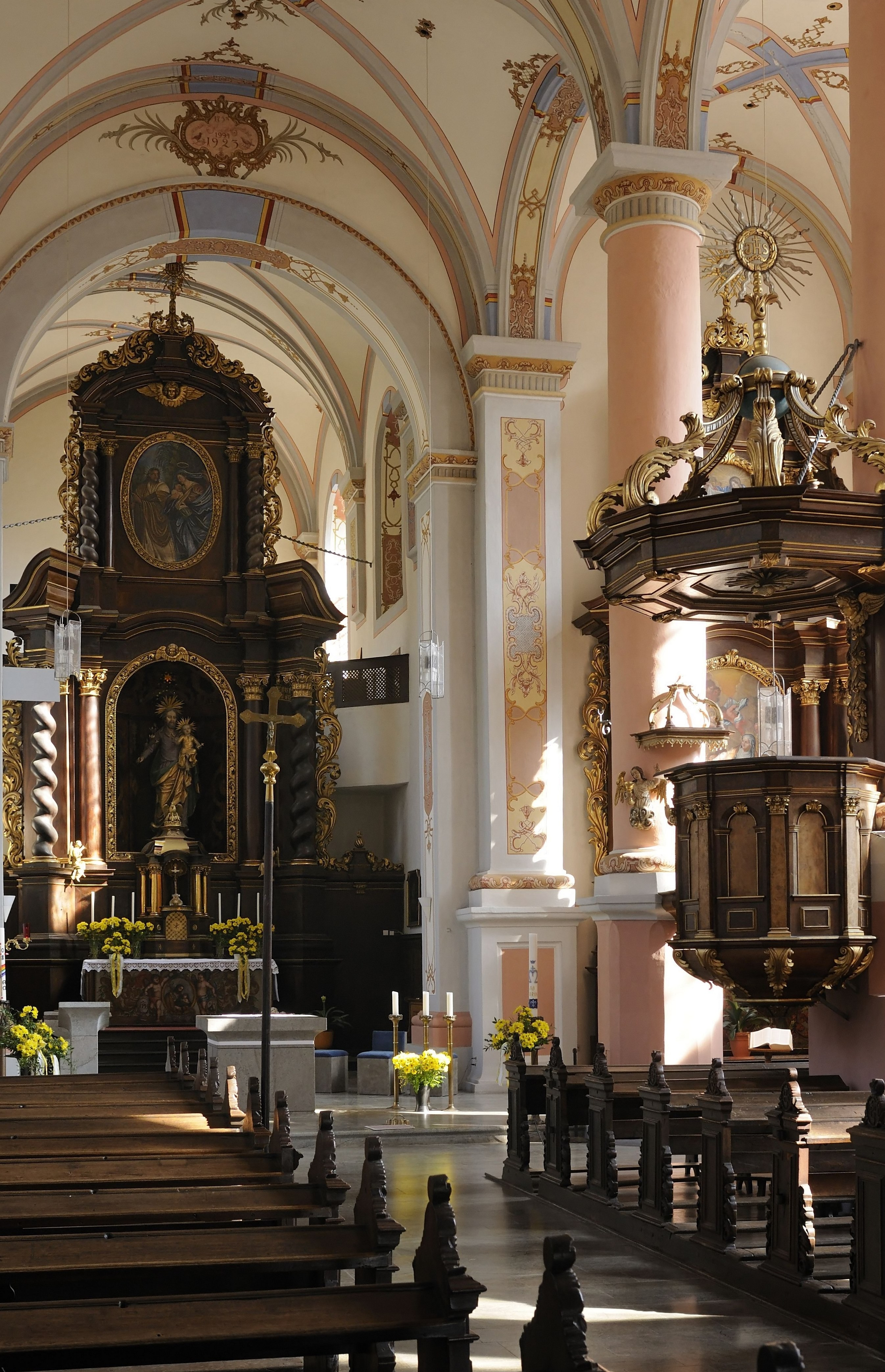
Saint Joseph’s - view of the altar and pulpit

== See also ==
- County of Beilstein
