= George Clarkson Stanfield =

British artist (1828–78)

- Born: 1 May 1828; London, England
- Died: 22 March 1878 (aged 49); Hampstead, London, England
- Education: Royal Academy
- Known for: Landscape art; Marine art
- Spouse: Maria Blackburn
- Children: 7
- Relatives: James Field Stanfield (grandfather); Clarkson Stanfield (father); Francis Stanfield (brother)

George Clarkson Stanfield (1 May 1828 – 22 March 1878) was an English painter best known for his topographical views painted during his visits to the Rhine Valley, Switzerland, and the Italian lakes. He was the son of the marine painter Clarkson Frederick Stanfield.

== Biography ==
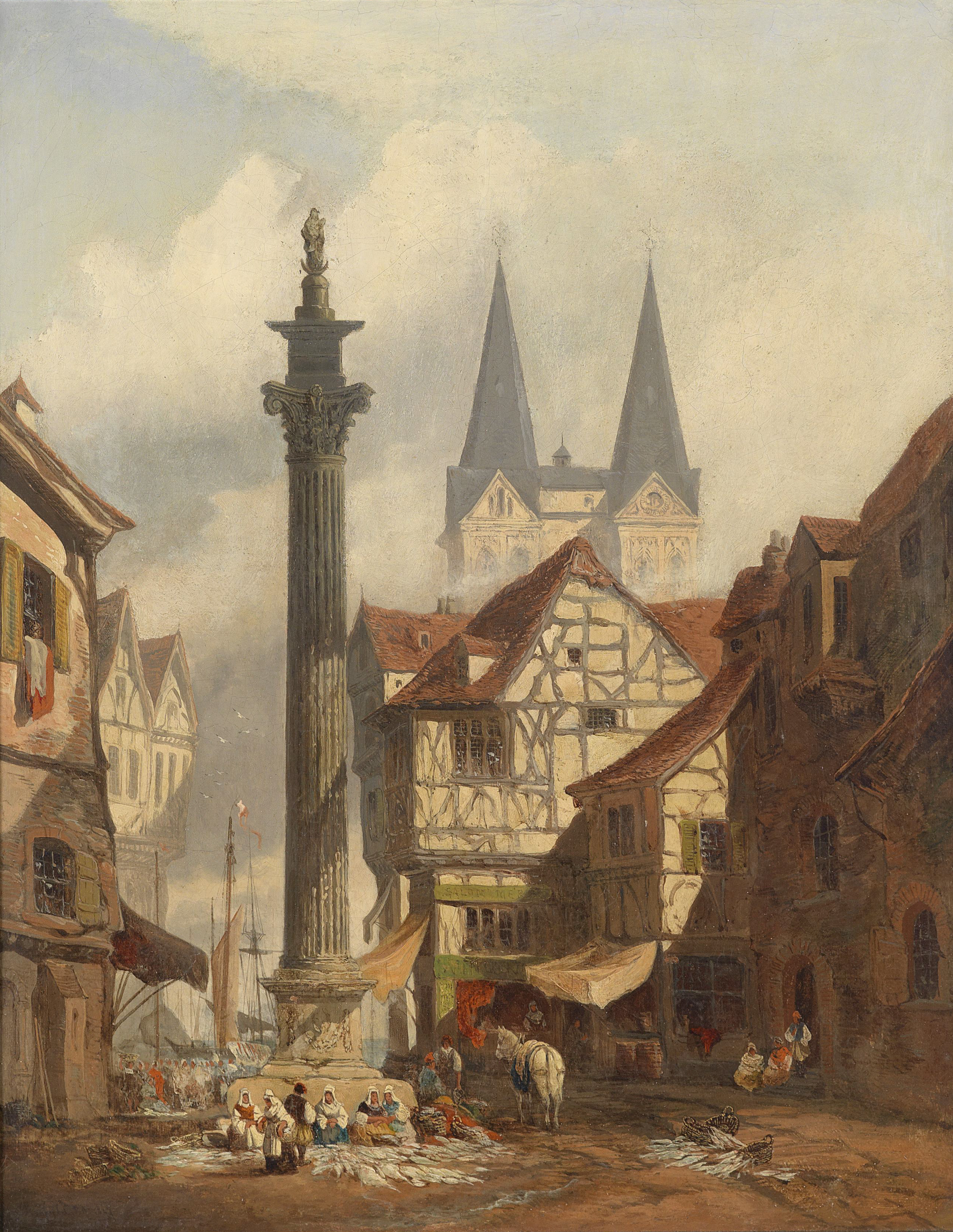
Cityscape (1847)

Stanfield was born in London, the second son from the second marriage of his painter father Clarkson Frederick Stanfield (1793–1867). He received his artistic training largely from his father, and painted the same class of subjects including landscape art and marine art. He attended the Royal Academy Schools, but was not formally enrolled.

He is best known for his topographical views painted during his visits to the Rhine Valley, the Moselle, Switzerland, and the Italian lakes.

Stanfield exhibited, starting at age sixteen, at the Royal Academy from 1844 to 1876 (a total of 49 works) and at the British Institution from 1844 to 1867 (a total of 73 works). He had a limited success during his lifetime, probably due to a shift in taste of the public.

== Family ==
Stanfield married his cousin, Maria Blackburn, in 1854 and took up residence in Hampstead. They had five sons and two daughters. He died of liver disease at the home of his sister in Hampstead, north London, on 22 March 1878.

== Gallery ==
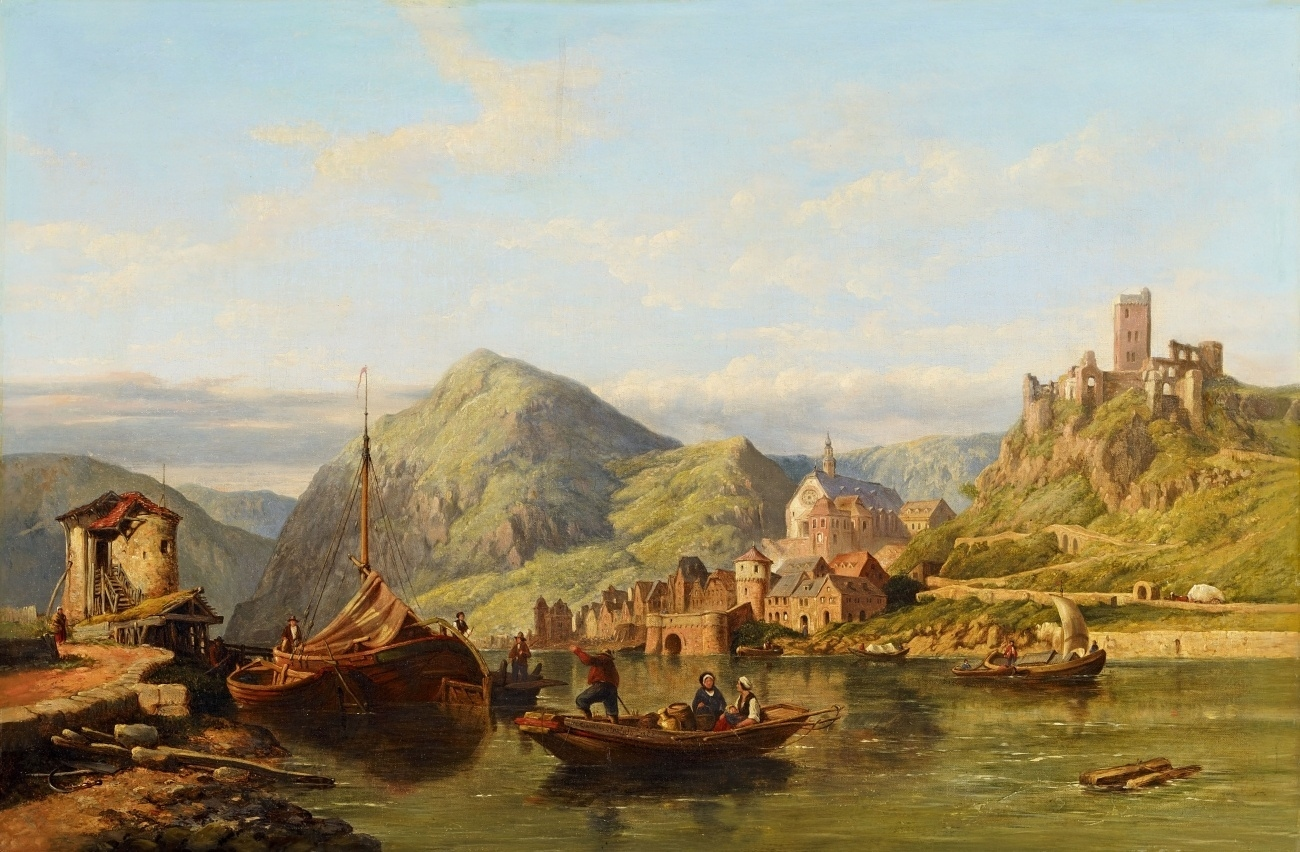
Beilstein on the Moselle (1855)

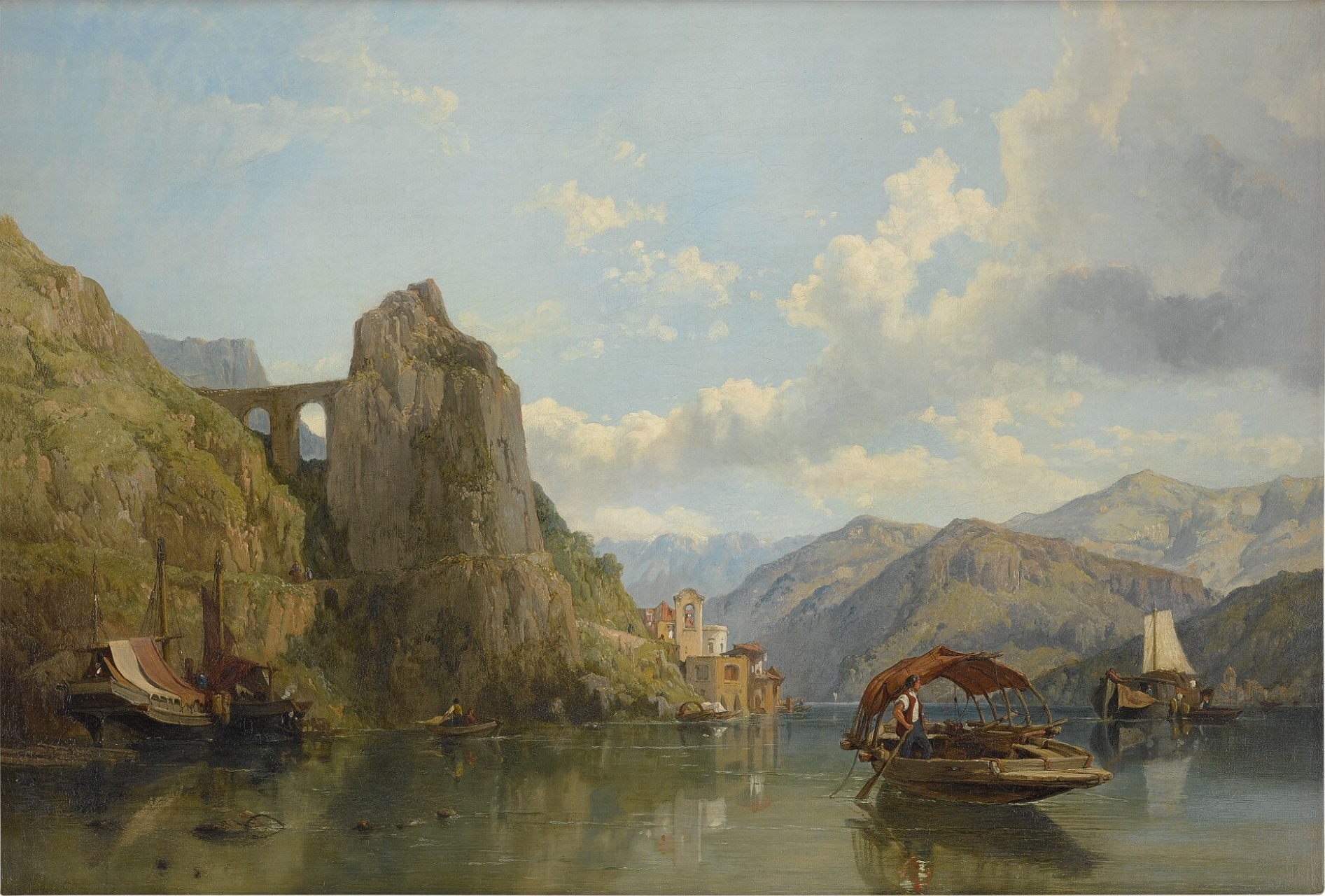
Near Loggio, on the Lake of Lugano

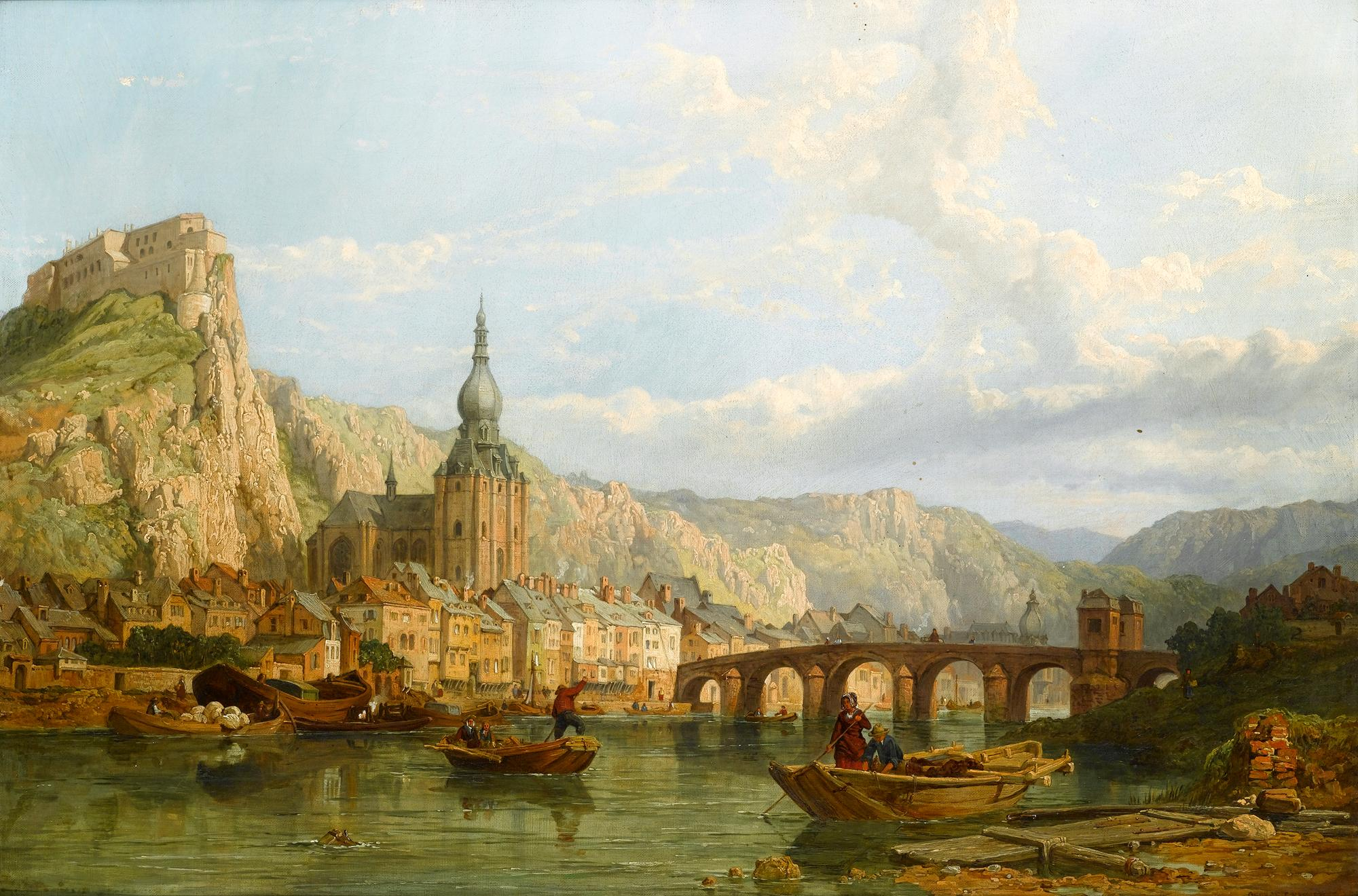
A View of Dinant, Belgium

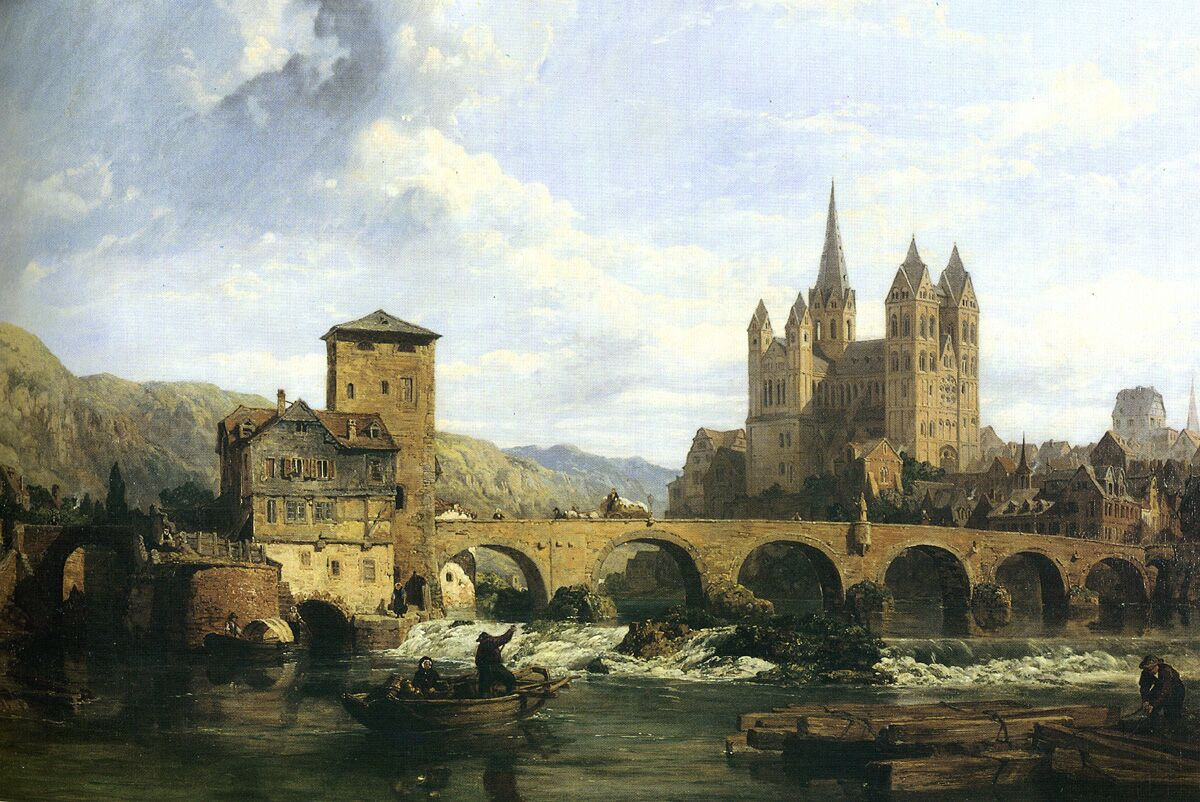
Limburg seen from the west (1862)

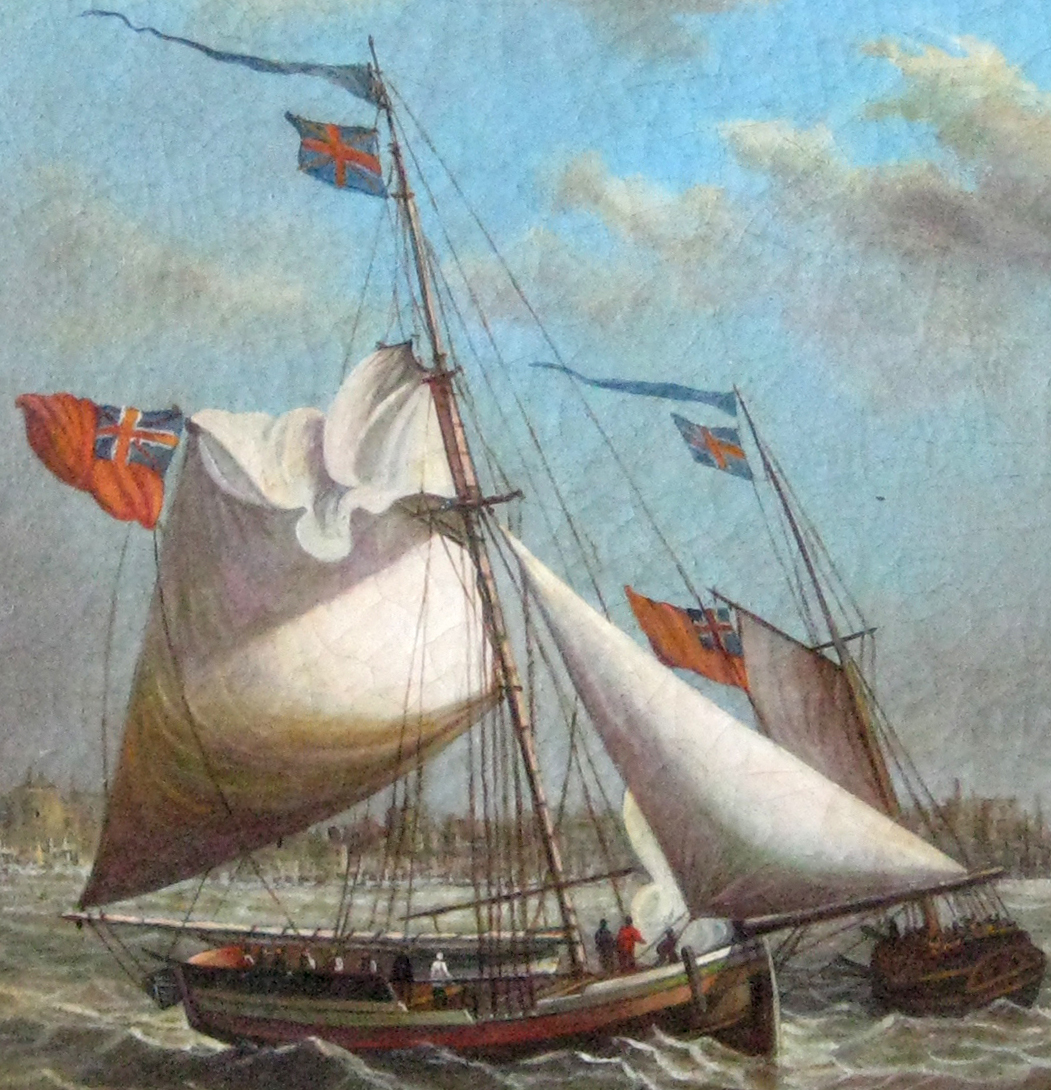
Shipping off the Coast
