= Horace Vernet =

French painter (1789–1863)

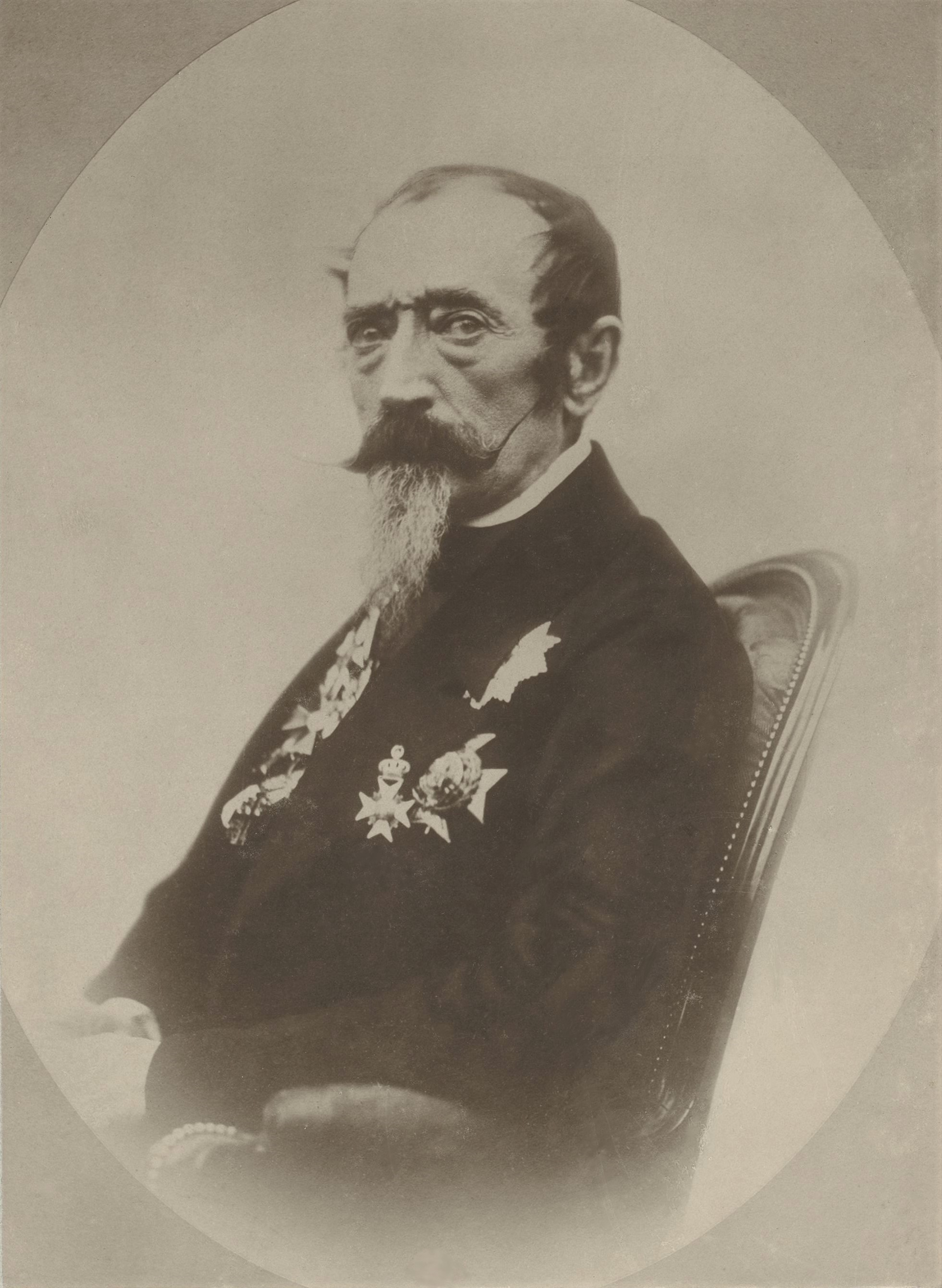
- Vernet in 1858
- Born: Émile Jean-Horace Vernet; 30 June 1789; Paris, France
- Died: 17 January 1863 (aged 73); Paris, France
- Known for: Painter; draughtsman; lithographer
- Movement: Orientalist

Émile Jean-Horace Vernet (French pronunciation: [emil ʒɑ̃ ɔʁas vɛʁnɛ]; 30 June 1789 – 17 January 1863), better known as Horace Vernet, was a French painter of battles, portraits, and Orientalist subjects.

== Biography ==
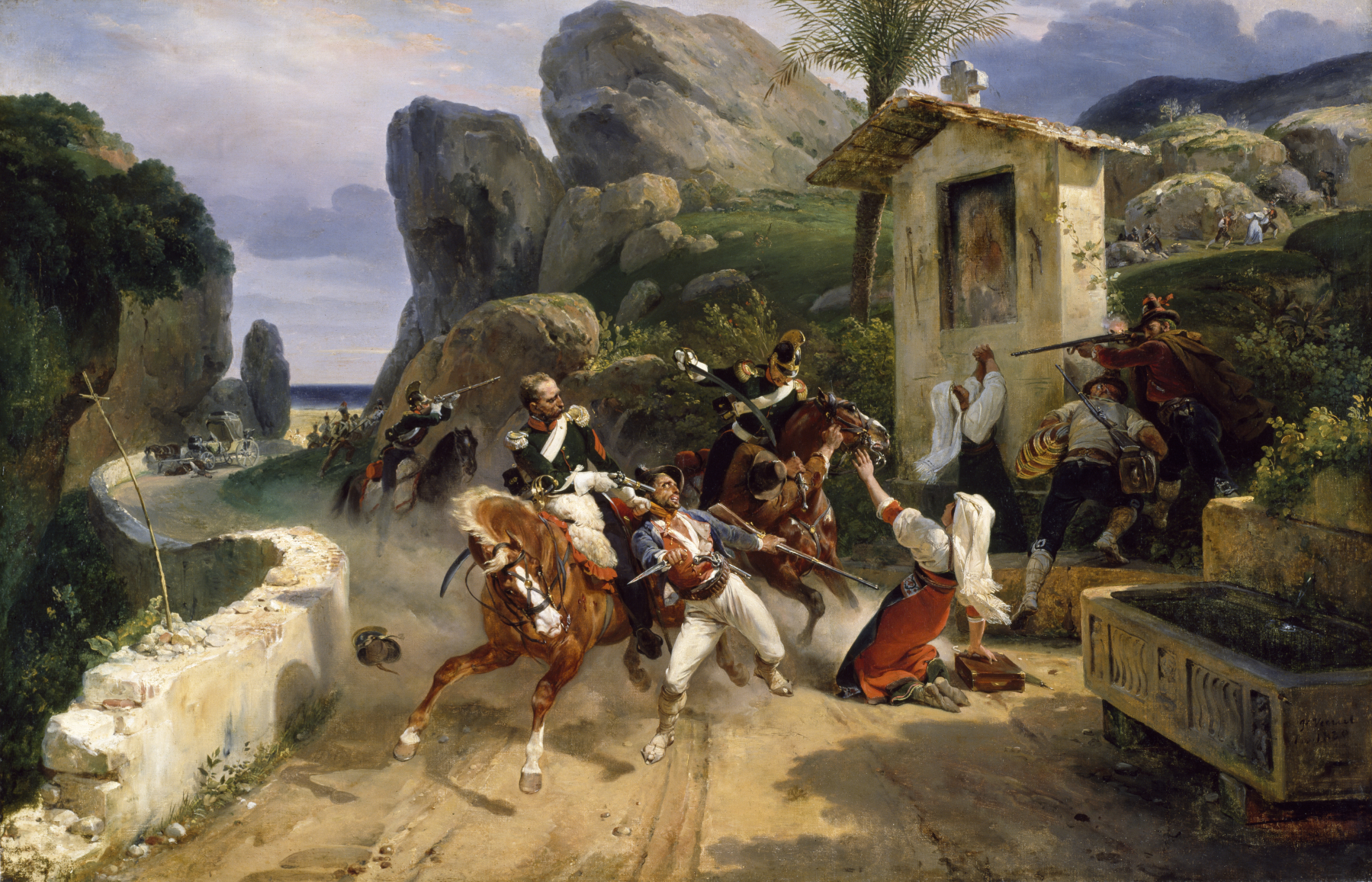
Italian Brigands Surprised by Papal Troops, 1831

=== Early career ===
Vernet was born to painter Carle Vernet, who was himself a son of Claude-Joseph Vernet, also a painter. He was born in the Paris Louvre, while his parents were staying there during the French Revolution. Vernet quickly developed a disdain for the high-minded seriousness of academic French art work which was distinguished by art influenced by Classicism, and decided to paint subjects taken mostly from contemporary life. During his early career, when Napoleon Bonaparte was in power, he began depicting the French soldier in a more familiar, vernacular manner rather than in an idealized, Davidian fashion; he was just twenty when he exhibited the Taking of an Entrenched Camp Some other of his paintings that represent French soldiers in a more direct, less idealizing style, include Dog of the Regiment, Trumpeter's Horse, and Death of Poniatowski.

=== Restoration France ===
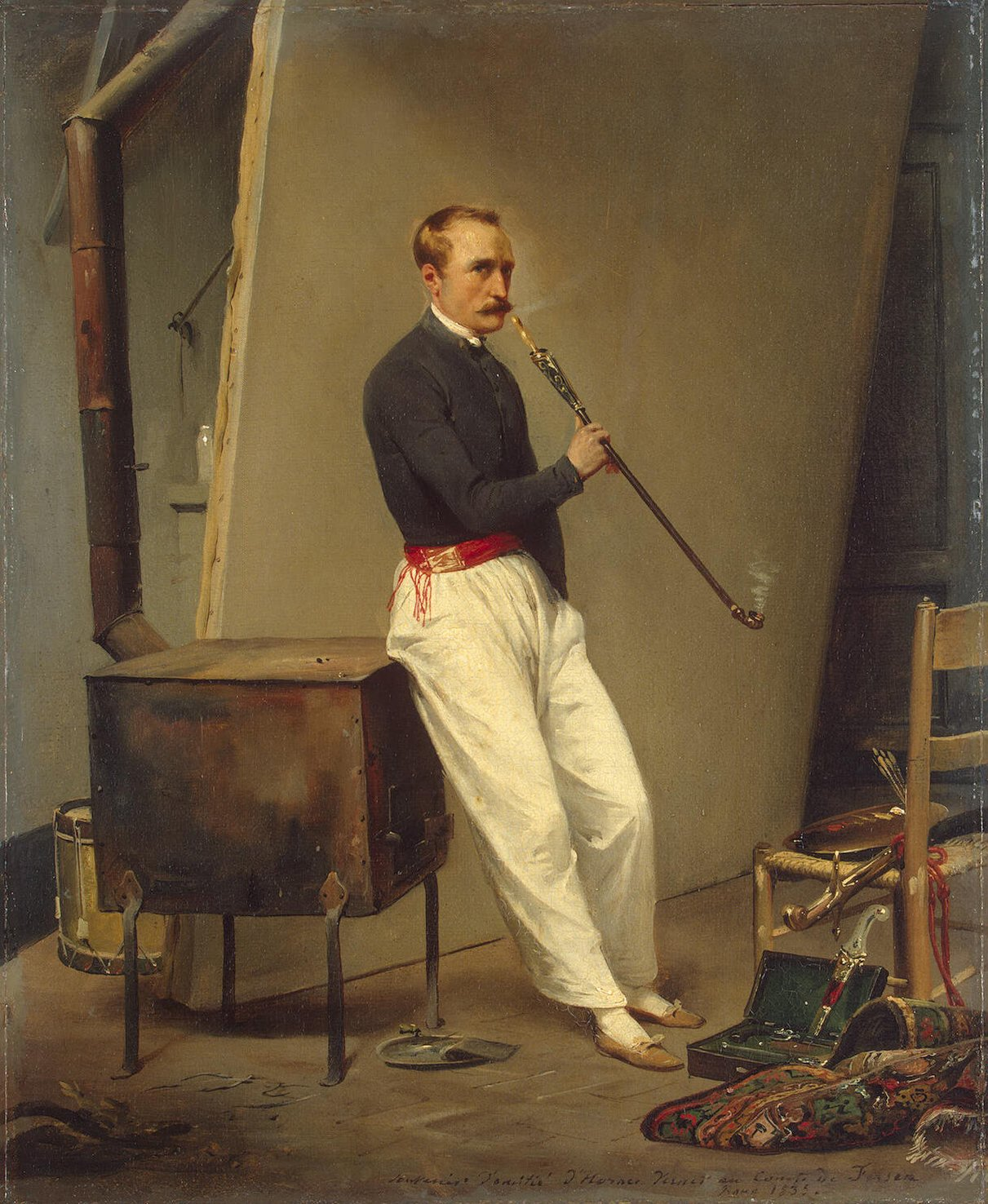
Self-Portrait with Pipe, 1835

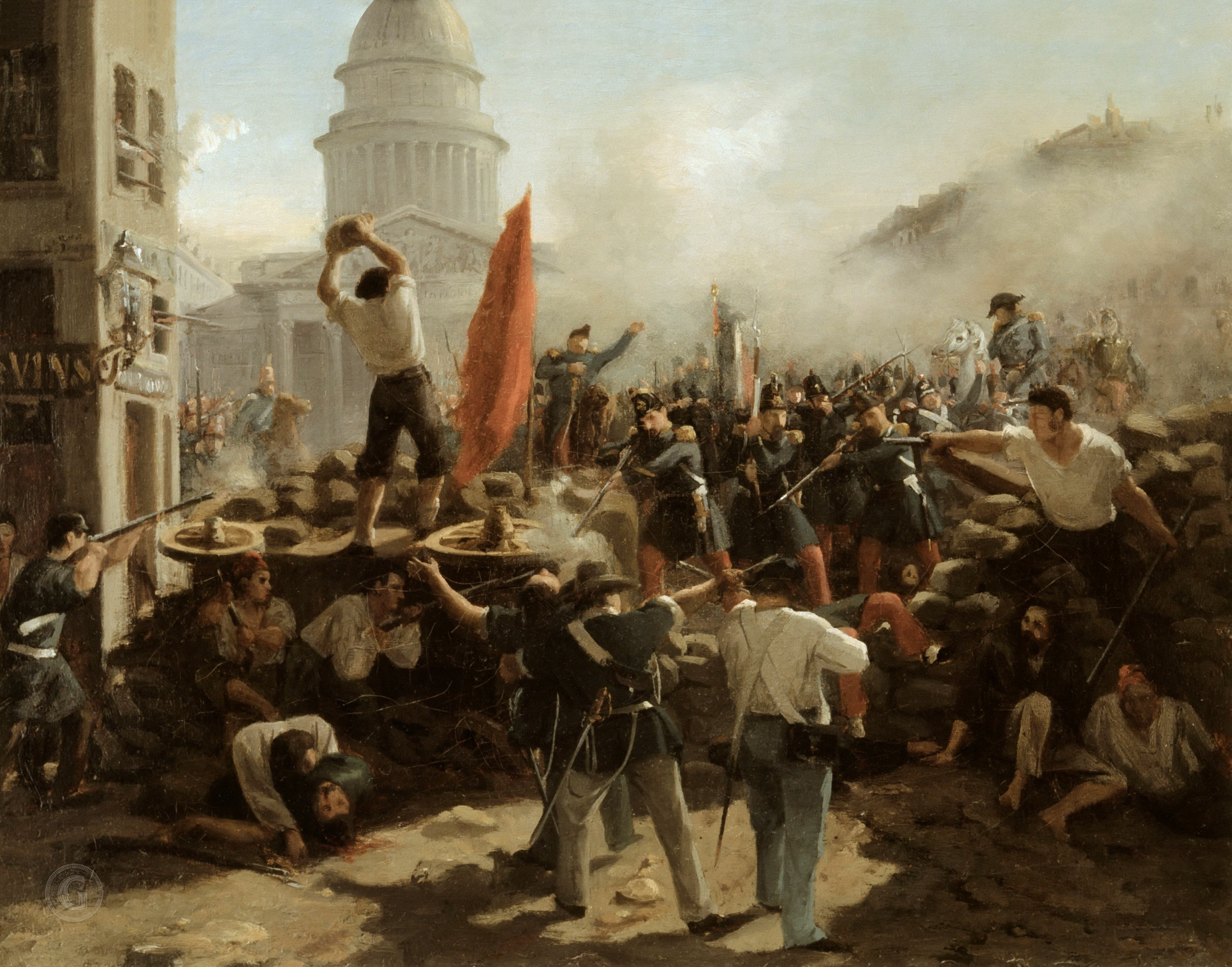
Street Fighting on Rue Soufflot, Paris, June 25, 1848

He gained recognition during the Bourbon Restoration for a series of battle paintings commissioned by the duc d'Orleans, the future King Louis Philippe I. Critics marvelled at the incredible speed with which he painted. Many of his paintings made during this early phase of his career were "noted for their historical accuracy as well as their charged landscapes". Examples of paintings in this style include his Four Battles series: The Battle of Jemappes (1821), The Battle of Montmirail (1822), The Battle of Hanau (1824), and The Battle of Valmy (1826). Enjoying equal favour with the court and with the opposition, he was appointed director of the French Academy in Rome, from 1829 to 1835.

Over the course of his long career, Horace Vernet was honoured with dozens of important commissions. King Louis-Philippe was one of his most prolific patrons, and the whole of the Constantine room at the Palace of Versailles was decorated by him, in the short space of three years. The King requested that he paint a gallery dedicated to the "fruits of colonization". At the time, France was colonizing Algeria through war, and claiming it to be part of their mission civilisatrice, or their "civilizing mission". In a neoclassical style, reflecting the Roman colonization in North Africa about 2000 years before, Horace painted pictures of French non-commissioned officers training Algerian soldiers, French engineers building Algerian roads, and French soldiers tilling Algerian fields.

=== Later career ===
His depictions of Algerian battles, such as the Capture of the Smahla and the Capture of Constantine, were well received by other French people, as they were vivid depictions of their army in the heat of battle. After the fall of the July Monarchy during the Revolution of 1848, Vernet discovered a new patron in Napoléon III of France. He continued to paint representations of the heroic French army during the Second Empire and maintained his commitment to and realistic way. He accompanied the French Army during the Crimean War, producing several paintings, truthfully including one of the Battle of the Alma, which was not as well received as his earlier paintings. One well known and possibly apocryphal anecdote maintains that when Vernet was asked to remove a certain obnoxious general from one of his paintings, he replied, "I am a painter of history, sire, and I will not violate the truth", hence demonstrating his fidelity to representing war.

Vernet also developed an interest in daguerreotype photography. He took photographs in Egypt as reference material for his paintings, and during a stop at Malta in March 1840 while en route to Egypt, he took the earliest known photographs of the island at Fort Manoel. Today these early photographs are believed to be lost.

His nephew Frédéric Goupil-Fesquet, also a painter and his pupil, wrote Voyage d'Horace Vernet en Orient (2 volumes, 1844).

Vernet died in his hometown of Paris in 1863.

== Literary references ==
In Arthur Conan Doyle's Sherlock Holmes story "The Adventure of the Greek Interpreter", Holmes claims to be related to Vernet, stating, "My ancestors were country squires... my grandmother... was the sister of Vernet, the French artist"; it is generally assumed that this individual is Émile Jean-Horace Vernet, because Horace was only 65 years older than Sherlock Holmes while the other Vernets lived much before. The Holmes-Vernet connection is also central to the plot of Laurie R. King's 2024 novel, The Lantern's Dance.

== Gallery ==
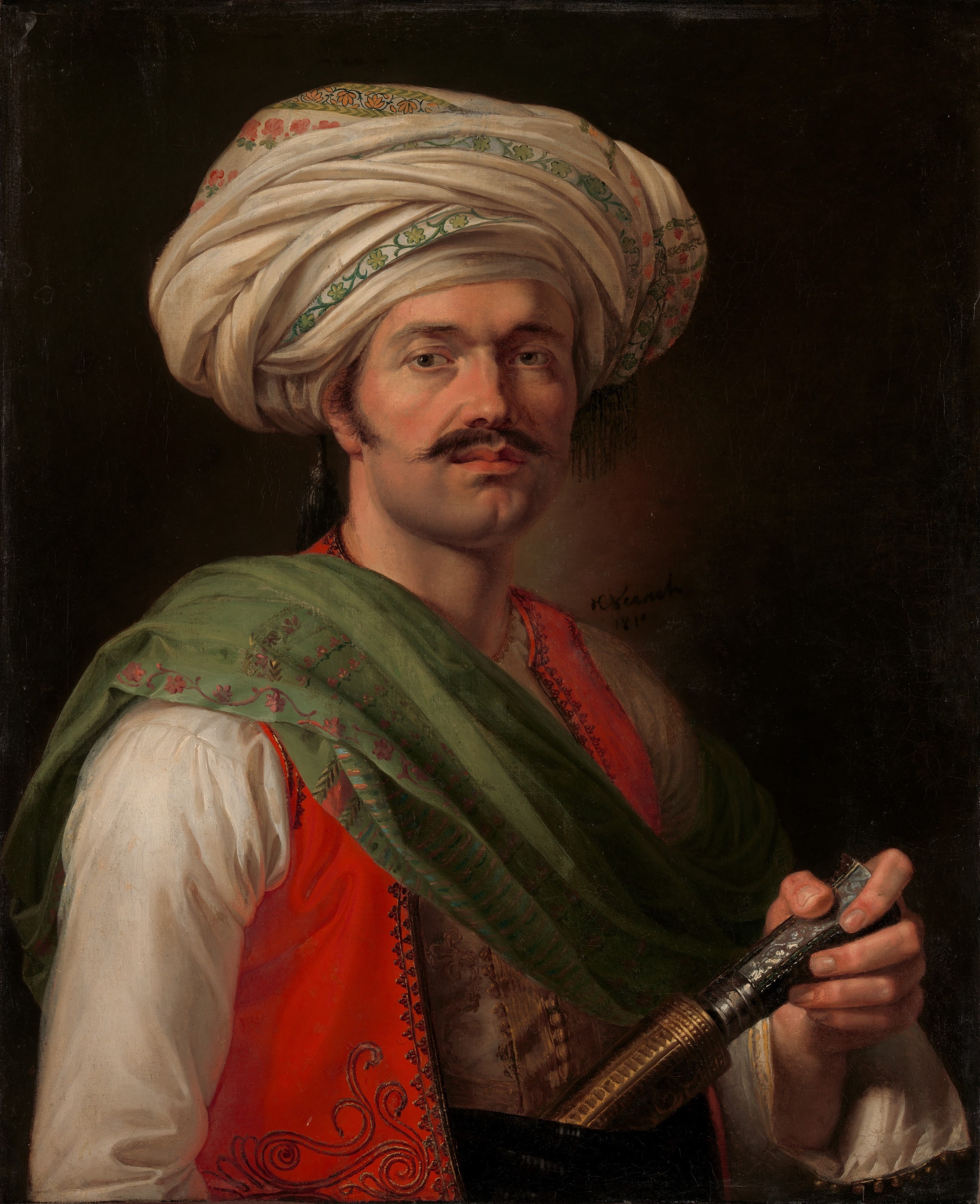
Portrait of Roustam Raza, 1810

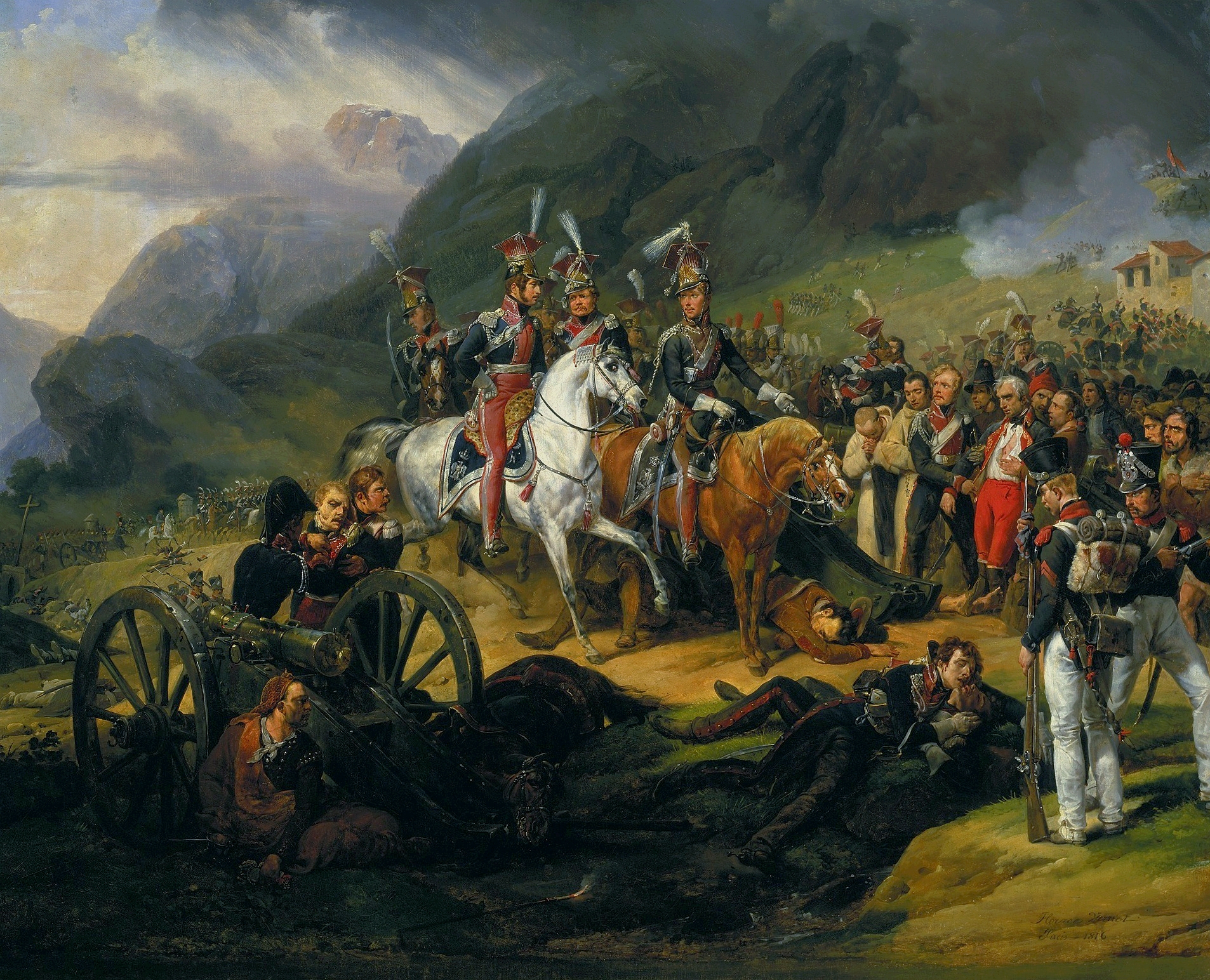
The Battle of Somosierra, 1816

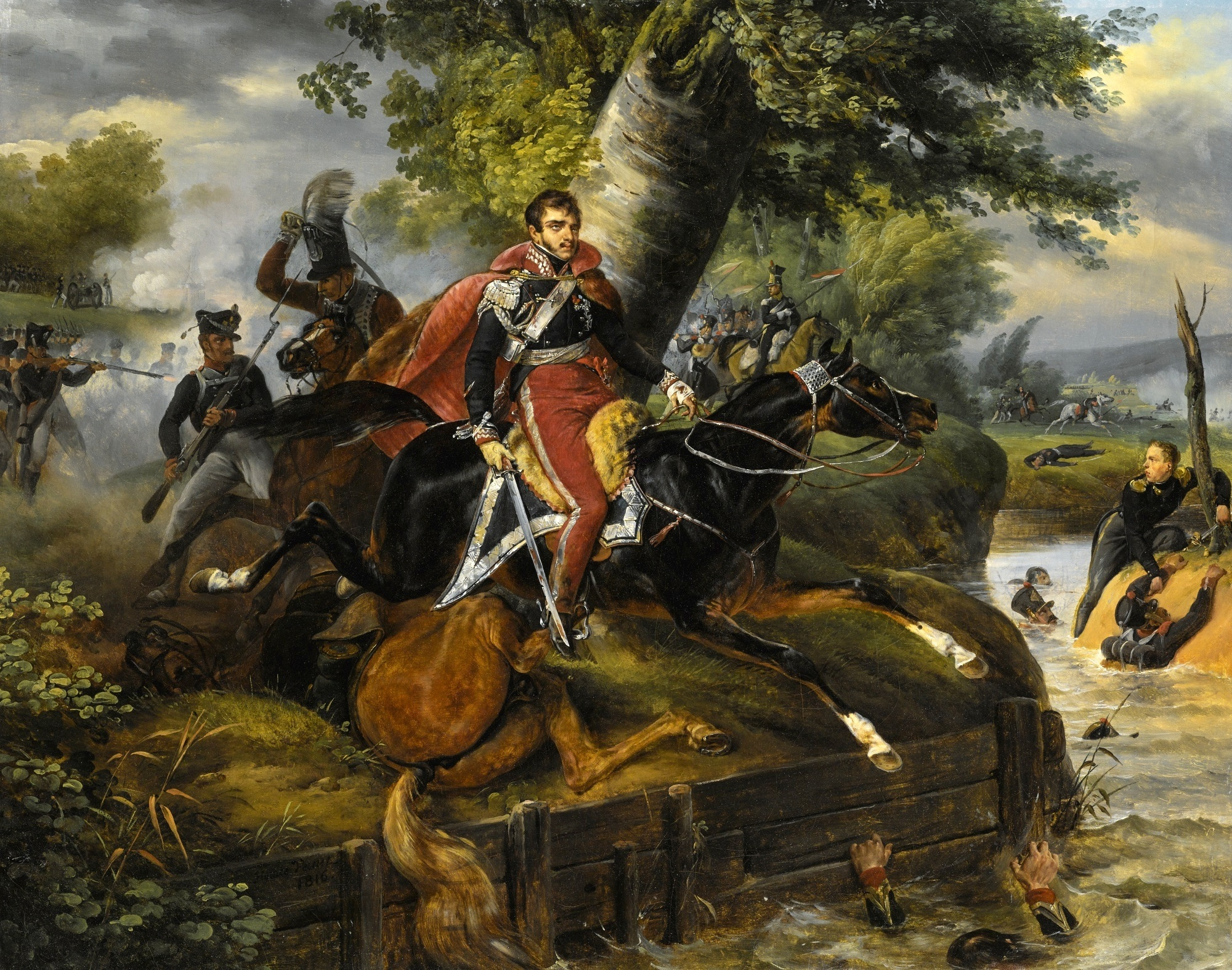
The Death of Prince Poniatowski, 1816

The Battle of Tolosa, 1817

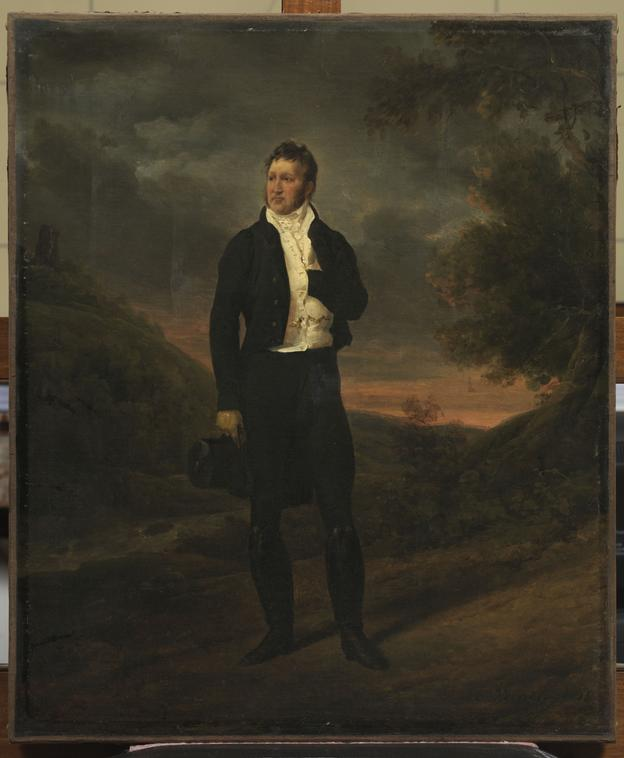
Portrait of the Duke of Orleans, 1818

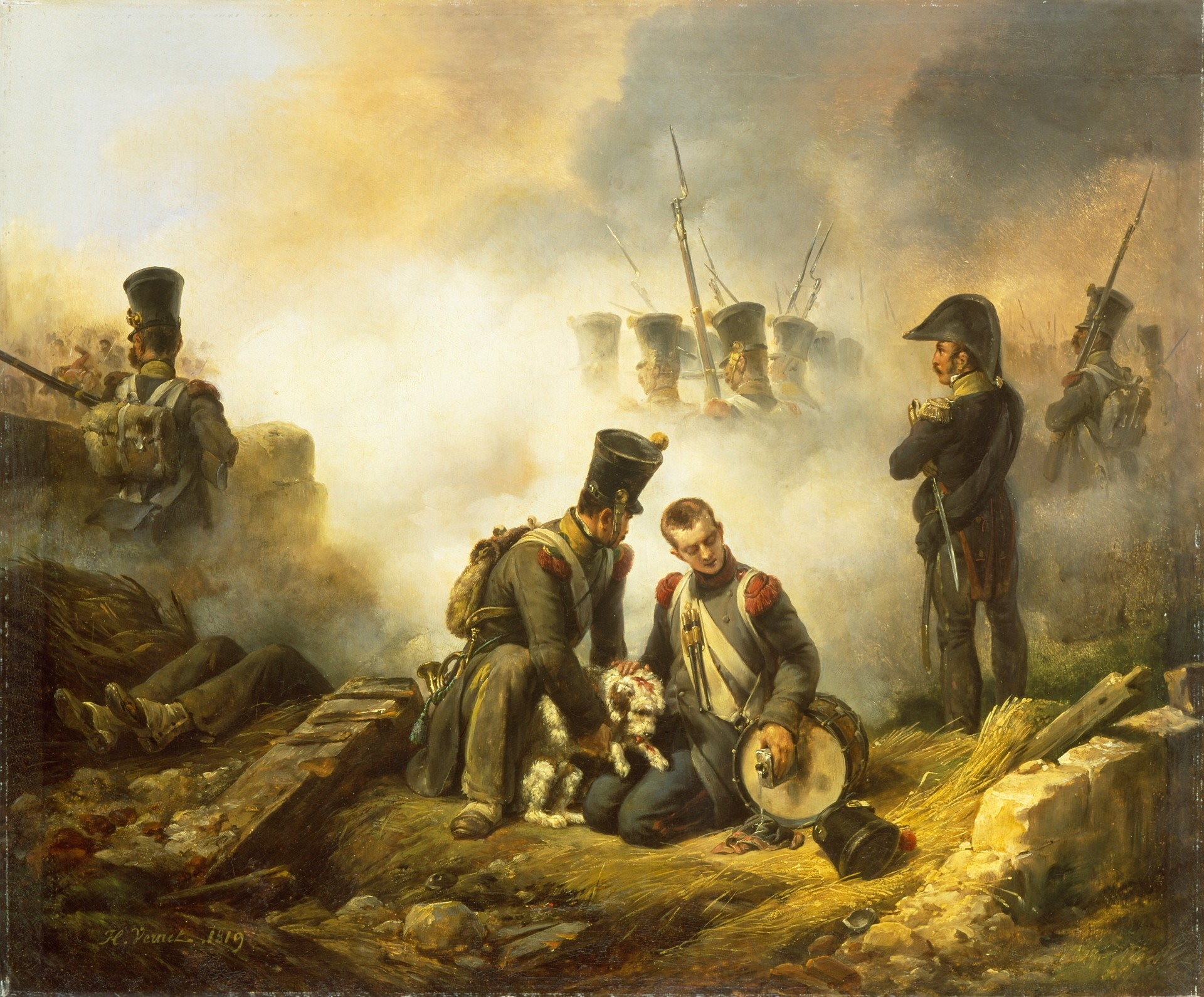
The Dog of the Regiment Wounded, 1819

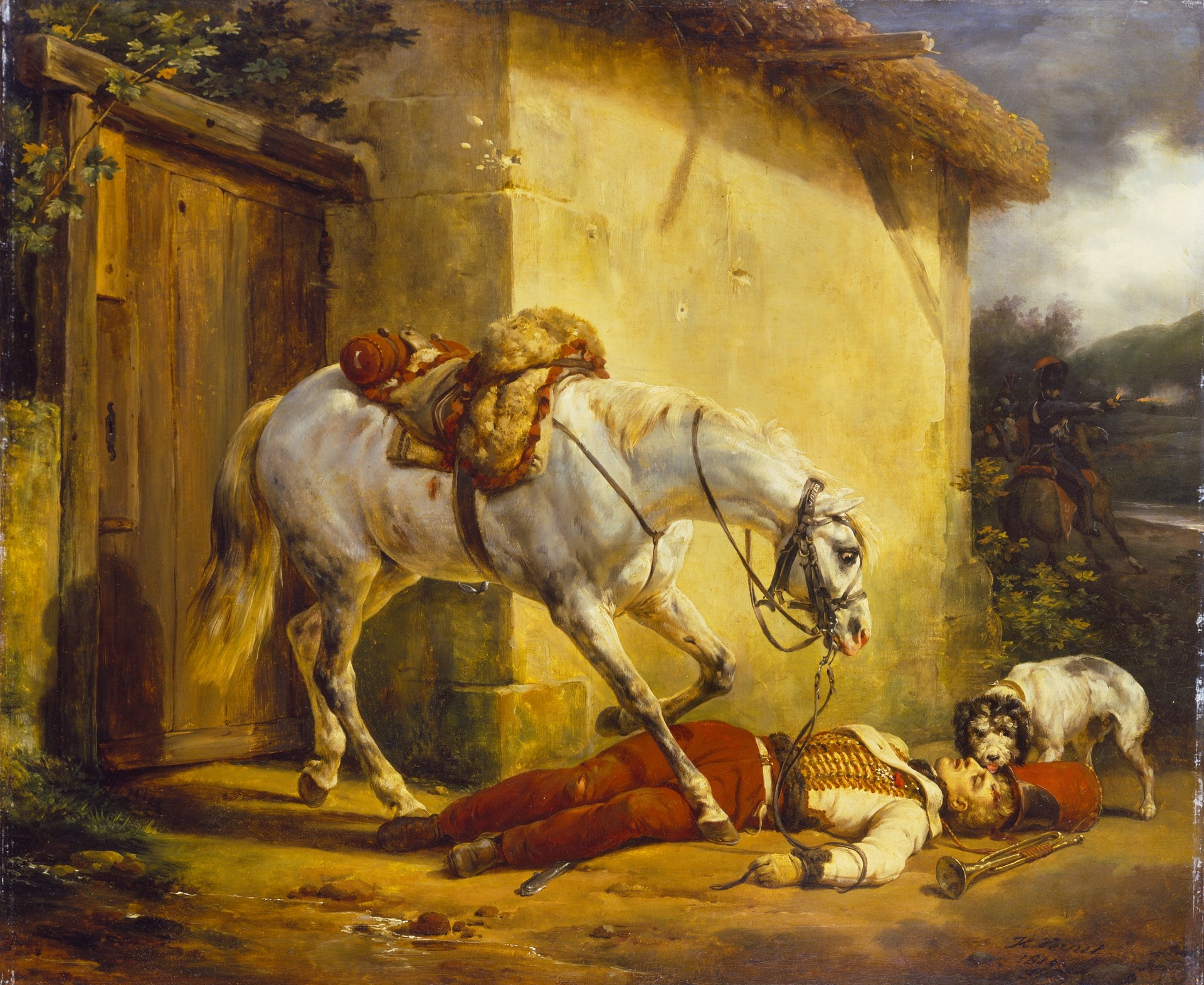
The Wounded Trumpeter, 1819

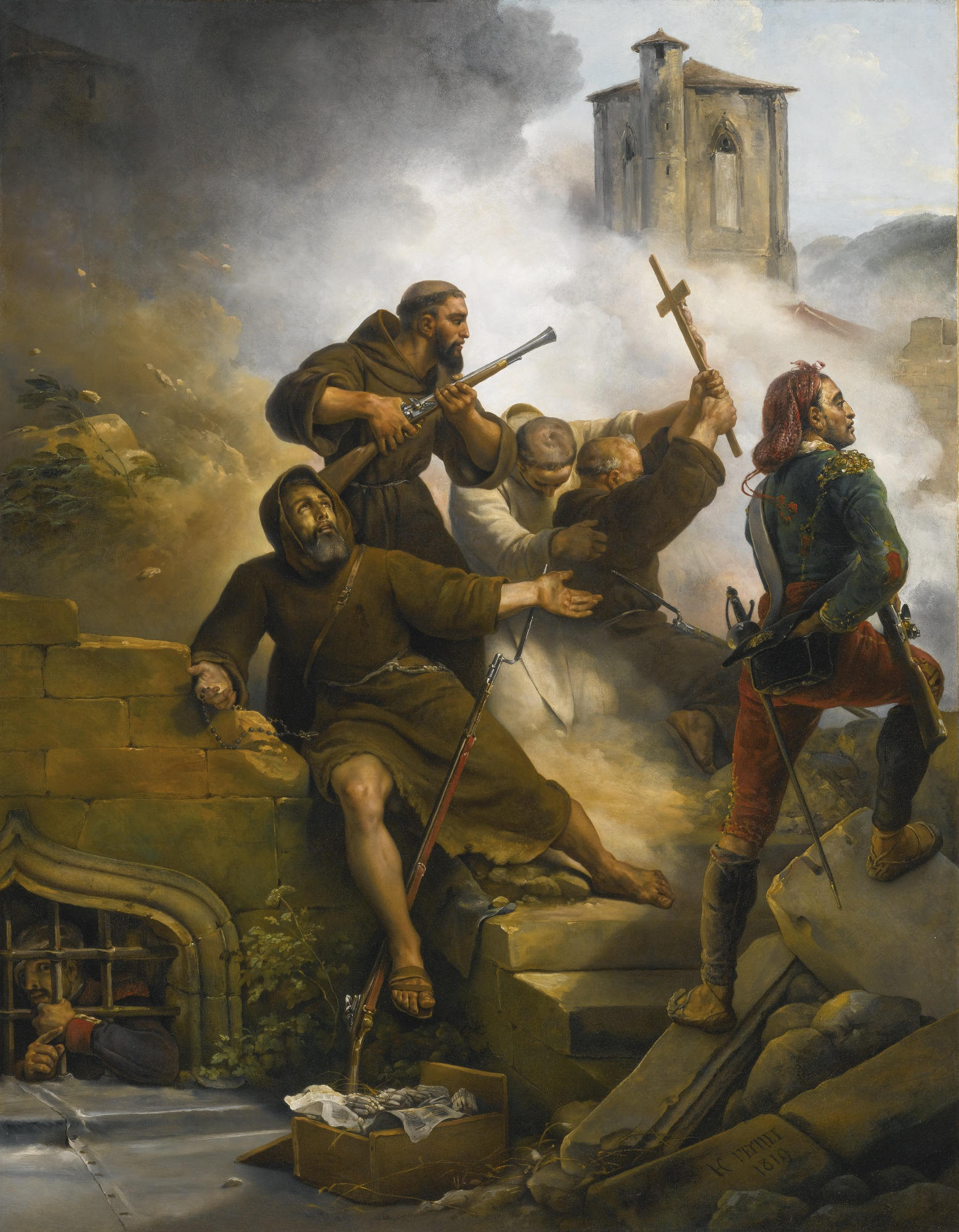
Siege of Saragossa, 1819

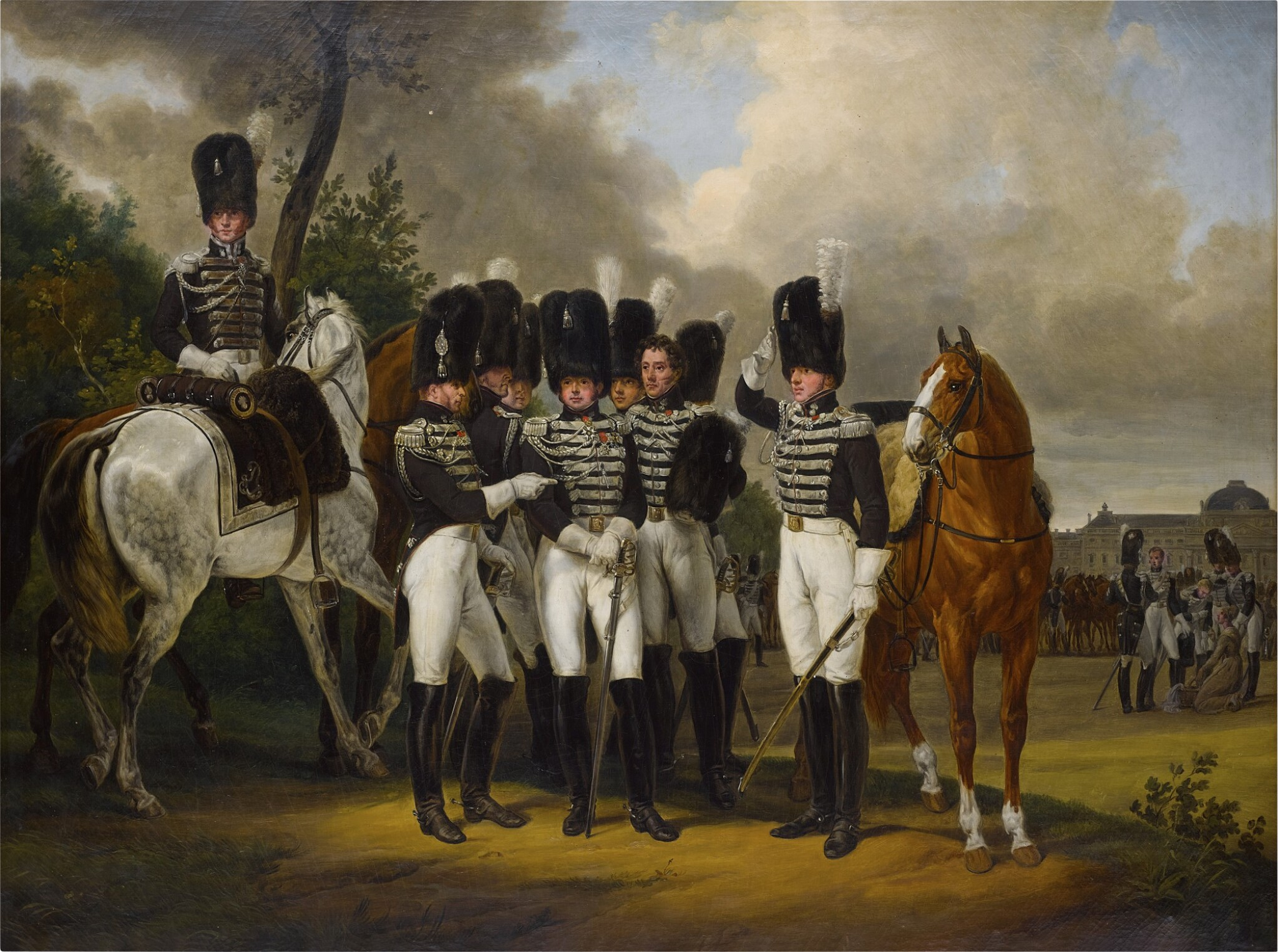
Portrait of the Général Marquis de Talhouët-Roy, 1819

Massacre of the Mamelukes at Cairo, 1819

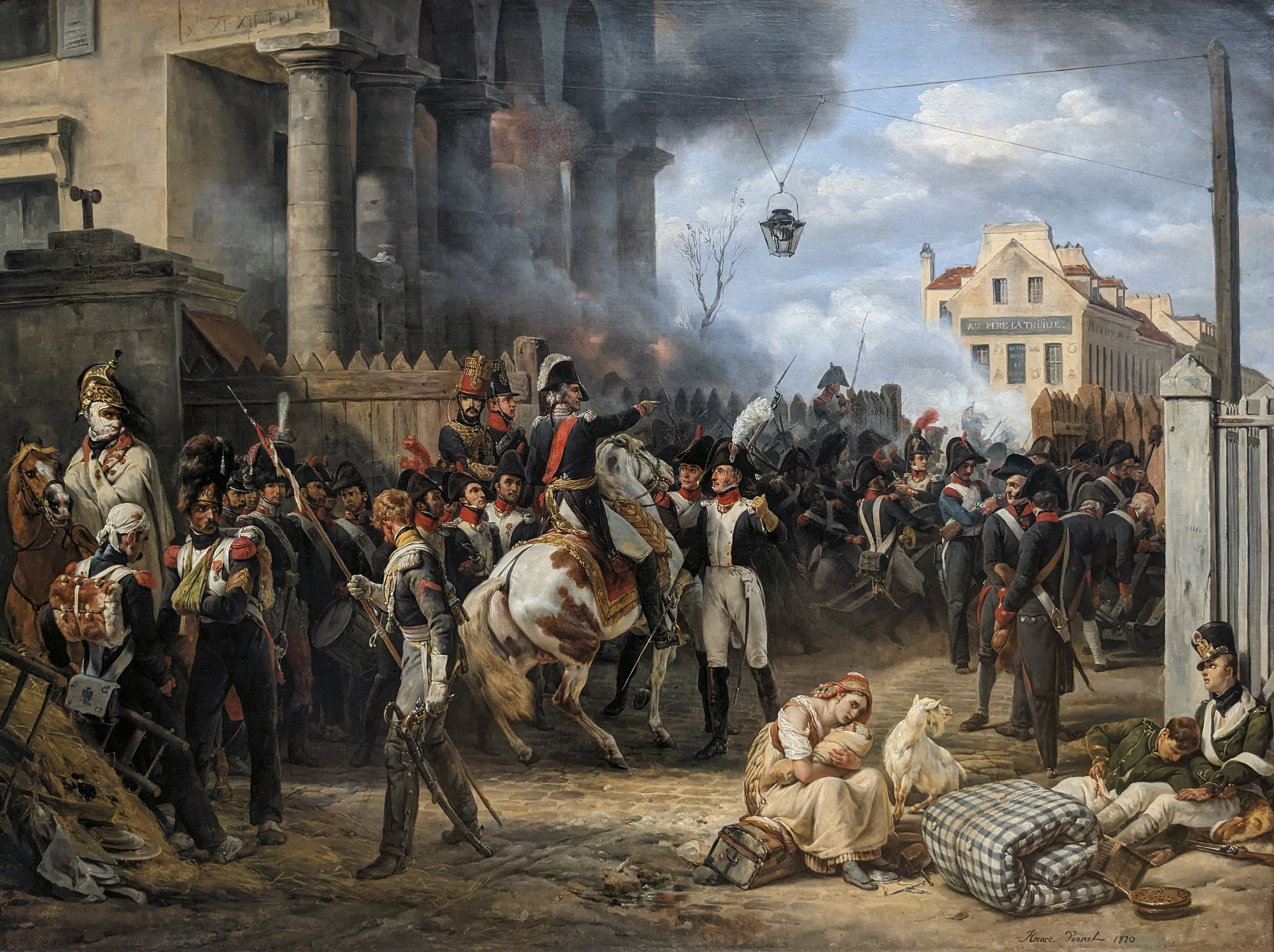
The Barrier of Clichy, 1820

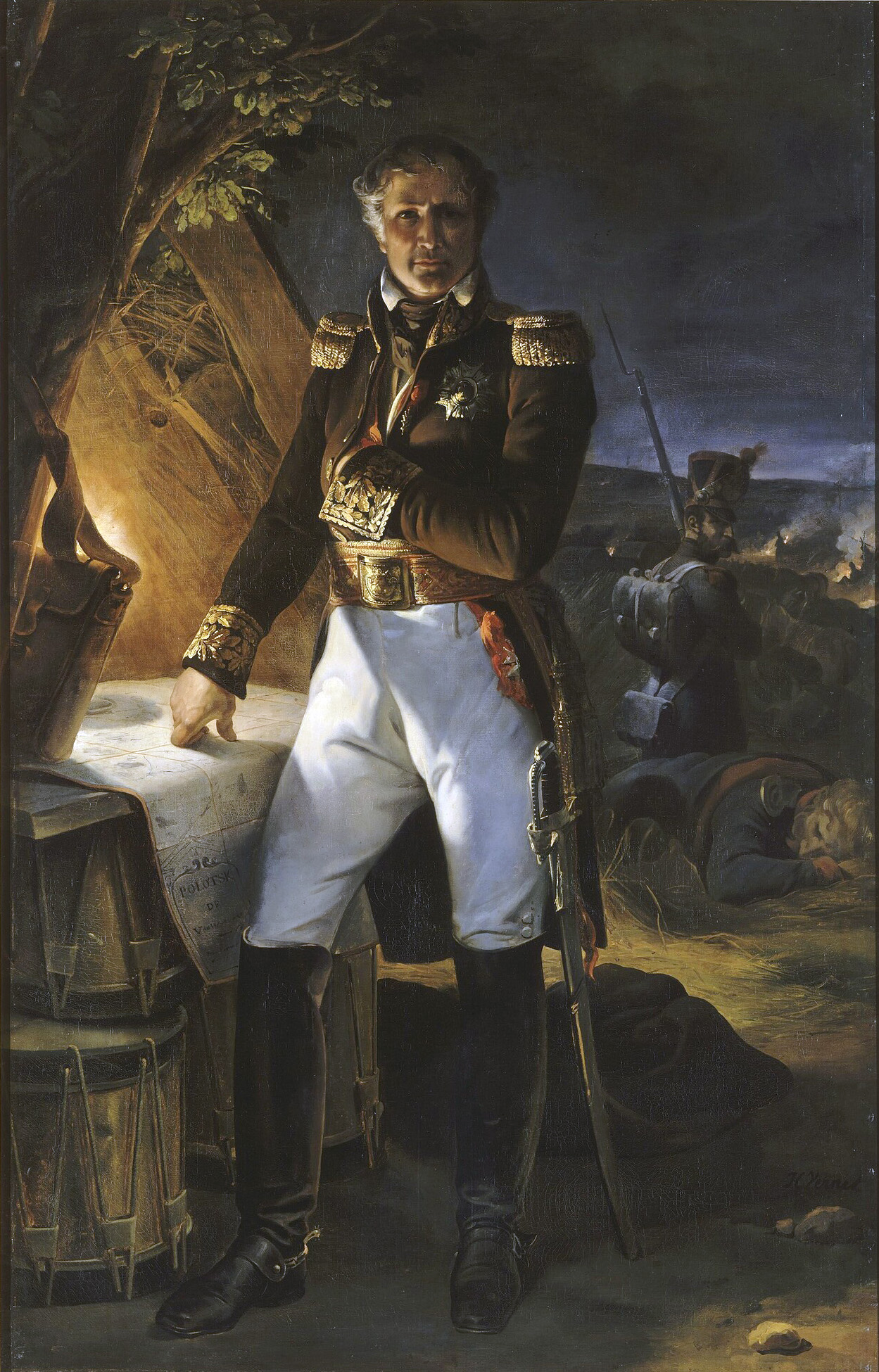
Portrait of Marshal Saint-Cyr, 1821

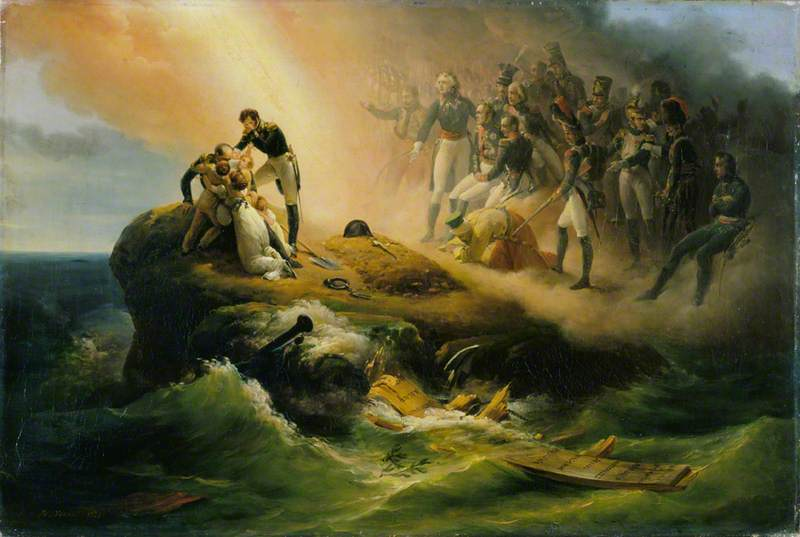
Napoleon's Tomb, 1821

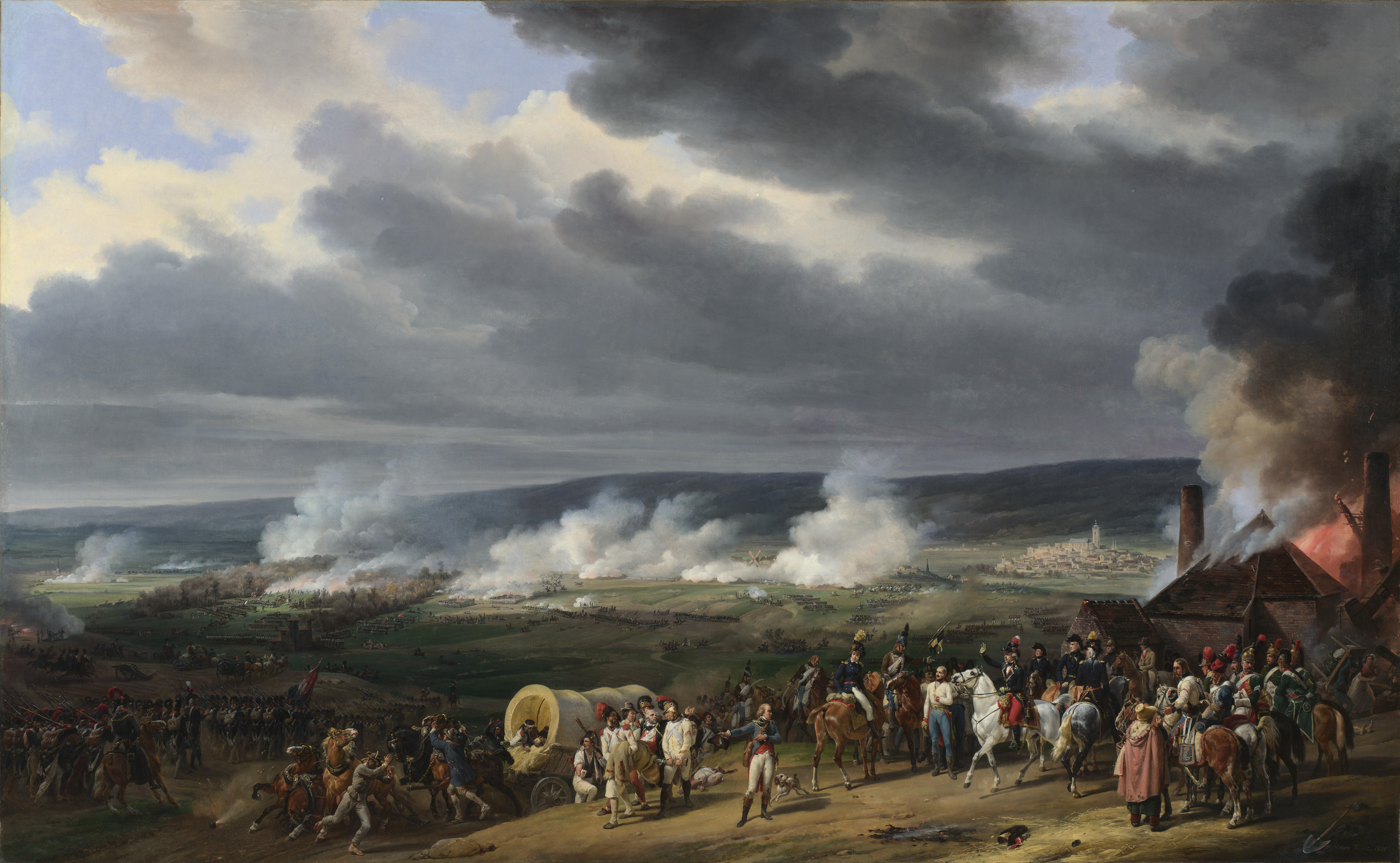
The Battle of Jemappes, 1821

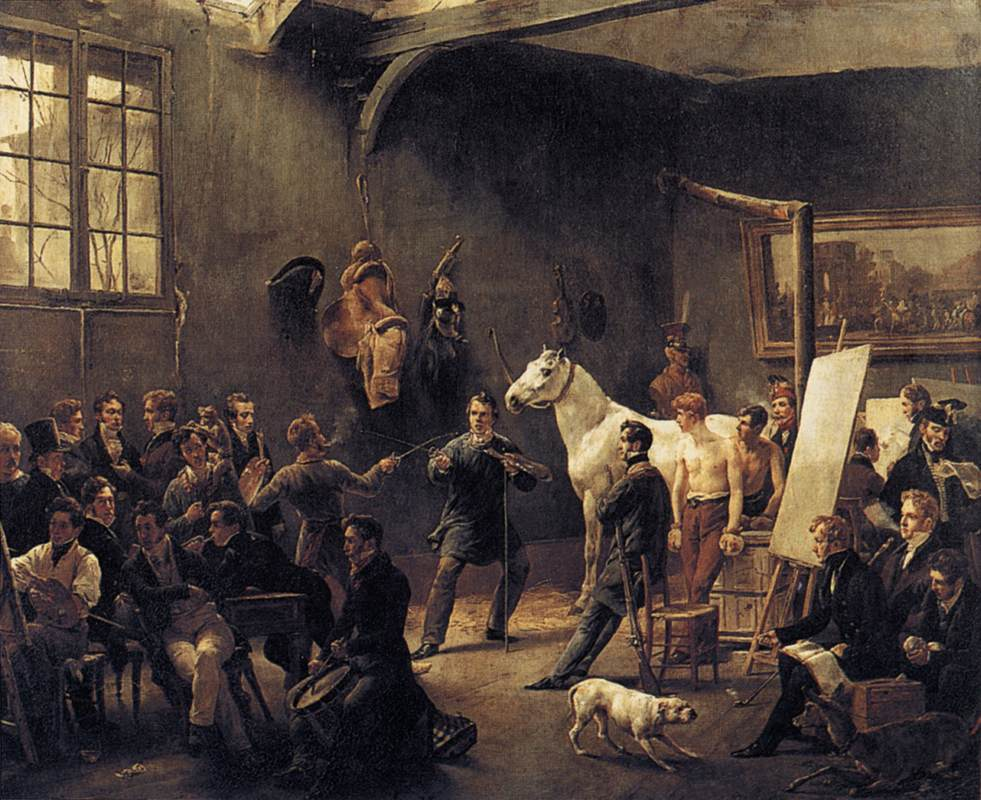
The Artist's Studio, 1821

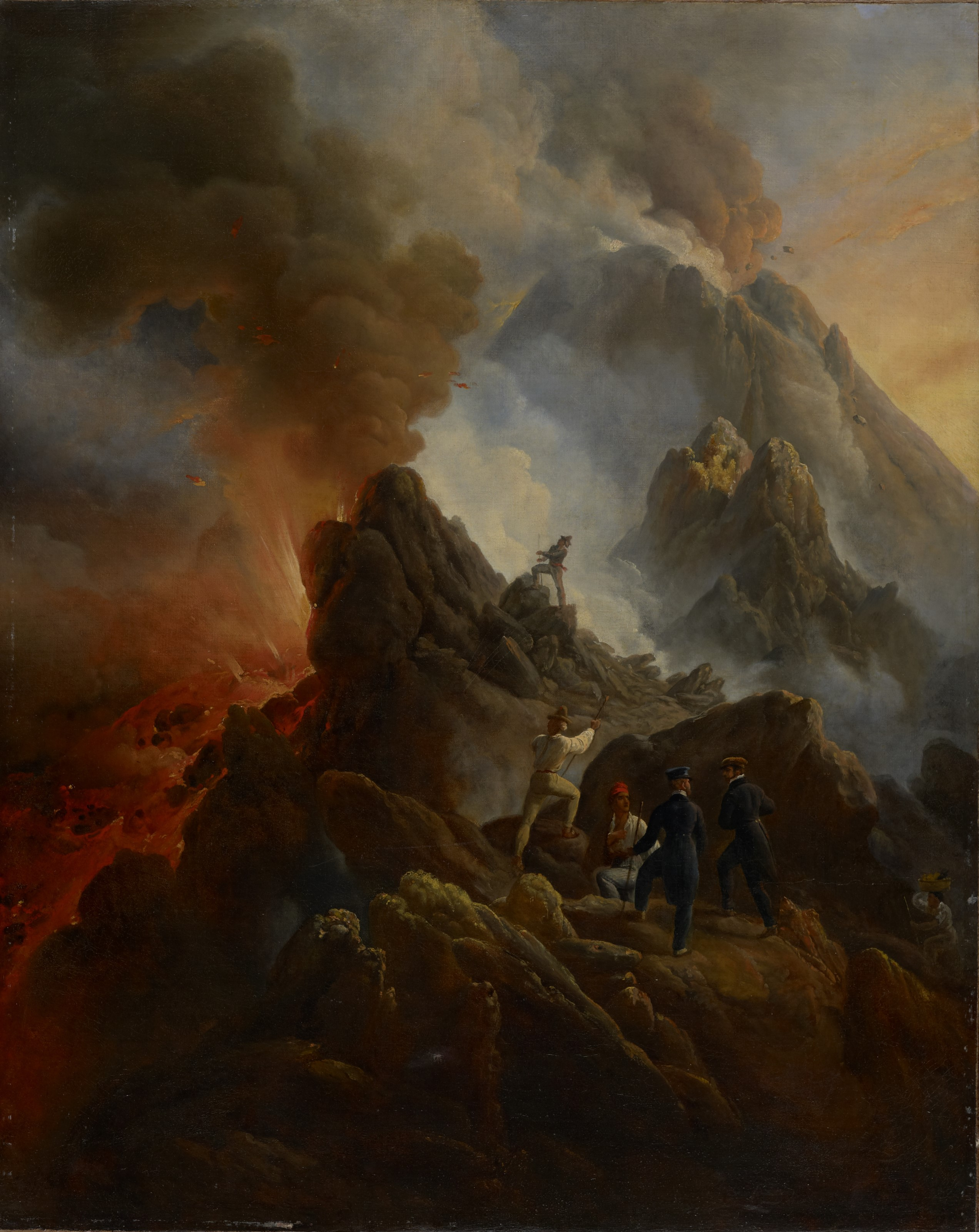
Vesuvius Erupting, 1822

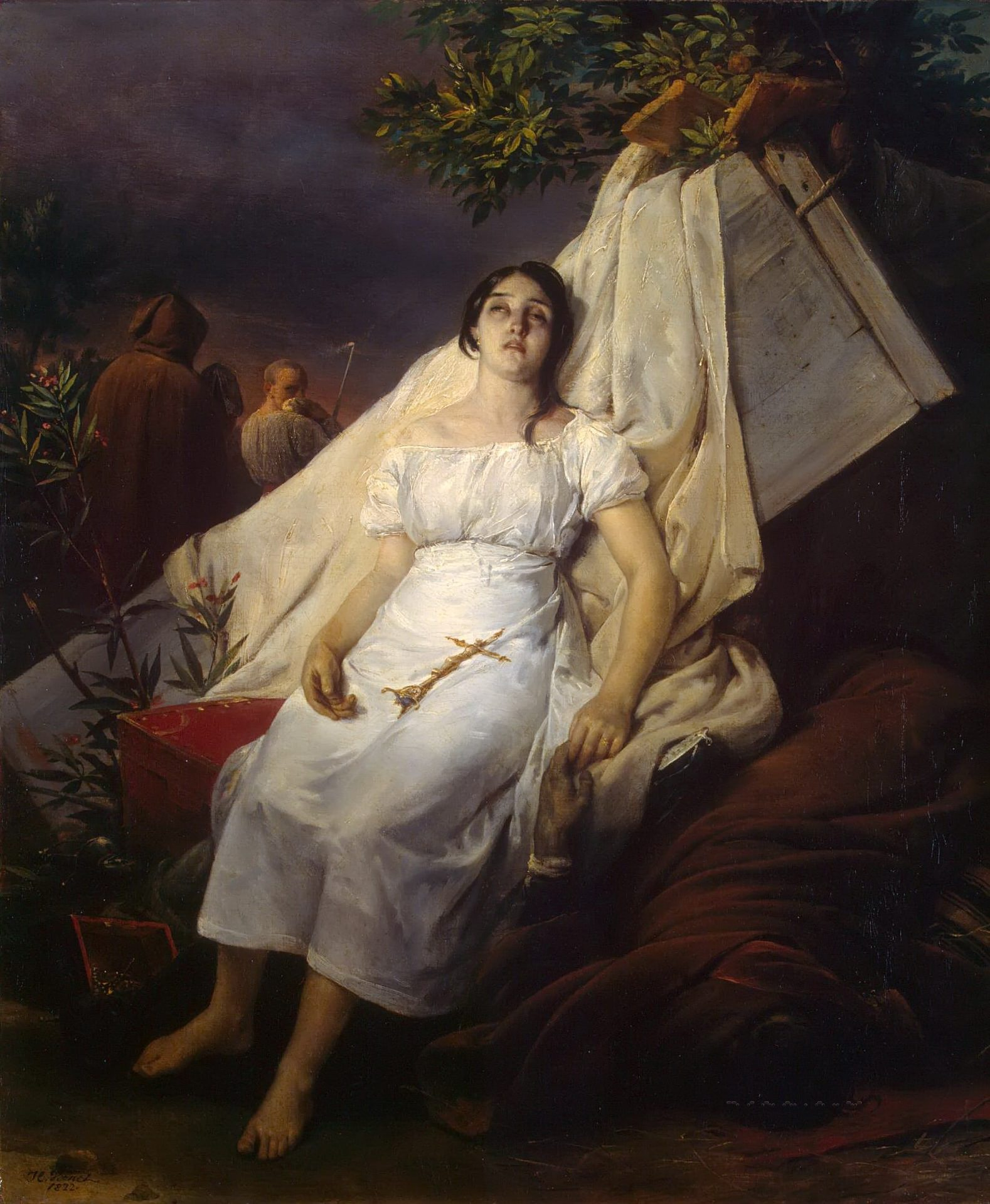
Plague in Barcelona, 1822

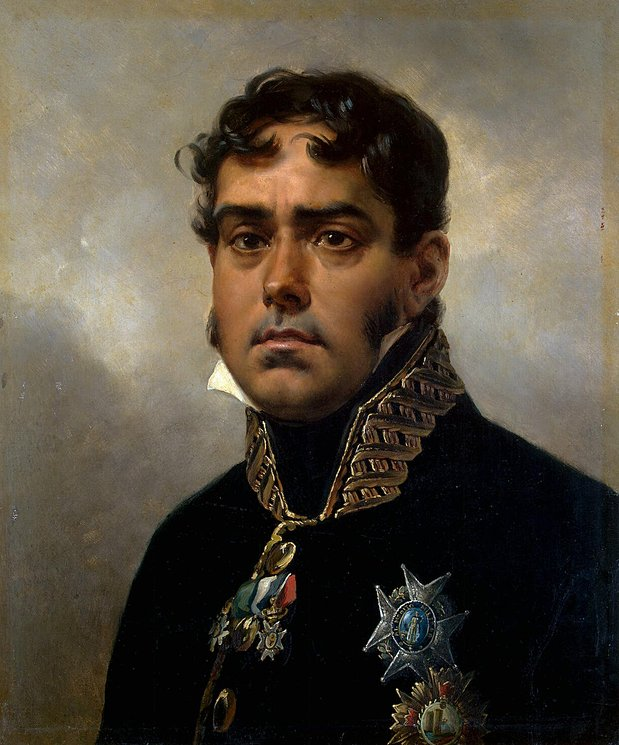
Portrait of Pablo Morillo, 1822

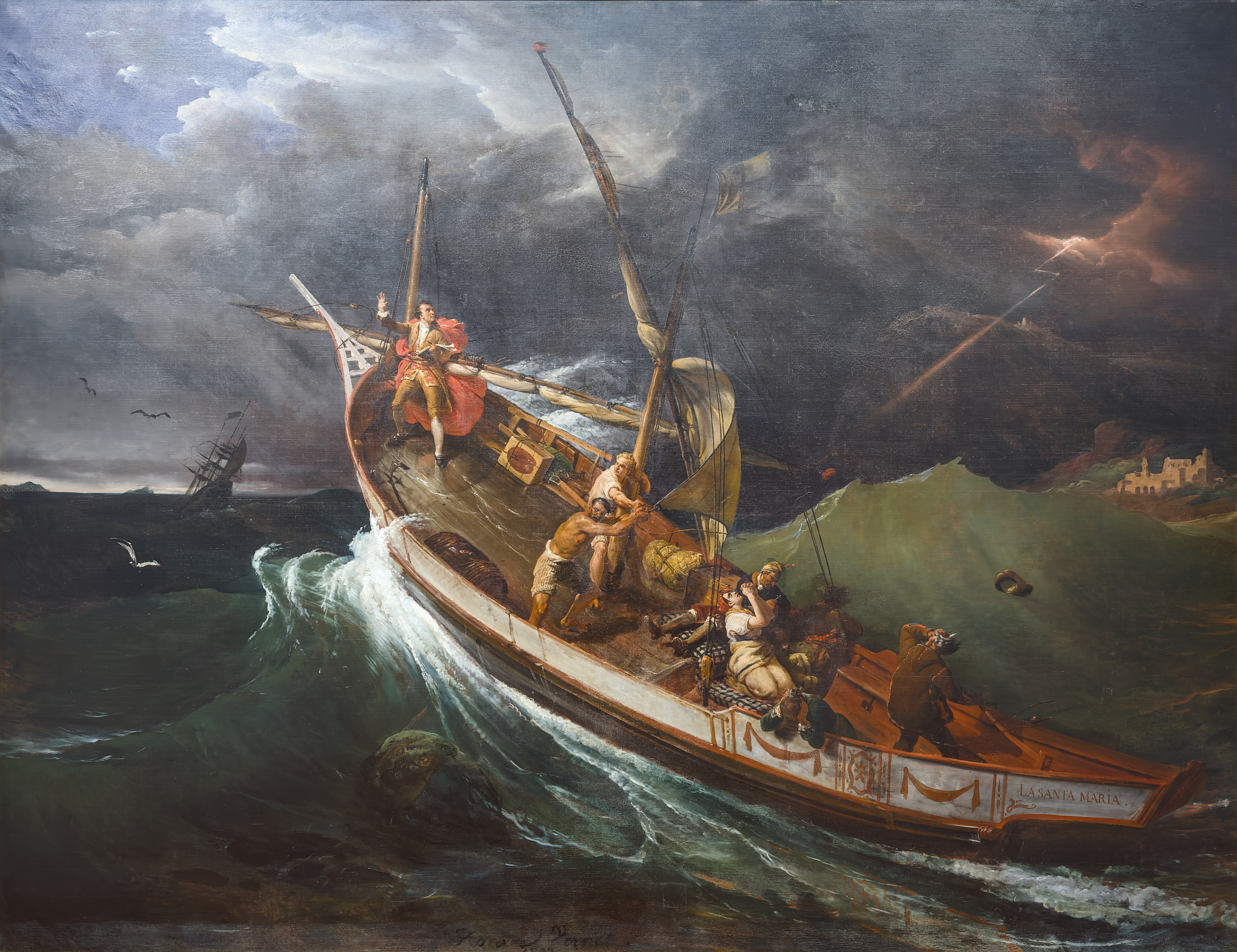
Joseph Vernet Tied to a Mast During a Storm, 1822

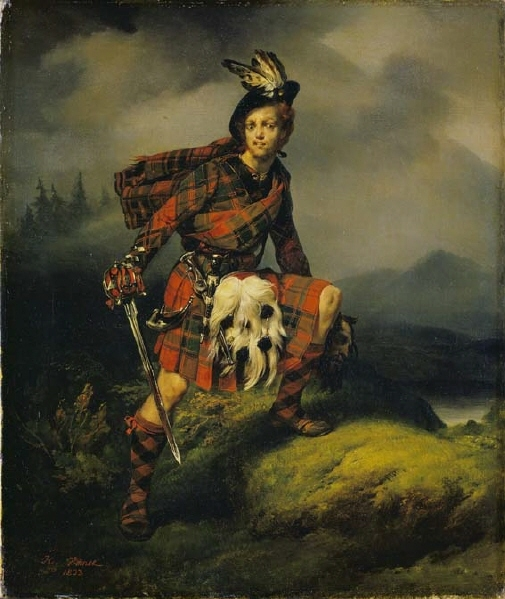
Allan M'Aulay, 1823

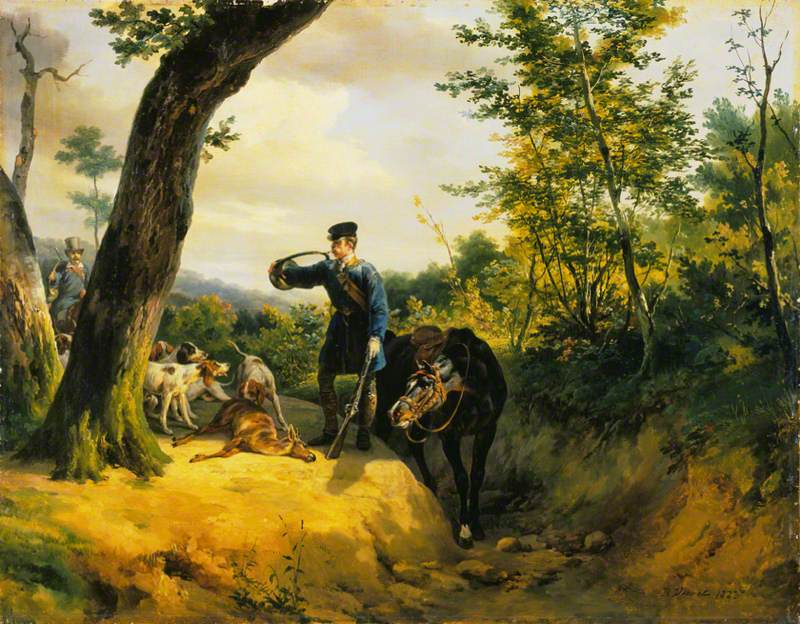
The Quarry, 1823

Napoleon in Charleroi, 1823

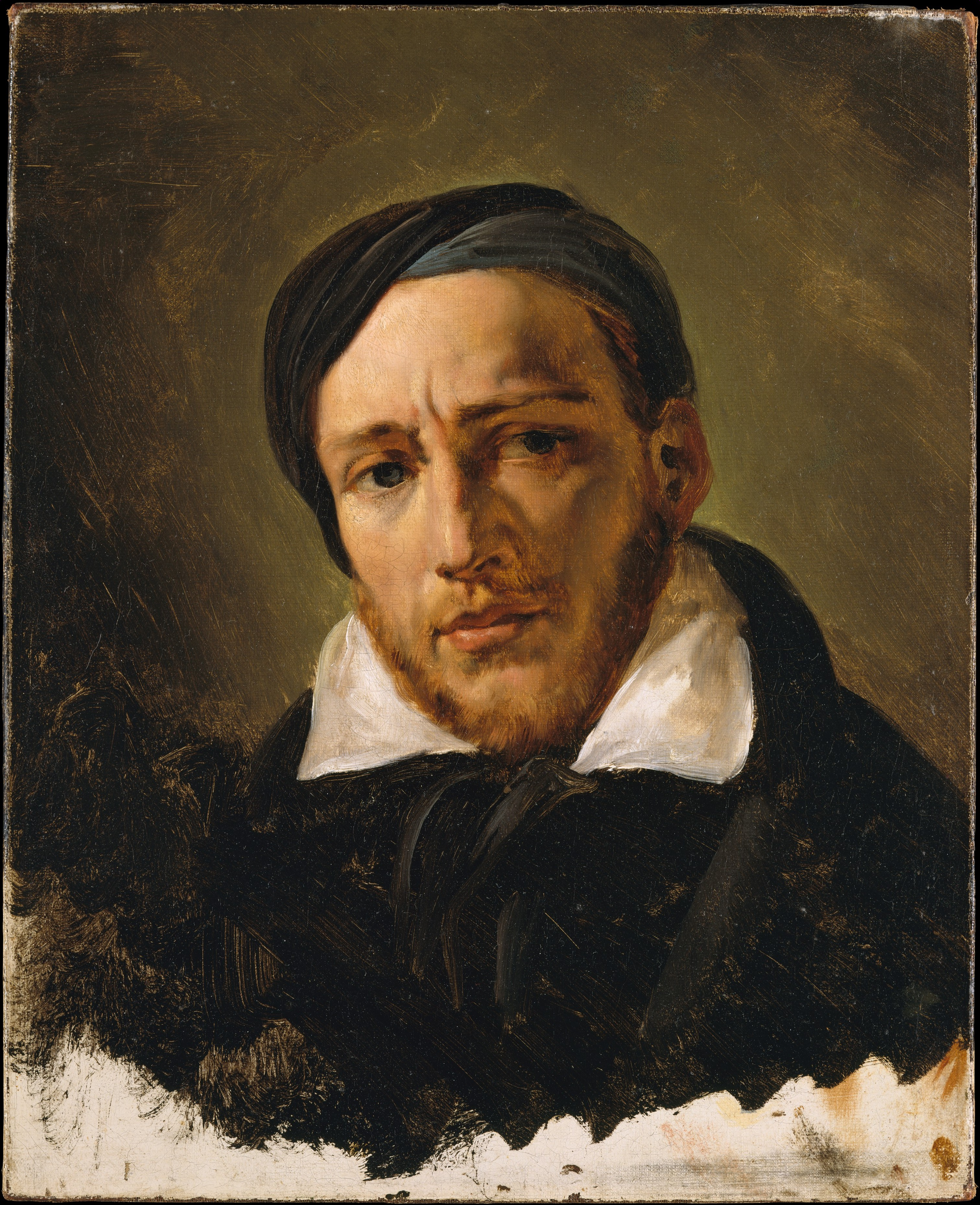
Portrait of Théodore Géricault, 1823

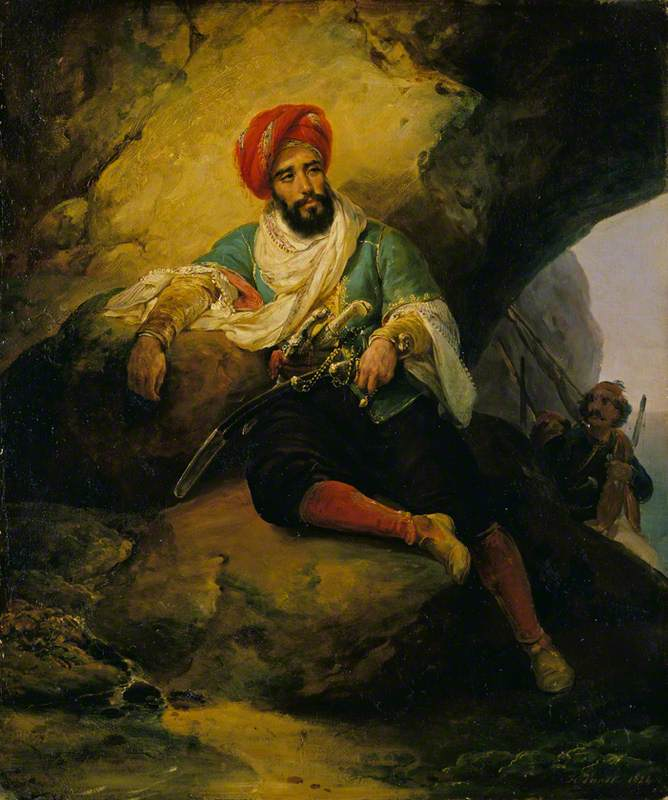
Conrad the Corsair, 1824

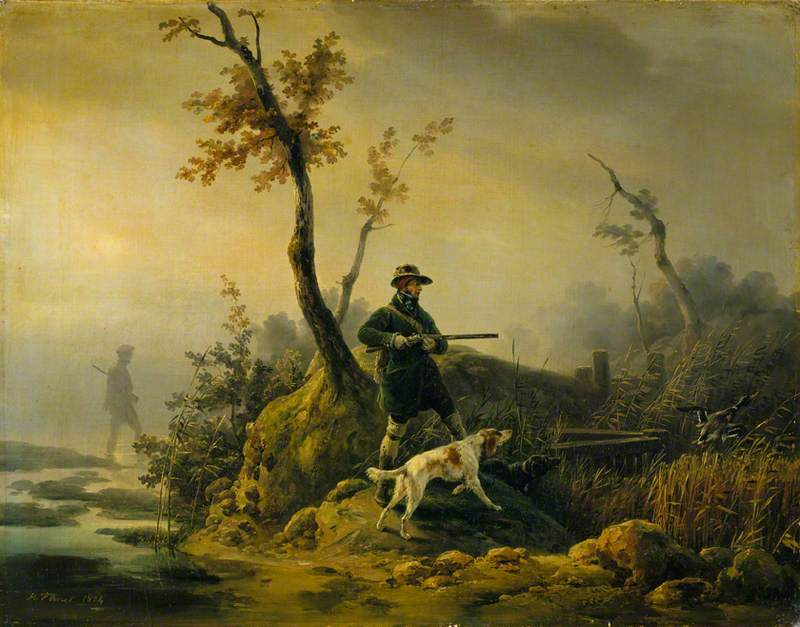
Duck Shooting, 1824

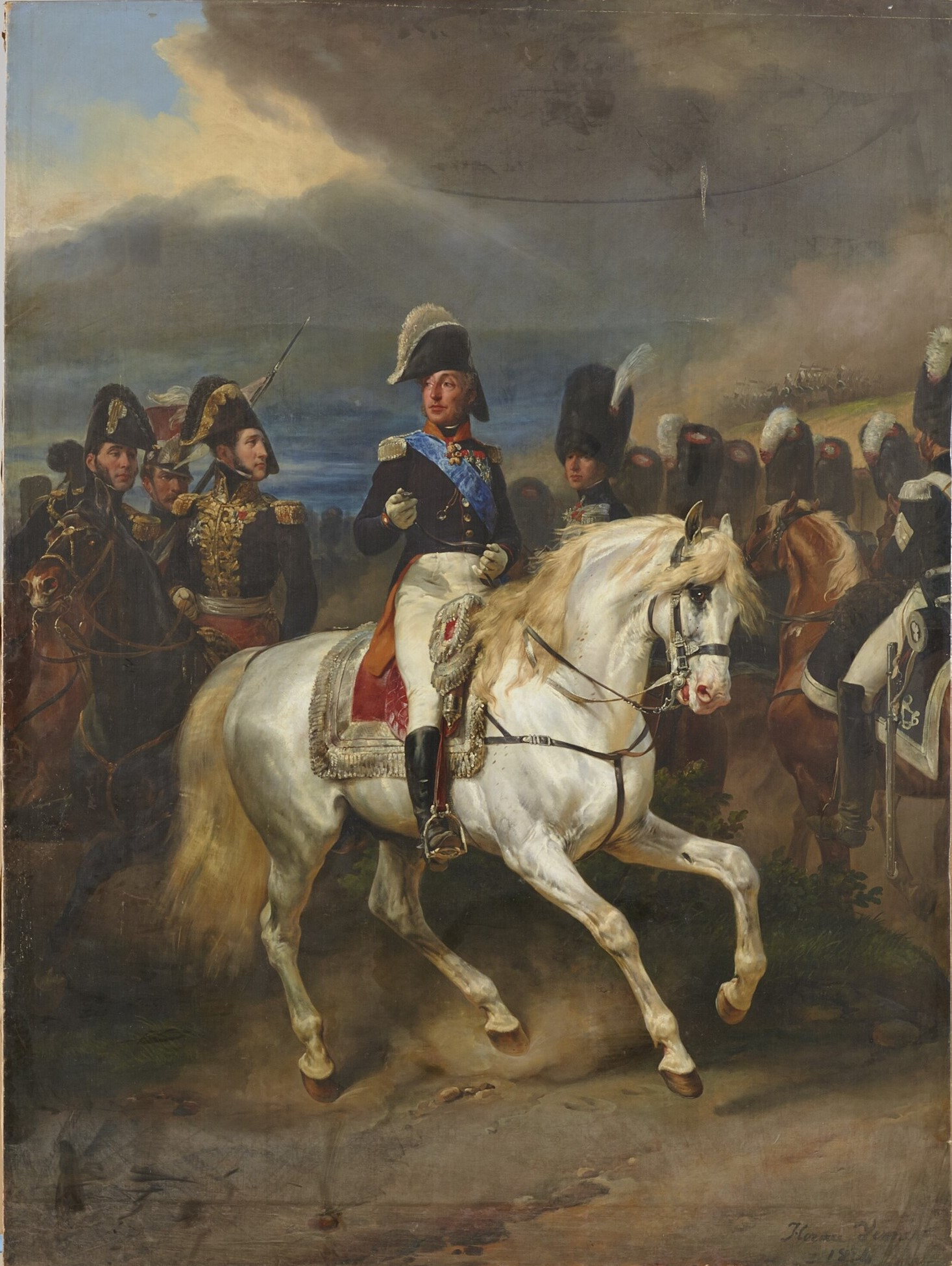
Portrait of the Duke of Angoulême, 1824

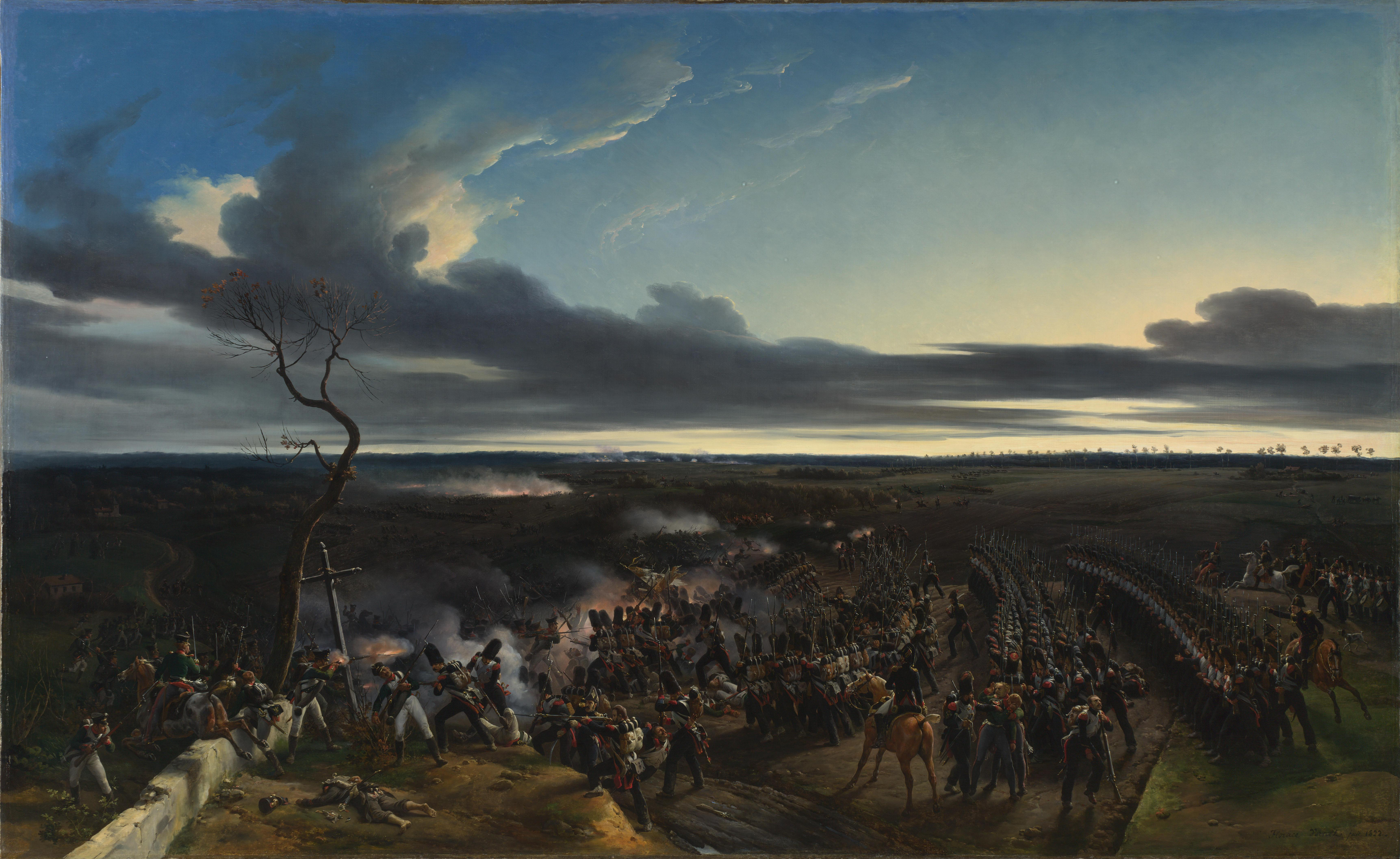
The Battle of Montmirail, 1824

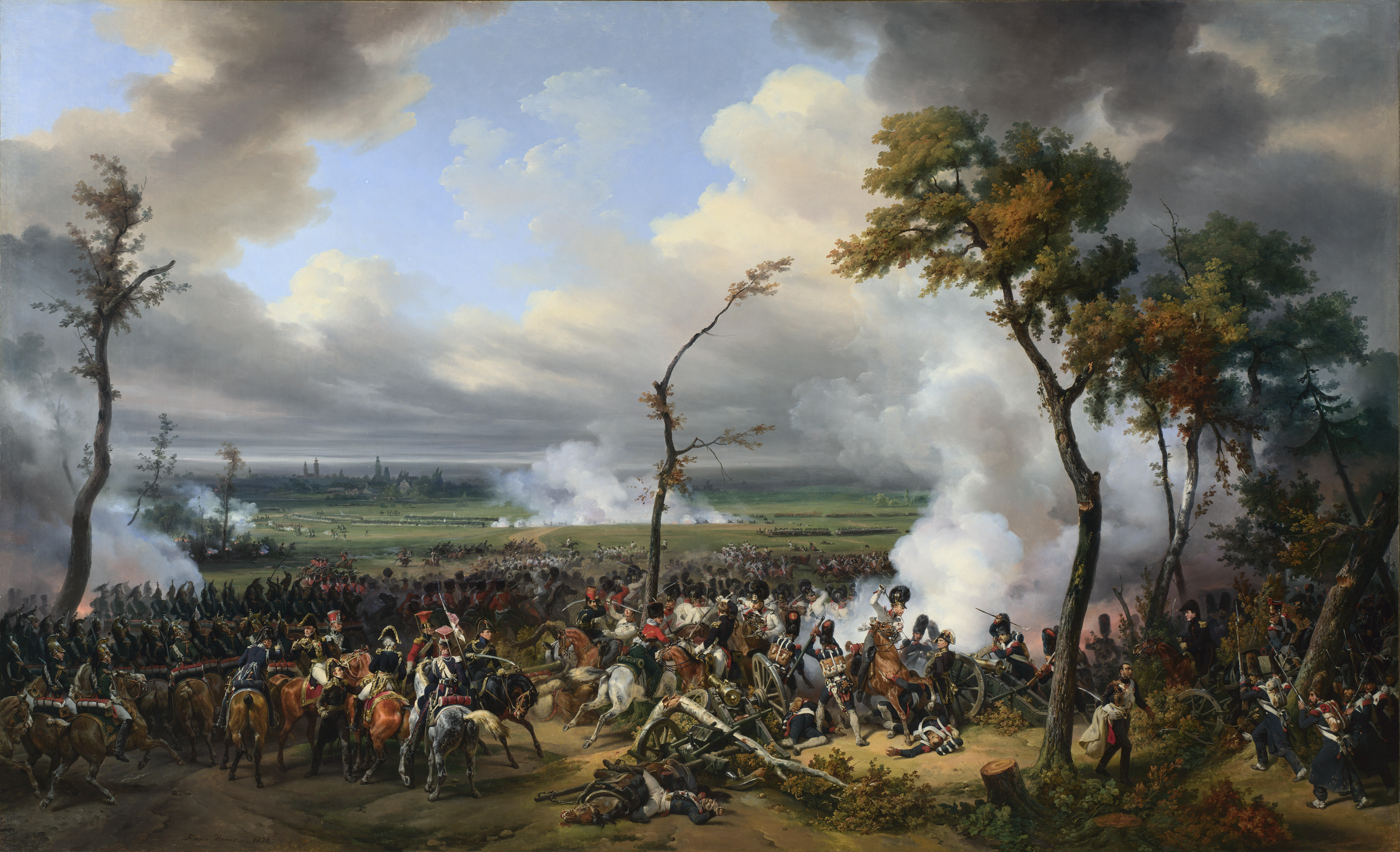
The Battle of Hanau, 1824

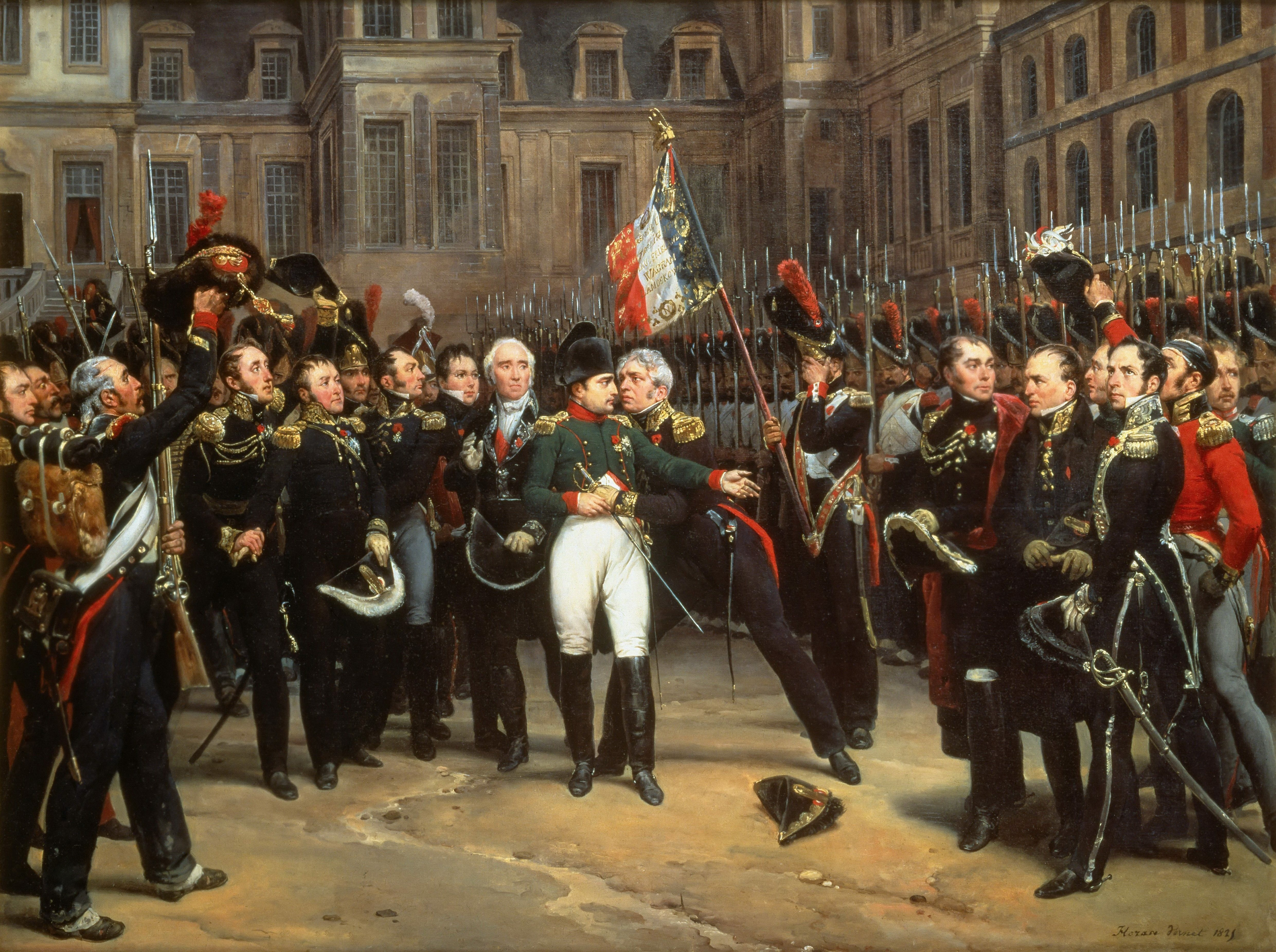
Napoleon Bids Farewell to His Guard, 1824

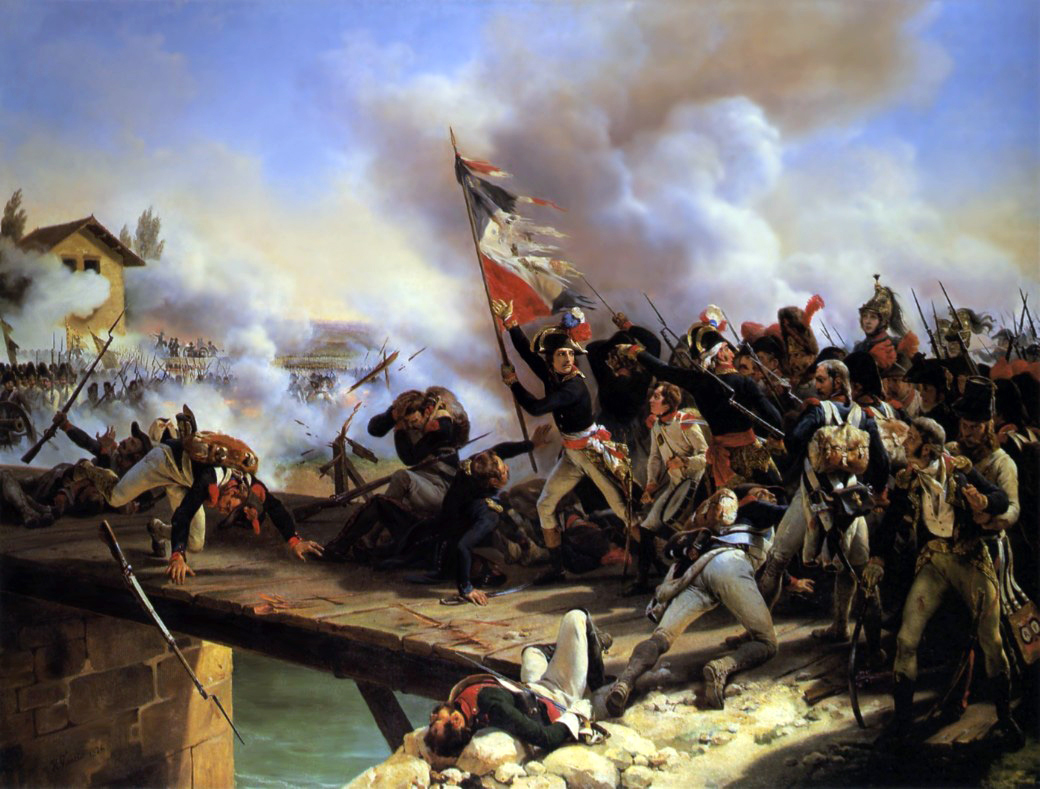
The Crossing of the Arcole Bridge, 1826

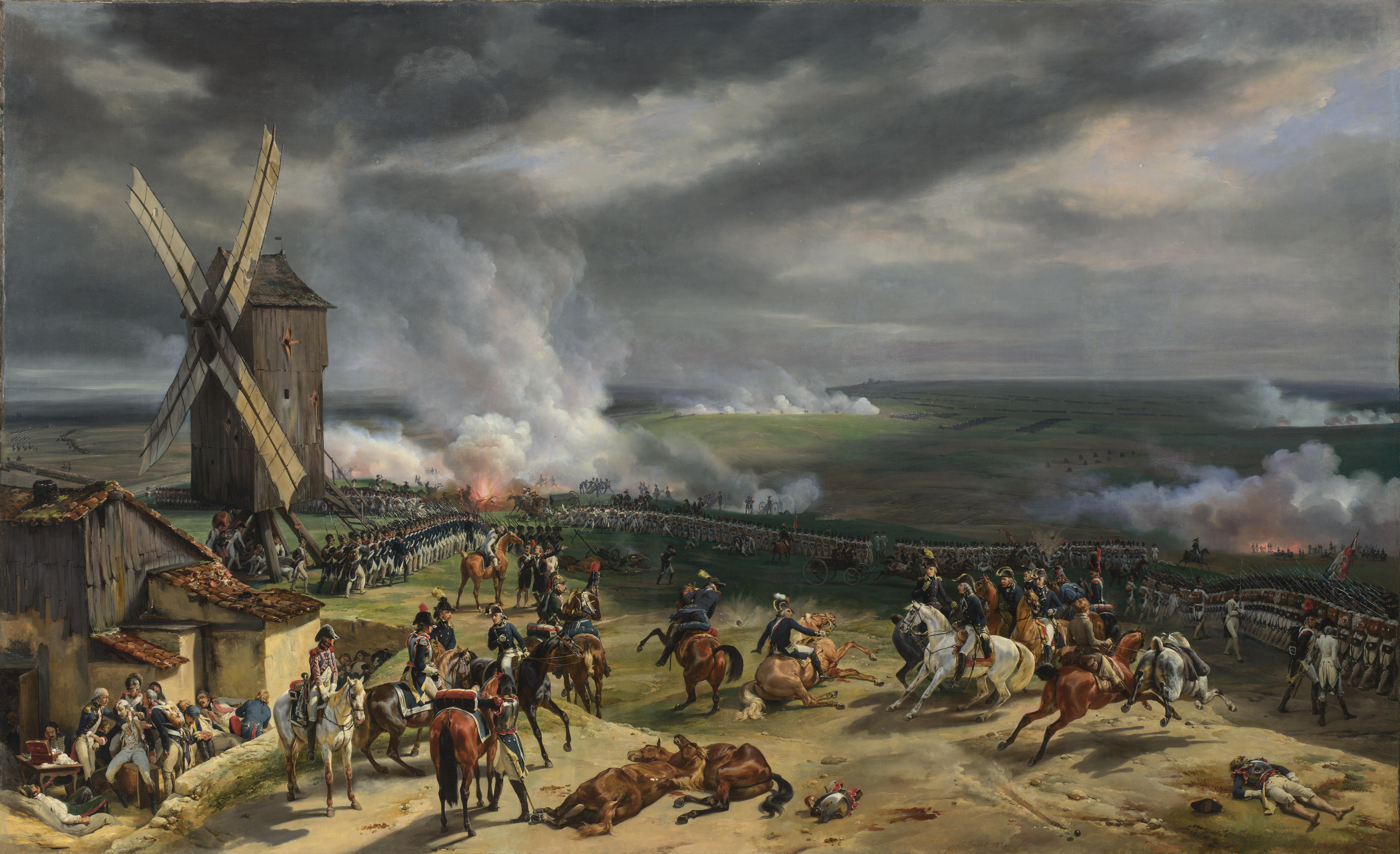
The Battle of Valmy, 1826

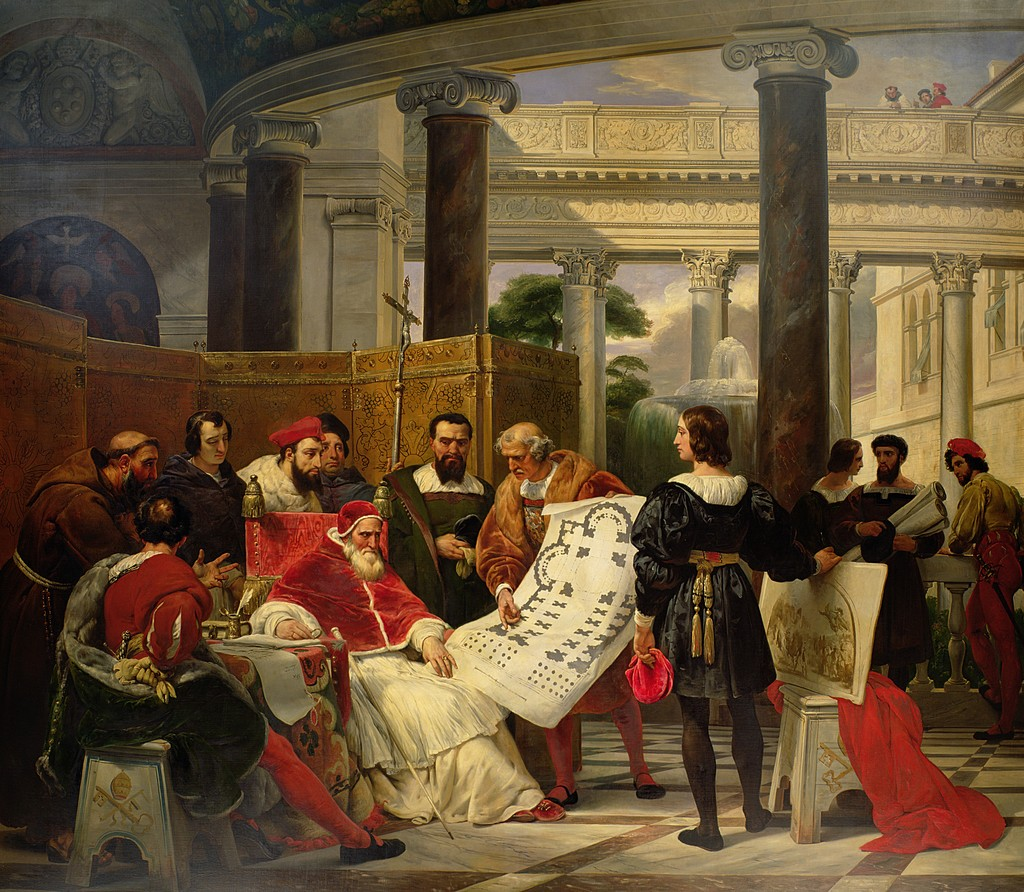
Pope Julius II ordering Bramante and Michelangelo to design St Peter's Basilica, 1827

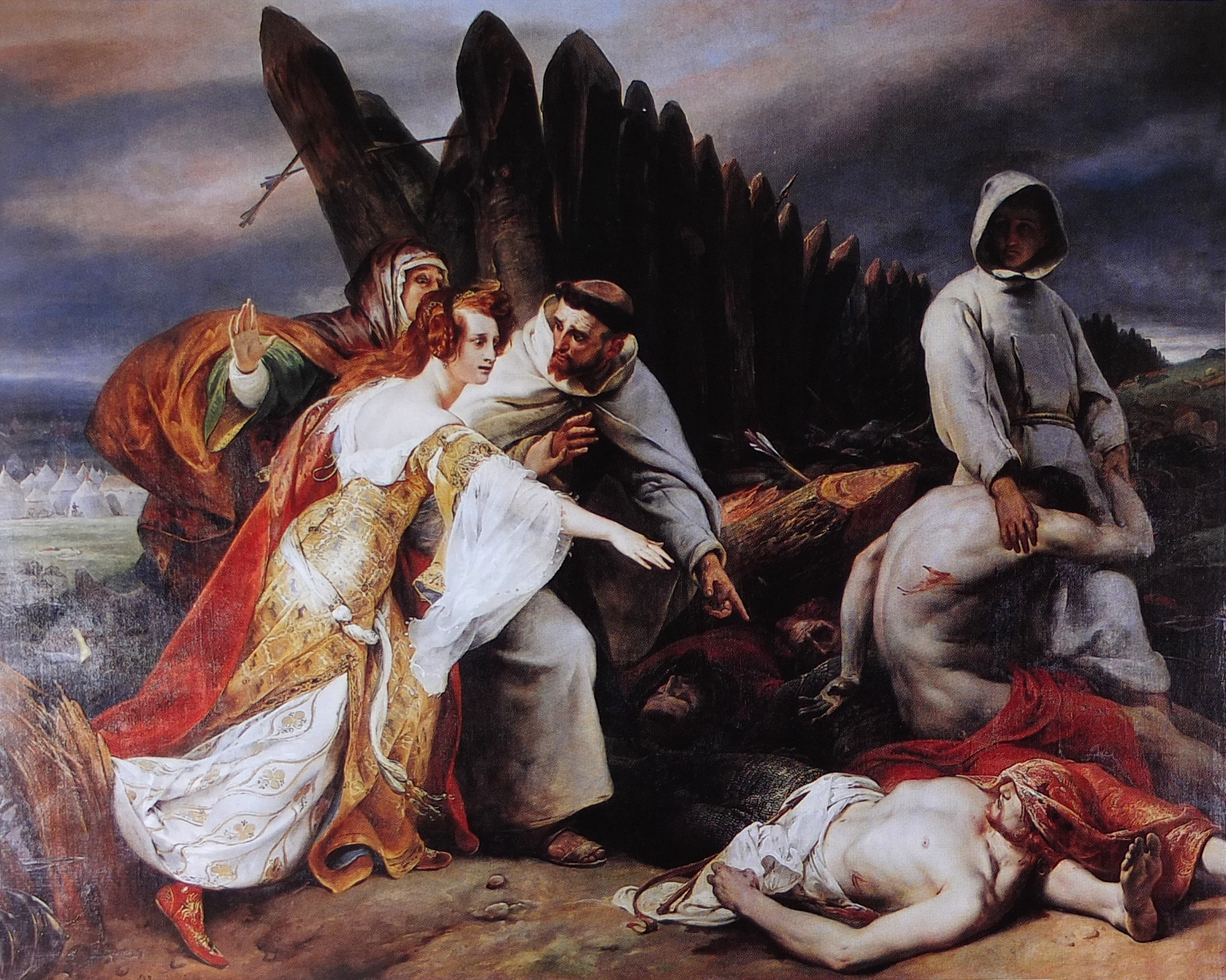
Edith Recovering Harold's Body after the Battle of Hastings, 1827

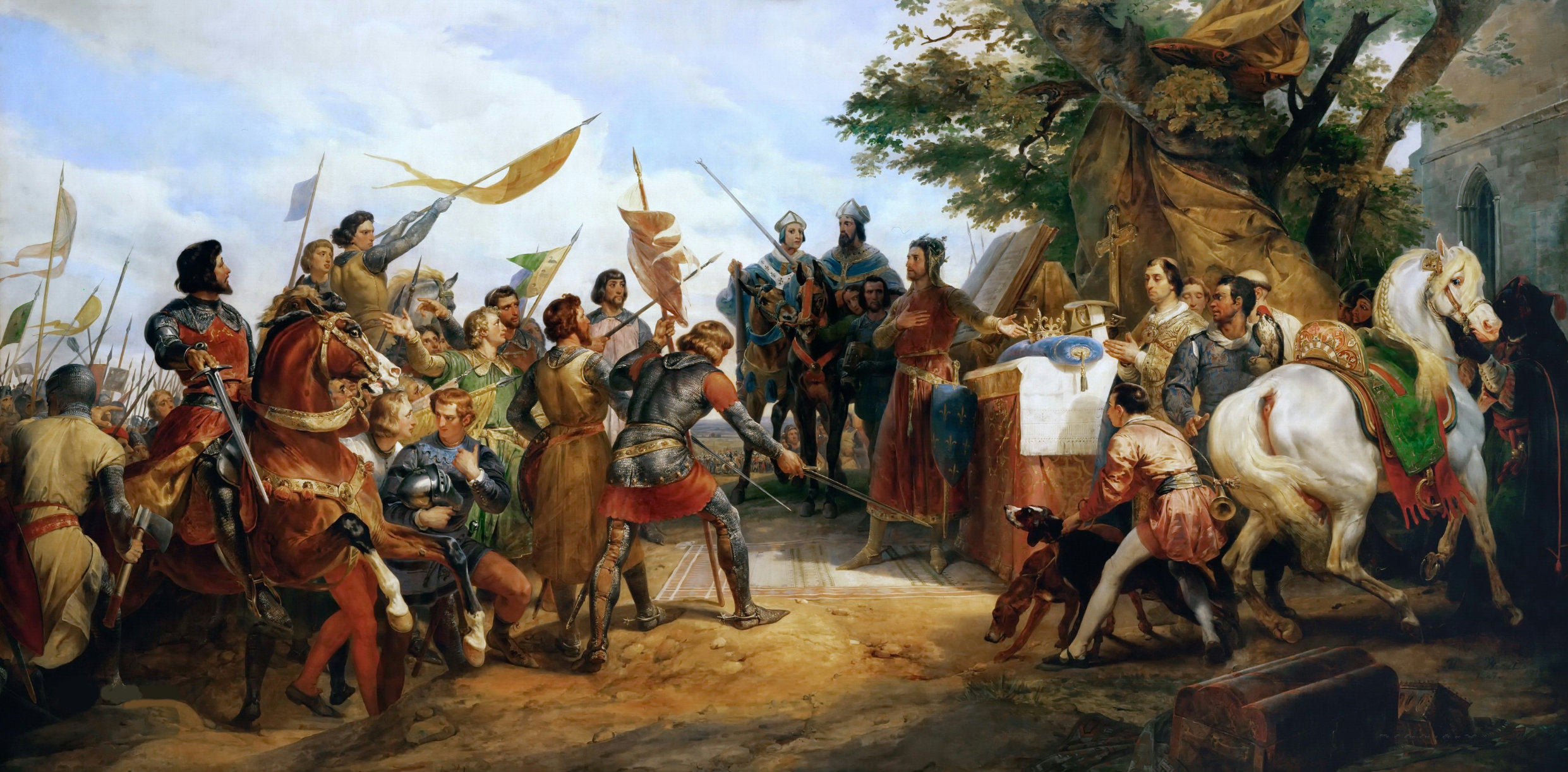
The Battle of Bouvines, 1827

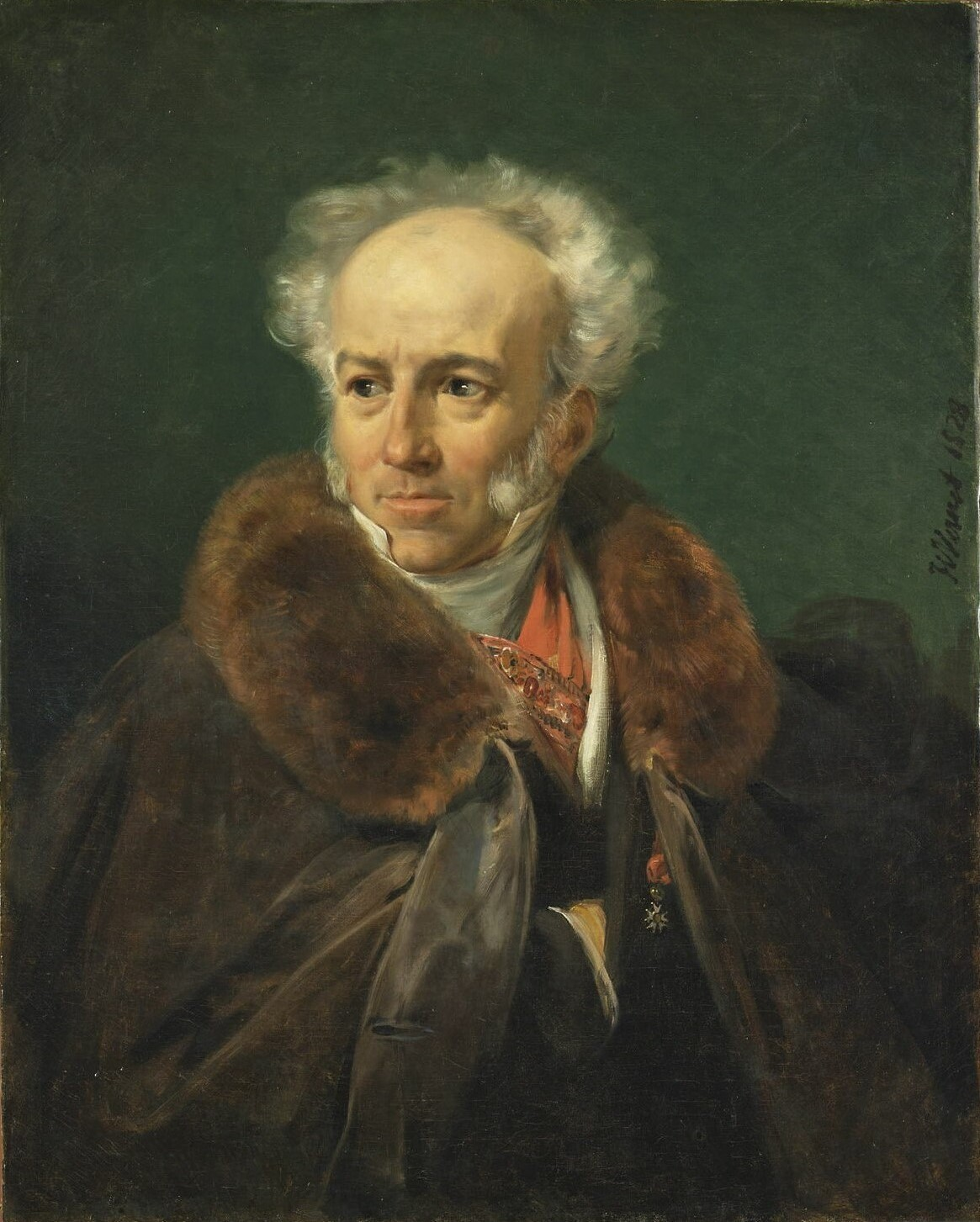
Portrait of Jean-Baptiste Isabey, 1828

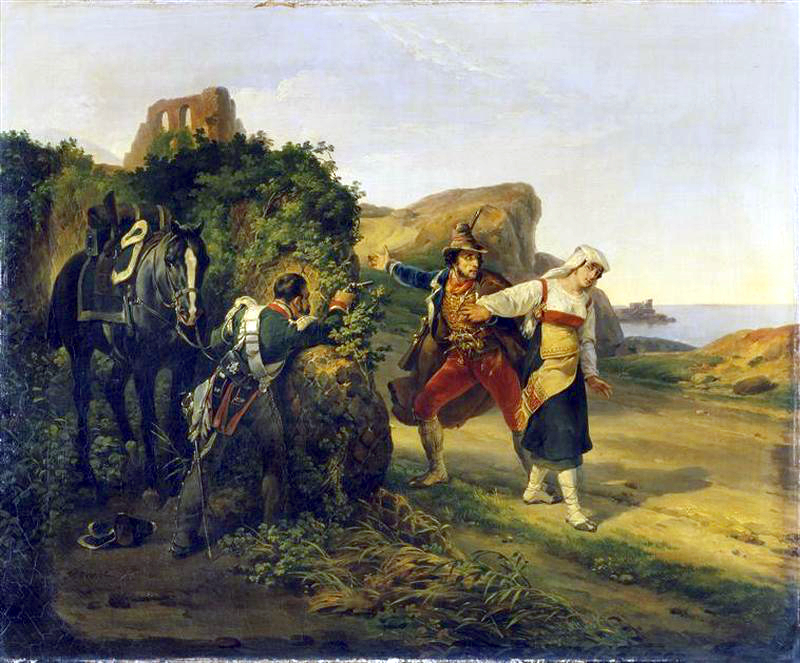
The Brigand Betrayed, 1828

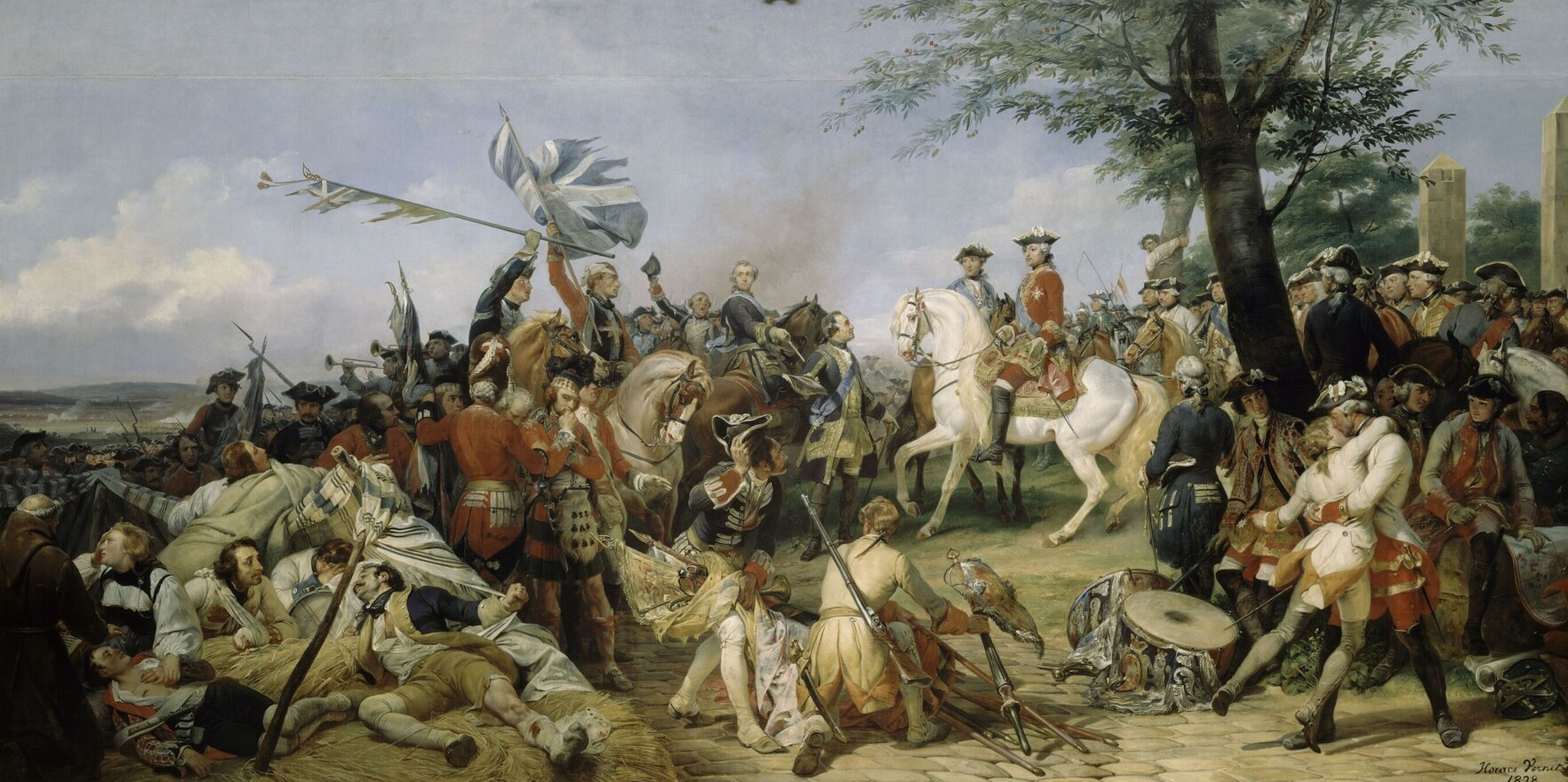
The Battle of Fontenoy, 1828

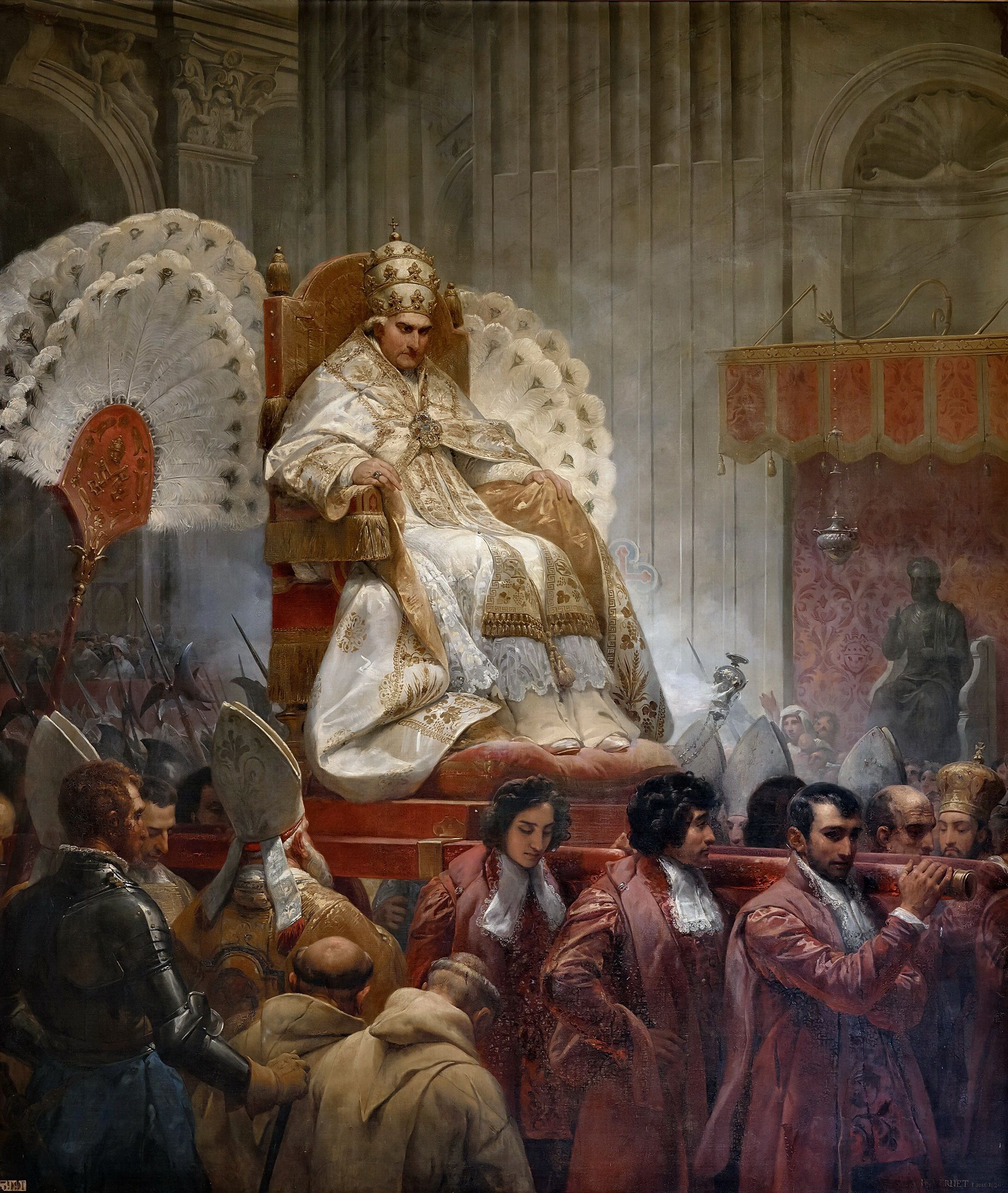
Pope Pius VIII brought to the Basilica of Saint Peter in Rome, 1829

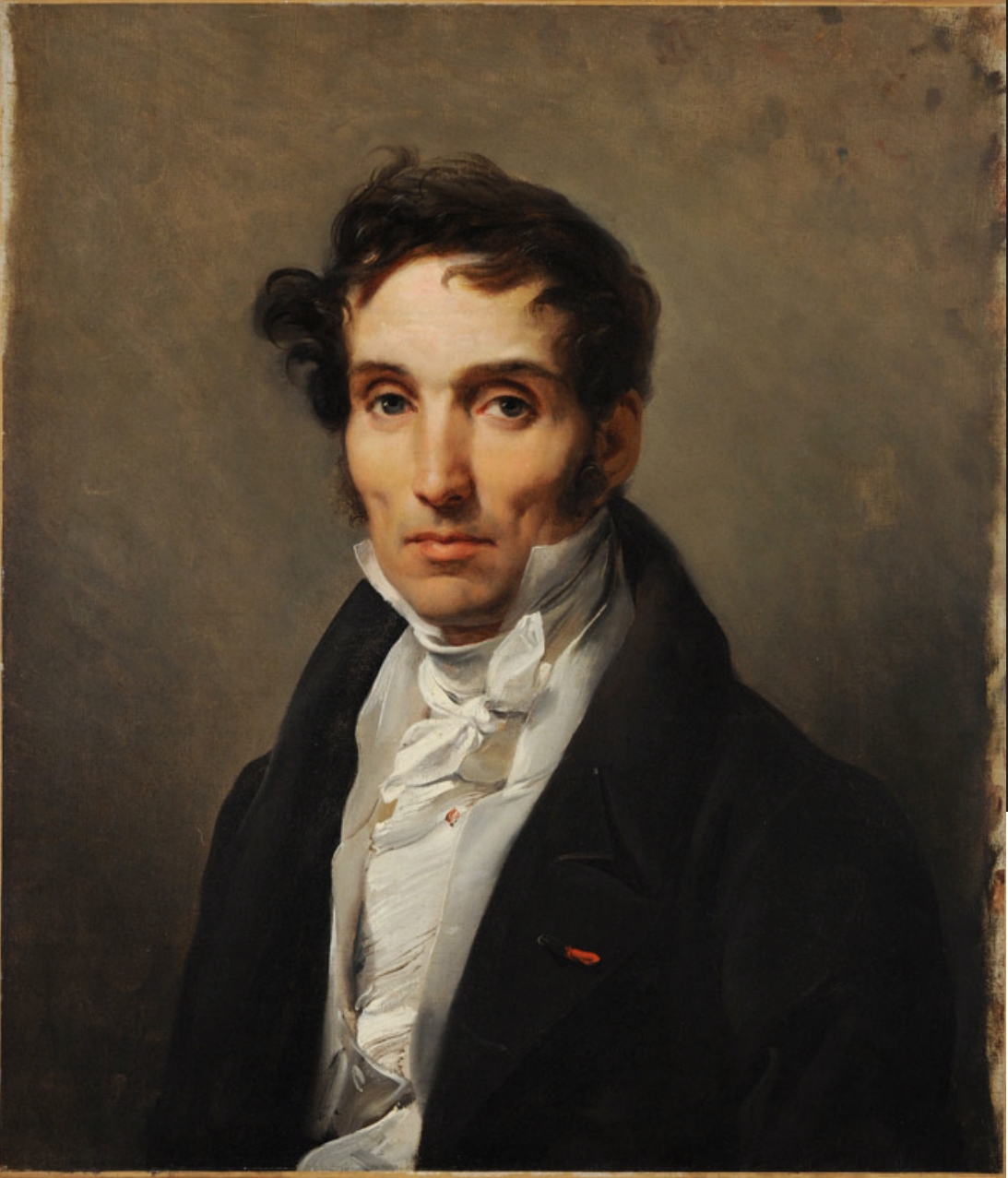
Pierre-Narcisse Guérin, 1829

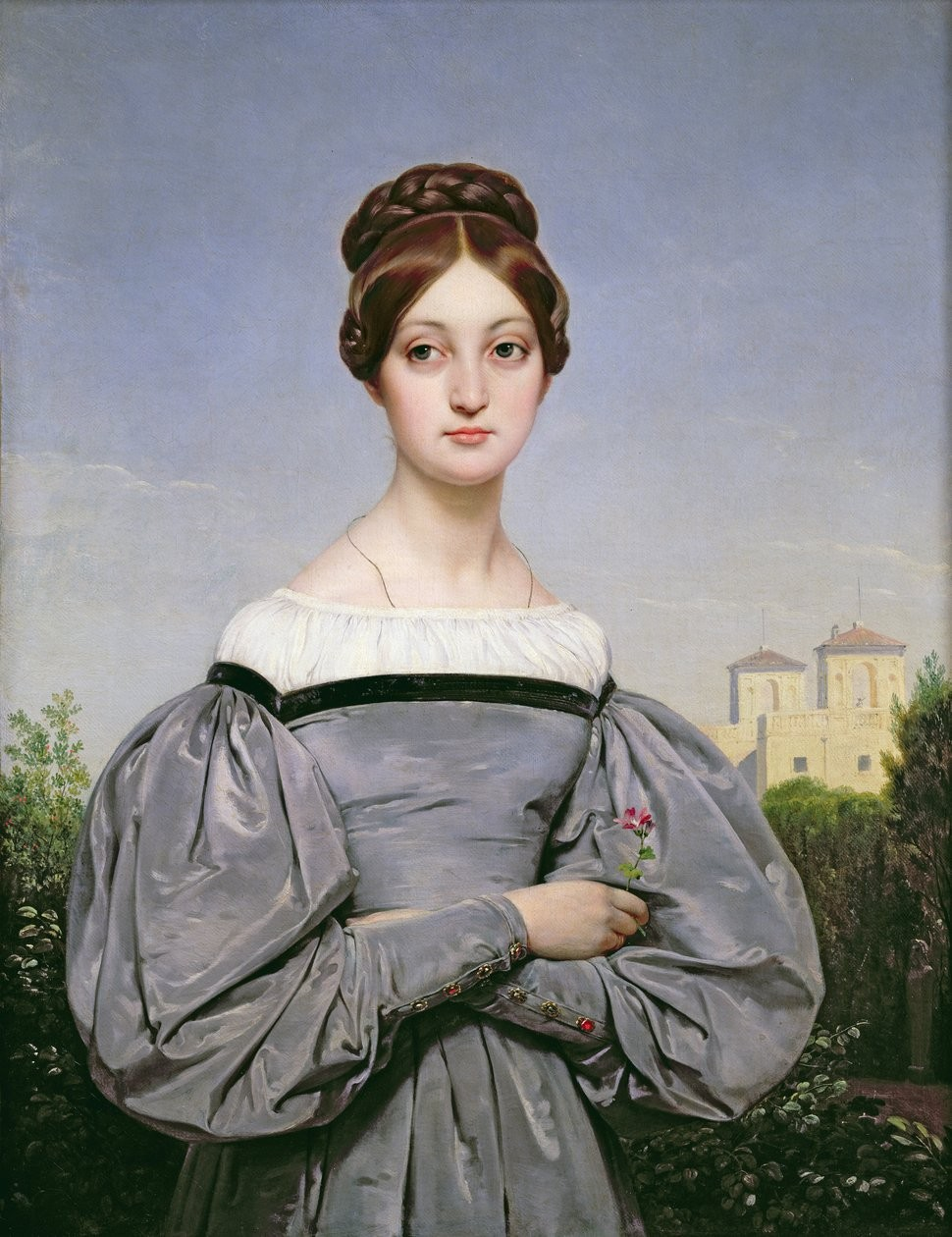
Portrait of Louise Vernet, 1830

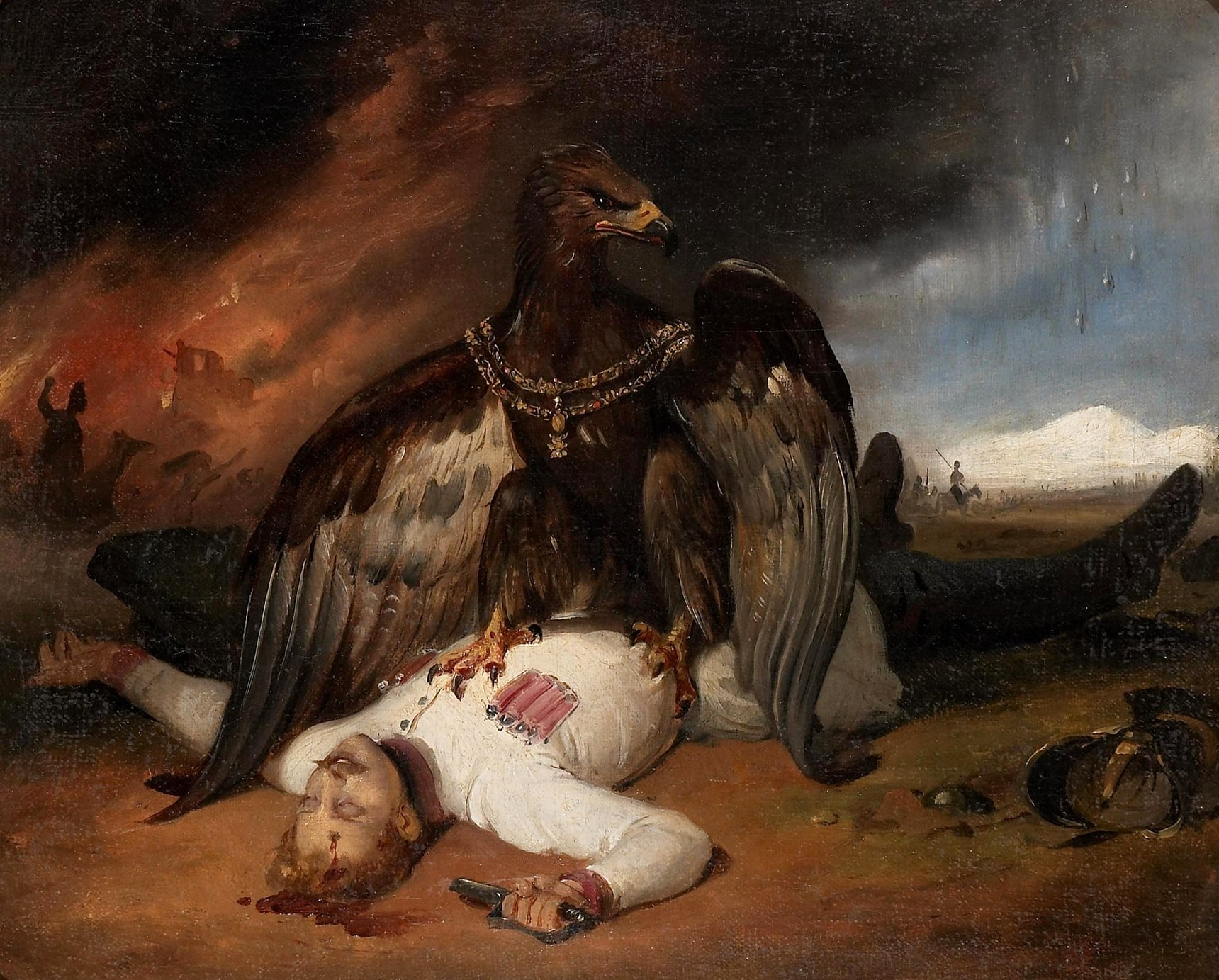
The Polish Prometheus, 1831

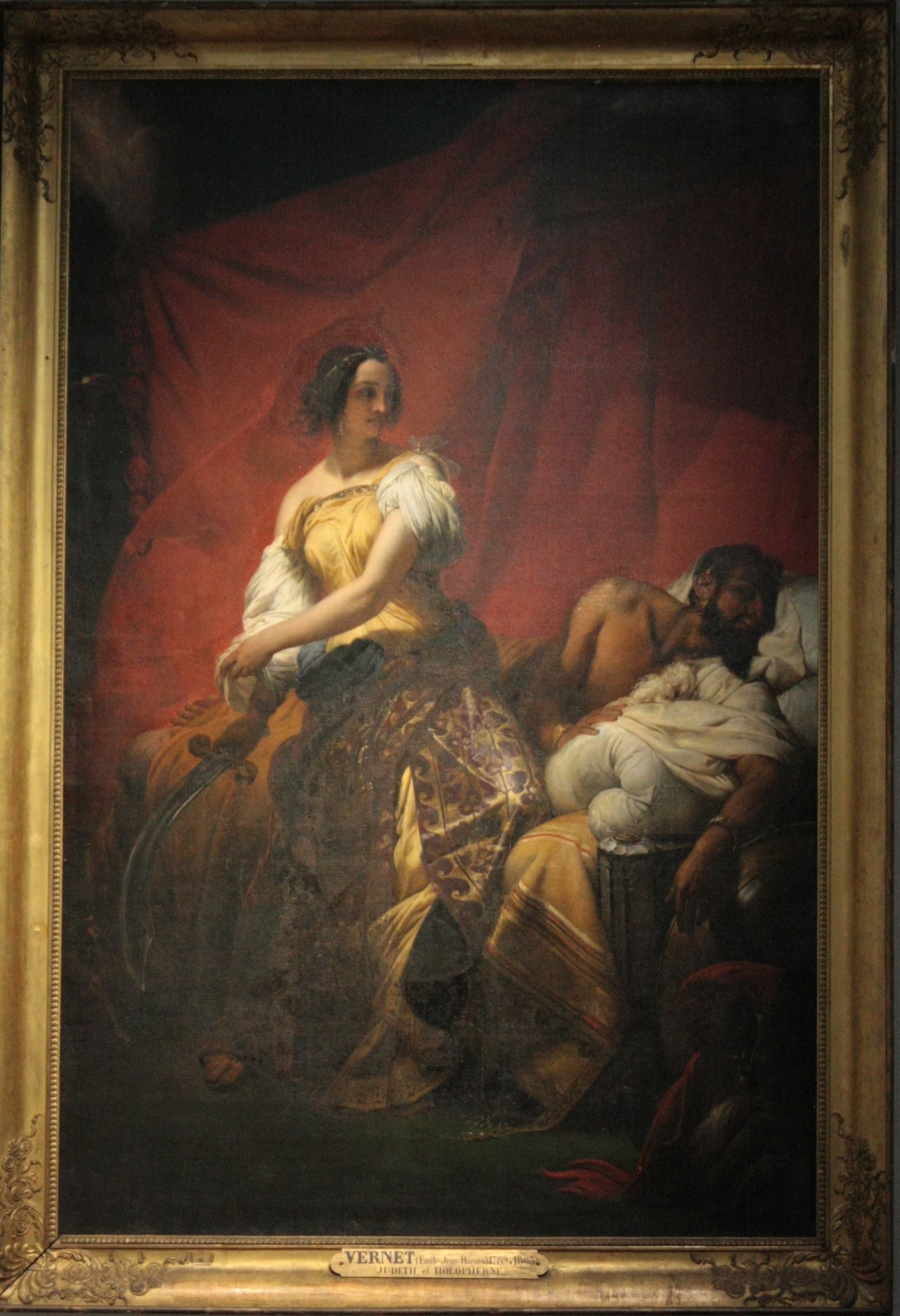
Judith et Holopherne, 1831

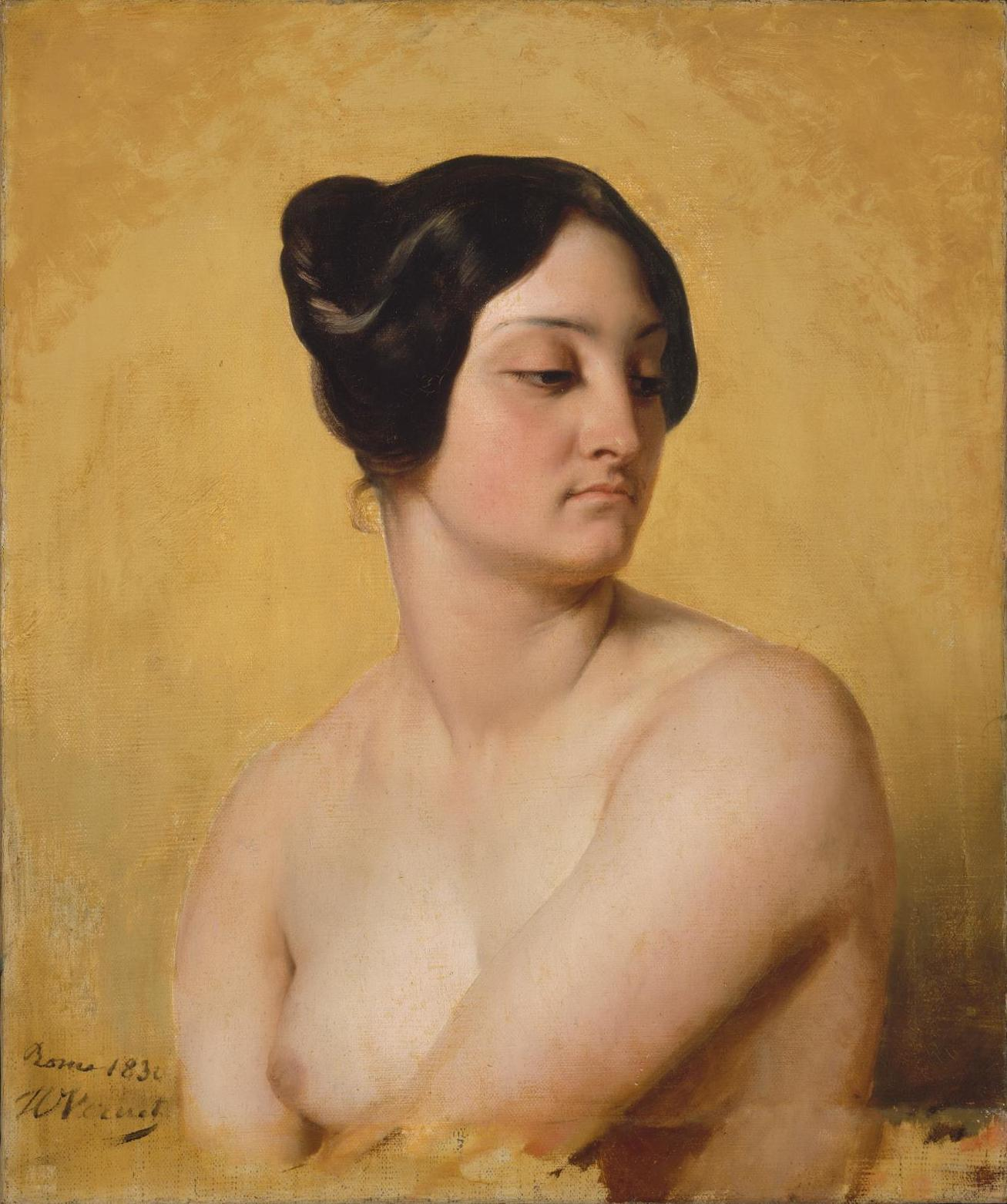
Study of Olympe Pelissier as Judith, 1831

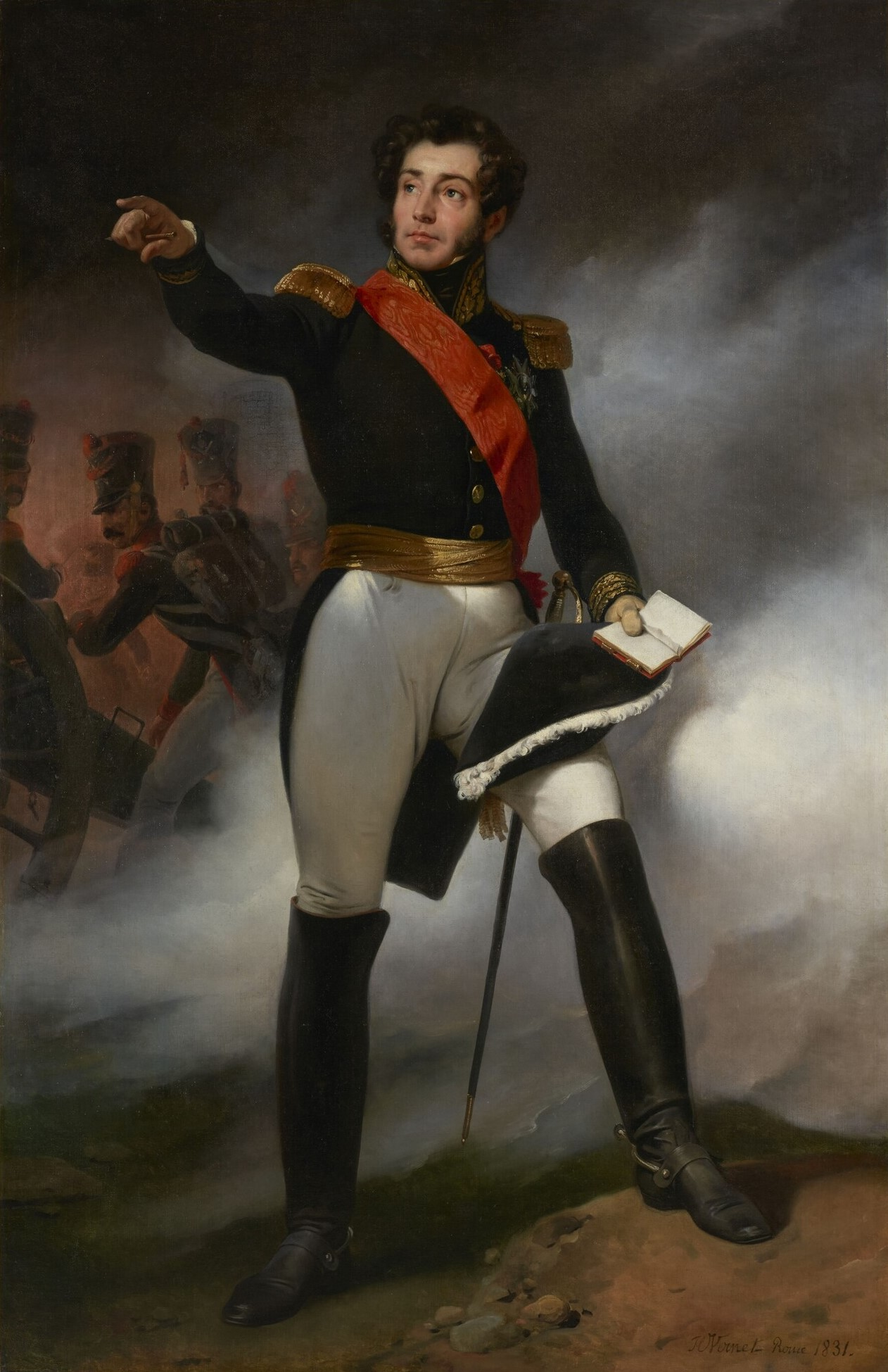
Portrait of Marshal Molitor, 1831

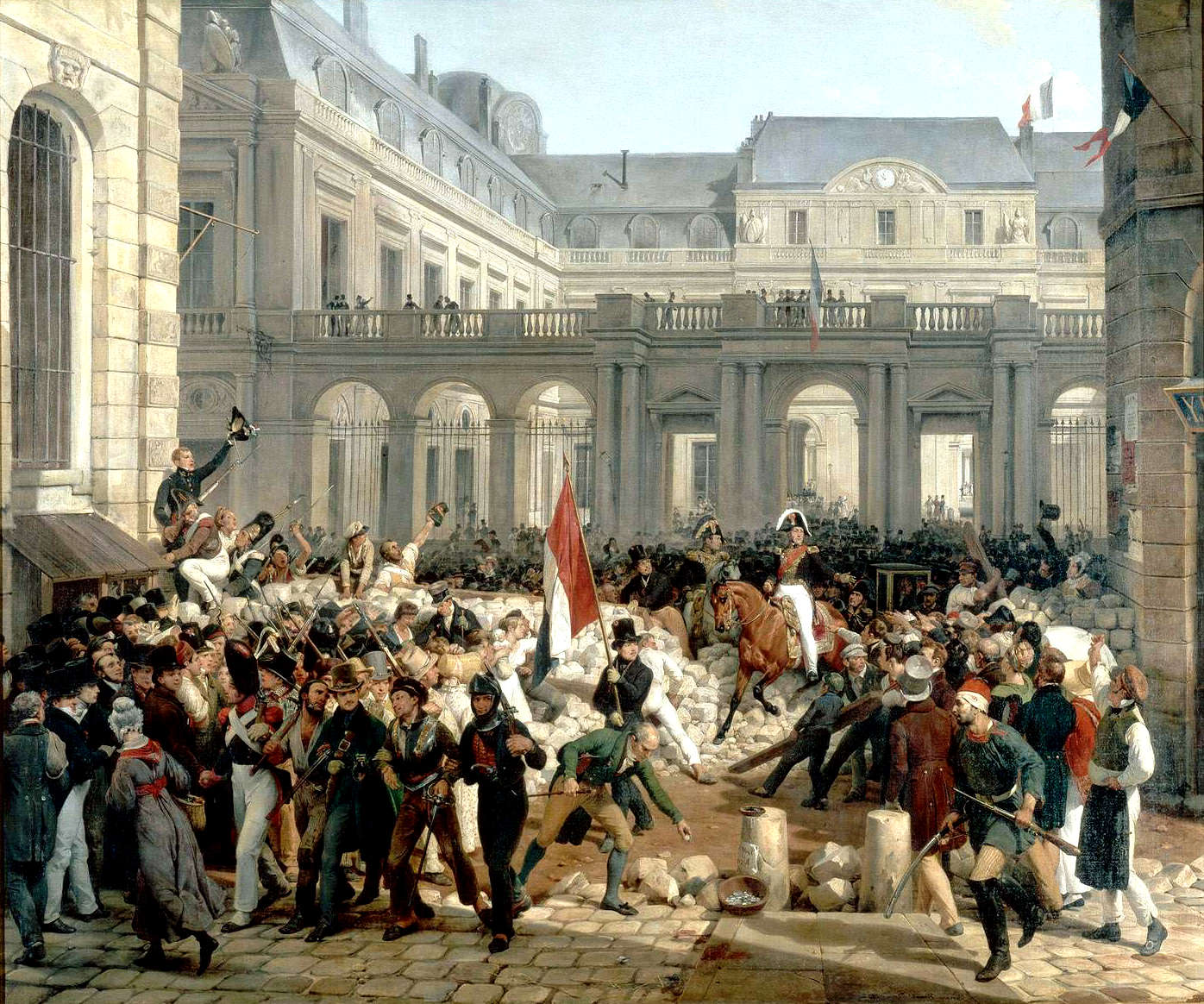
The Duke of Orleans Leaving the Palais-Royal, 1832

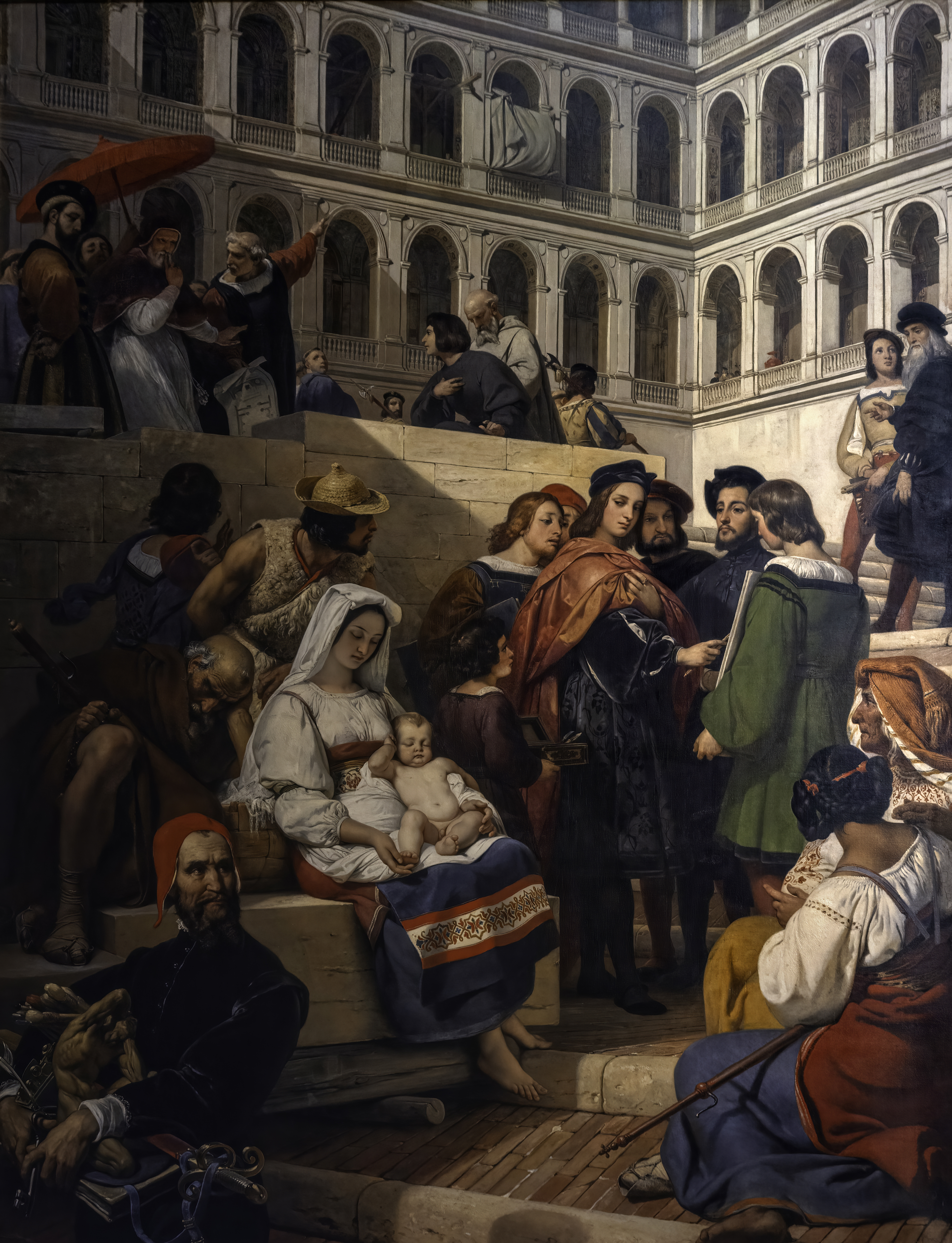
Raphael at the Vatican, 1832

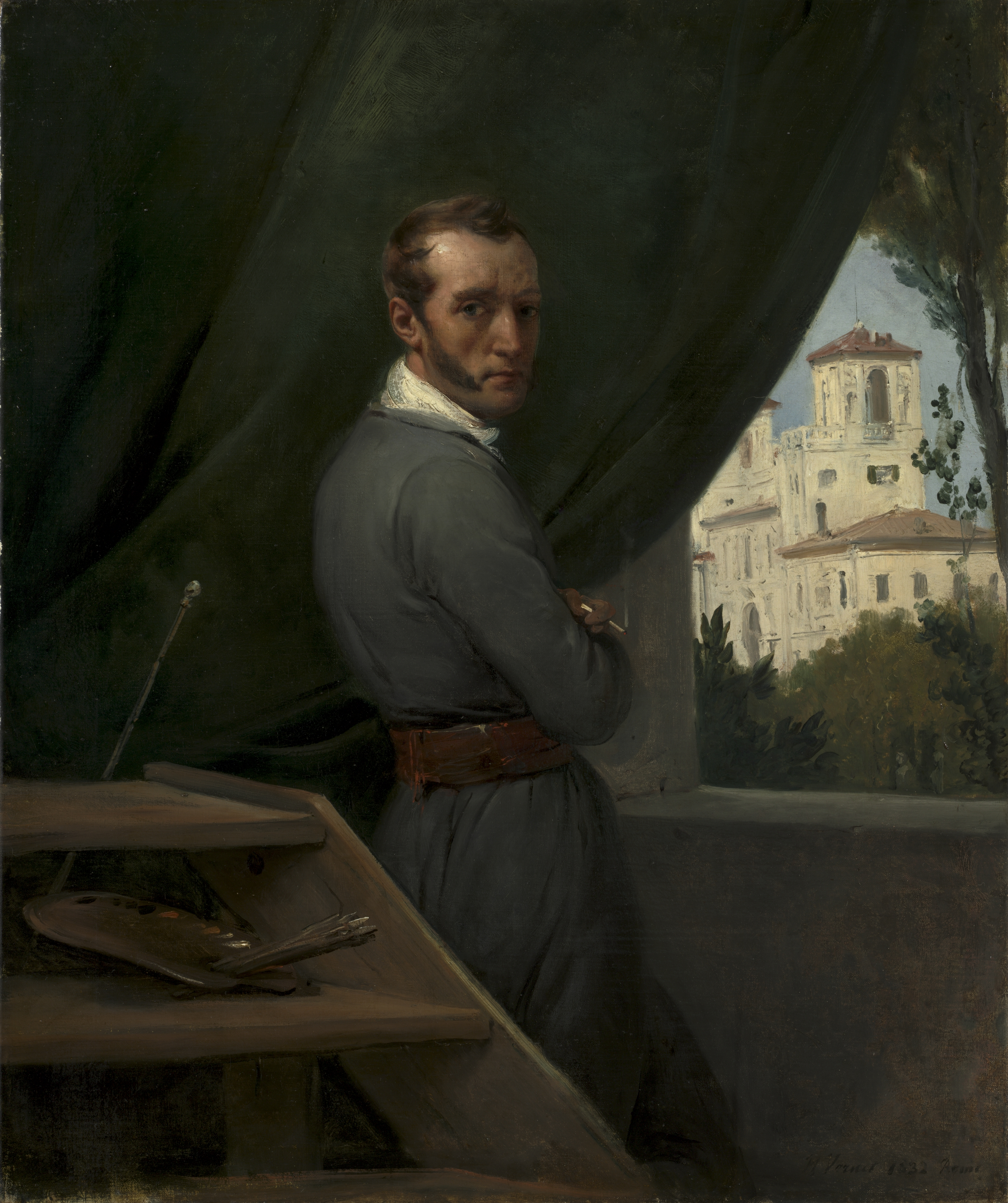
Self-Portrait in Rome, 1832

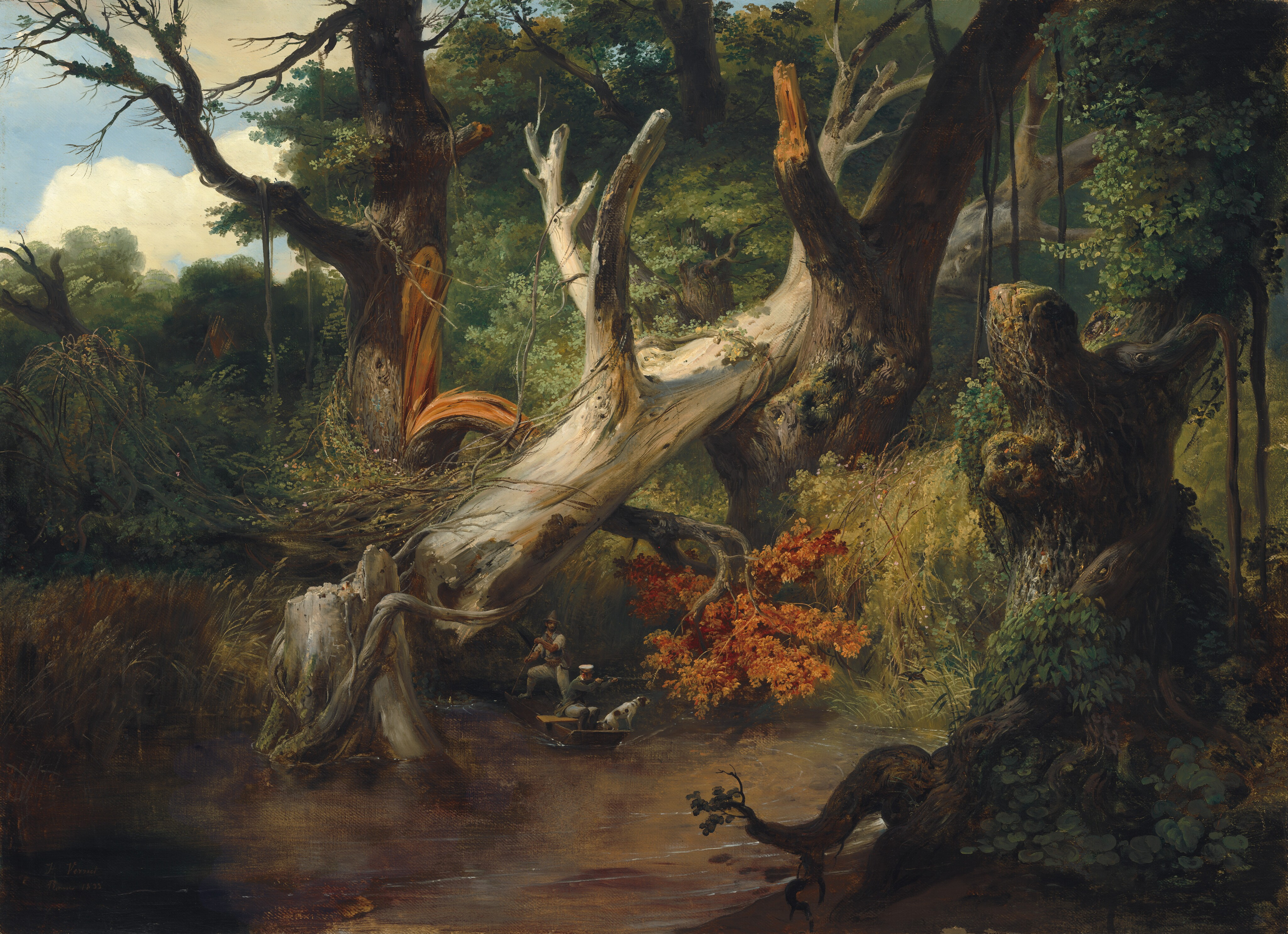
Hunting in the Pontine Marshes, 1833

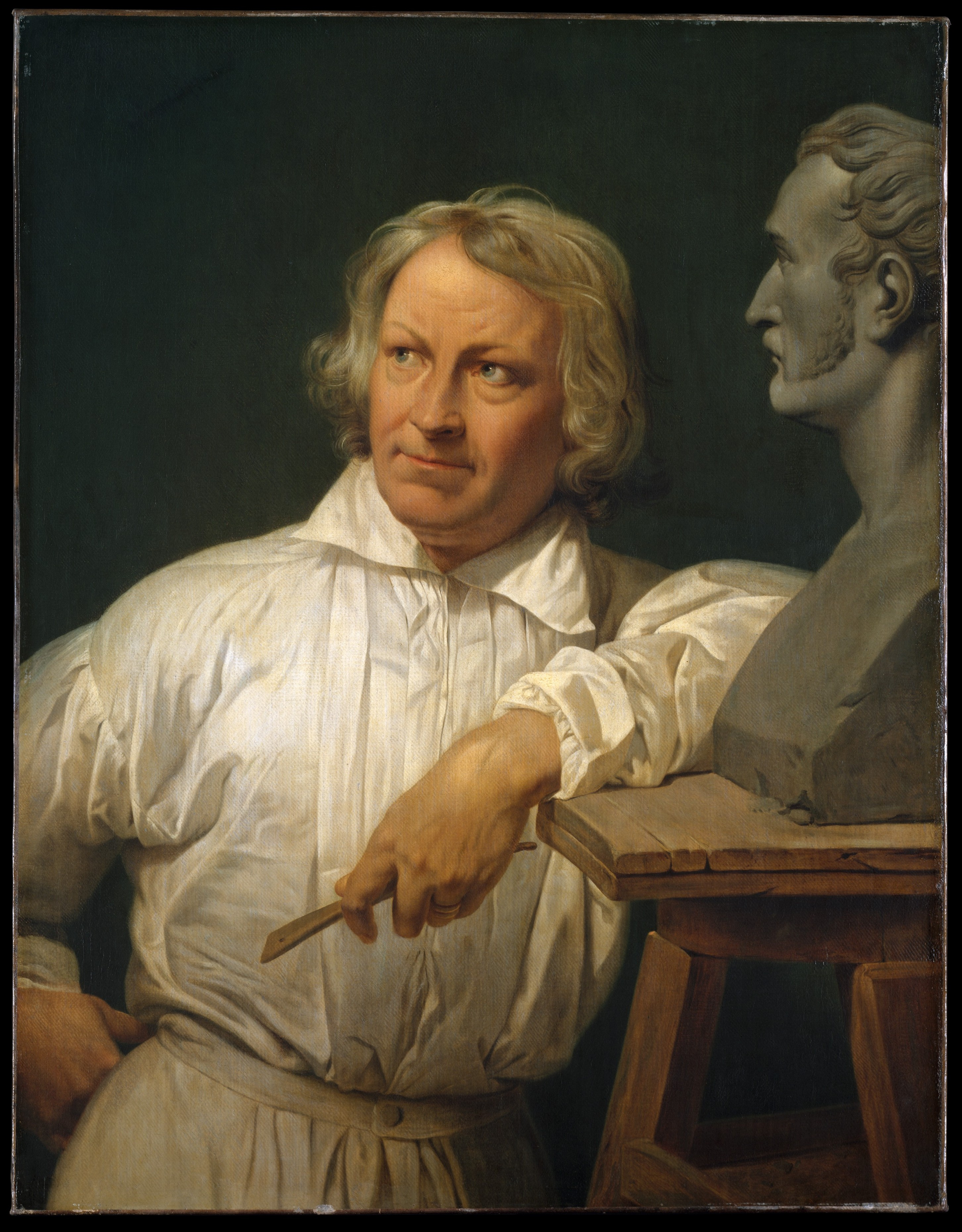
Portrait of Bertel Thorvaldsen, 1833

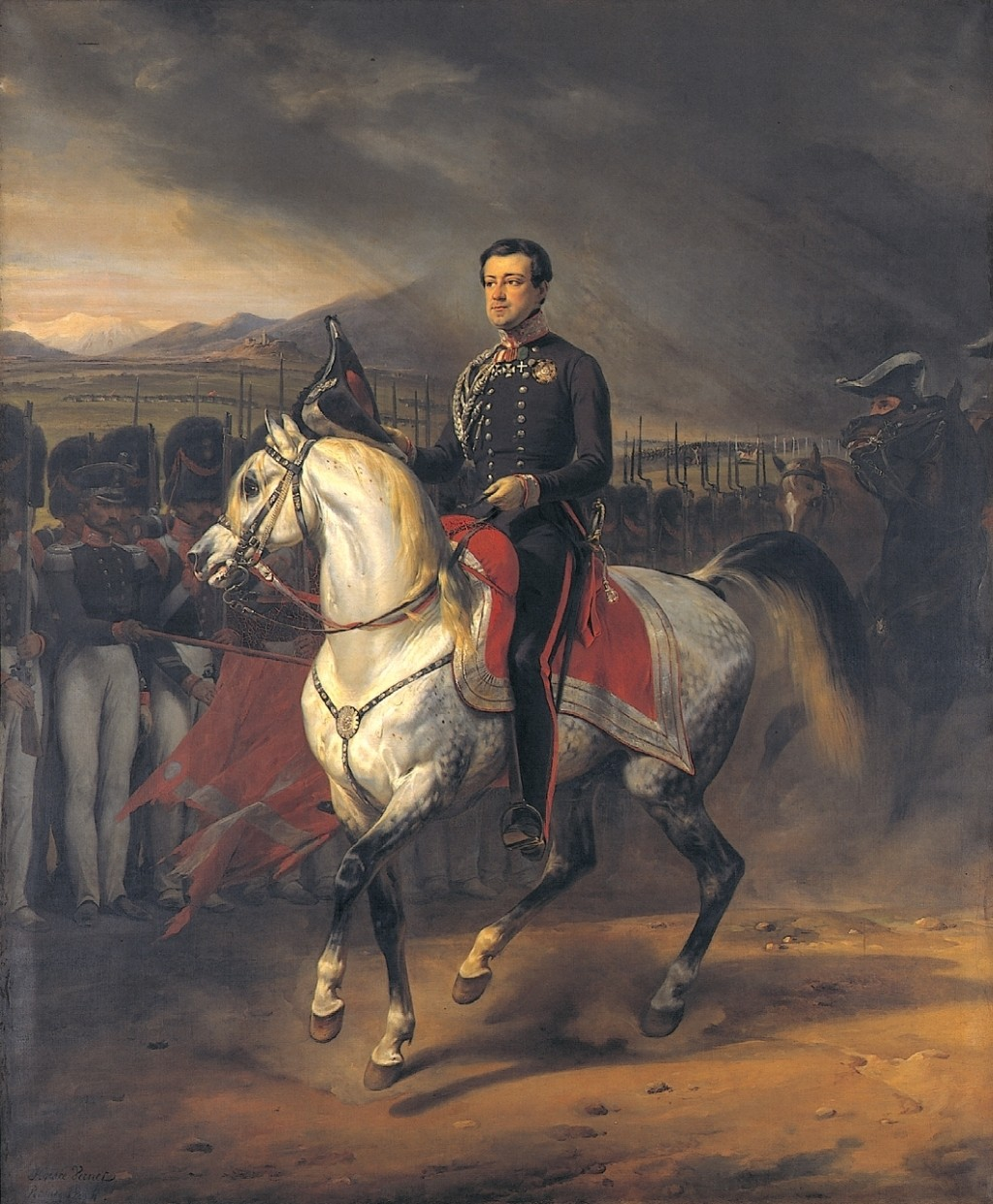
Carlo Alberto of Savoy, 1834

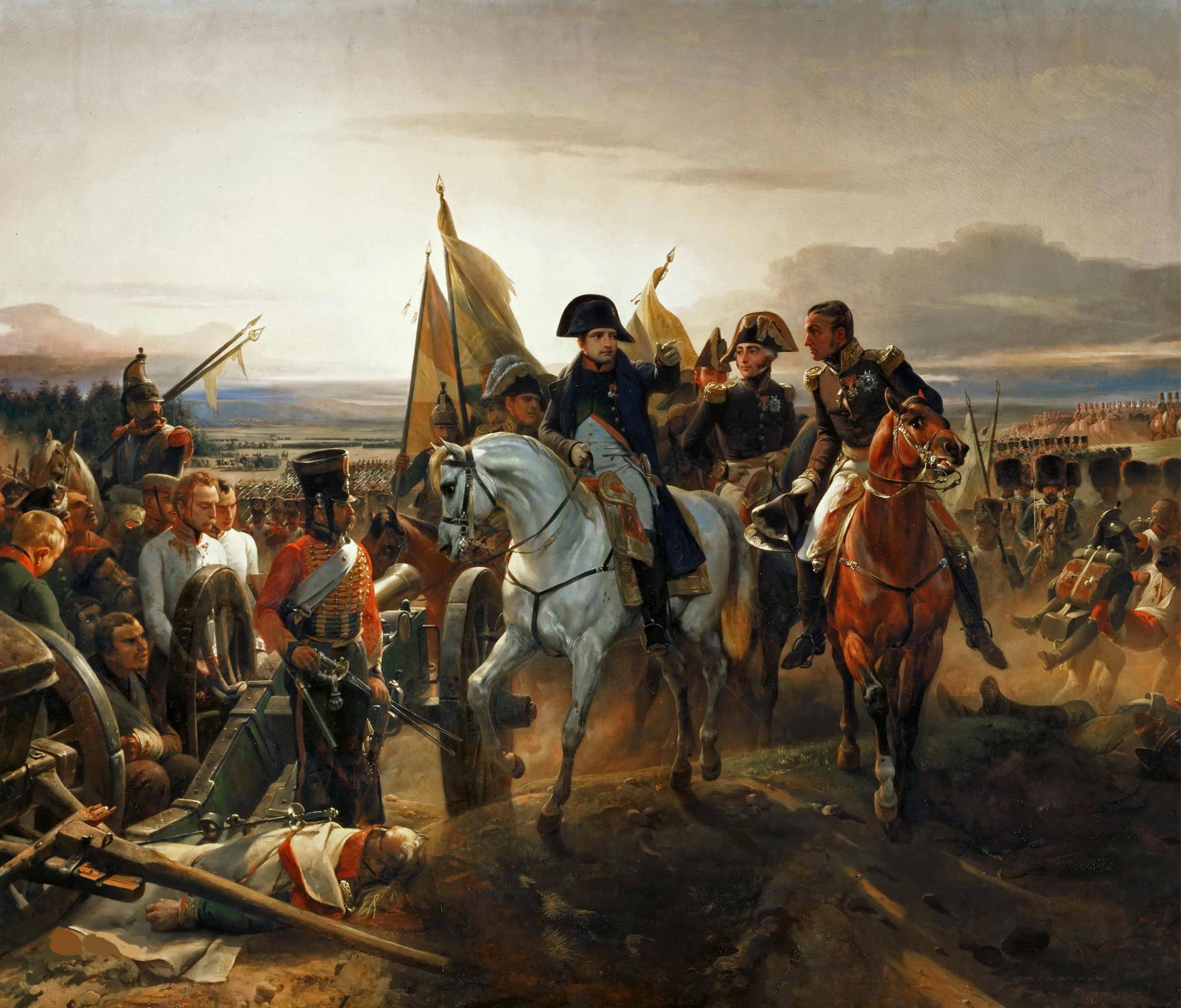
The Battle of Friedland, 1835

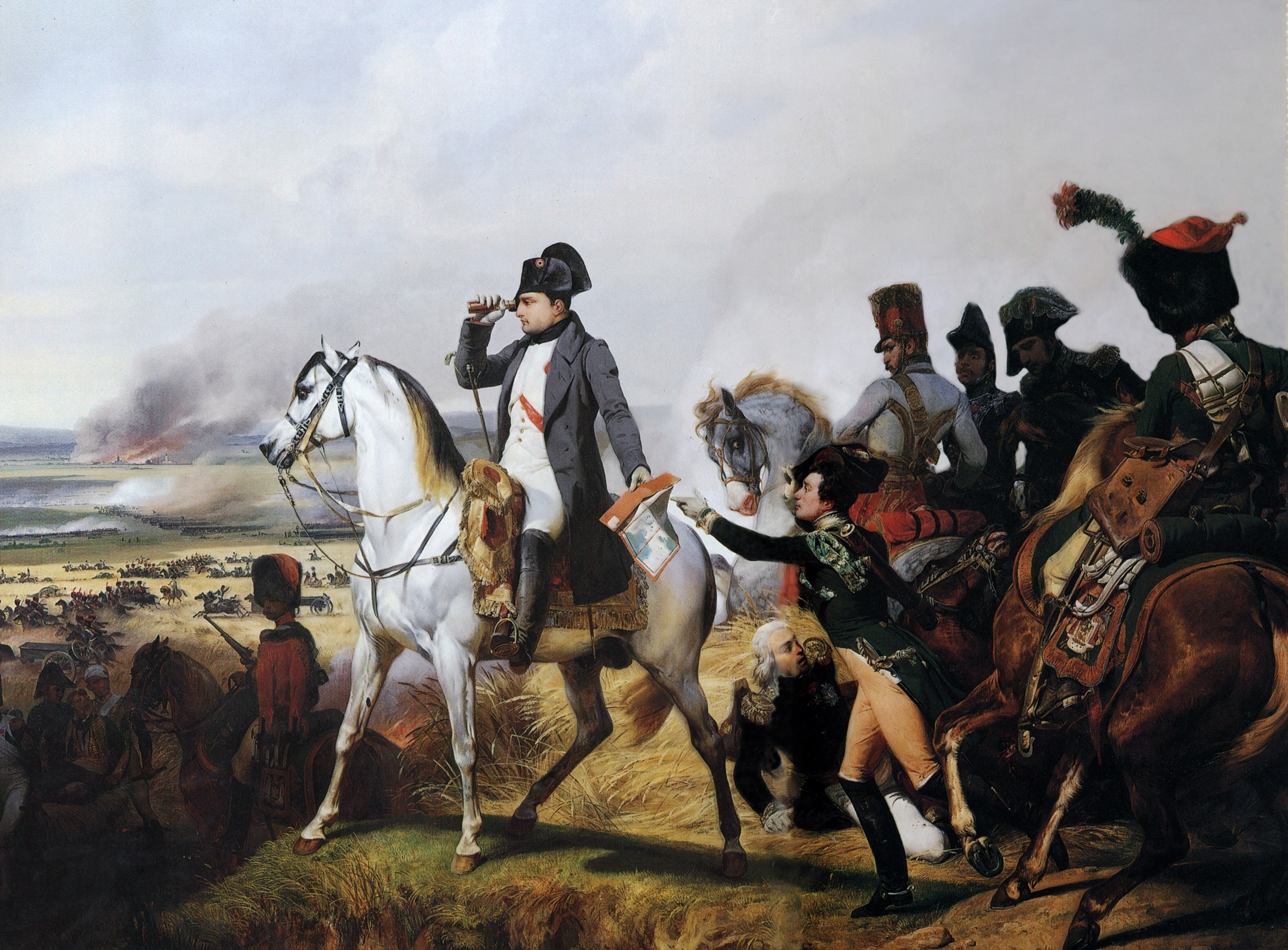
The Battle of Wagram, 1835

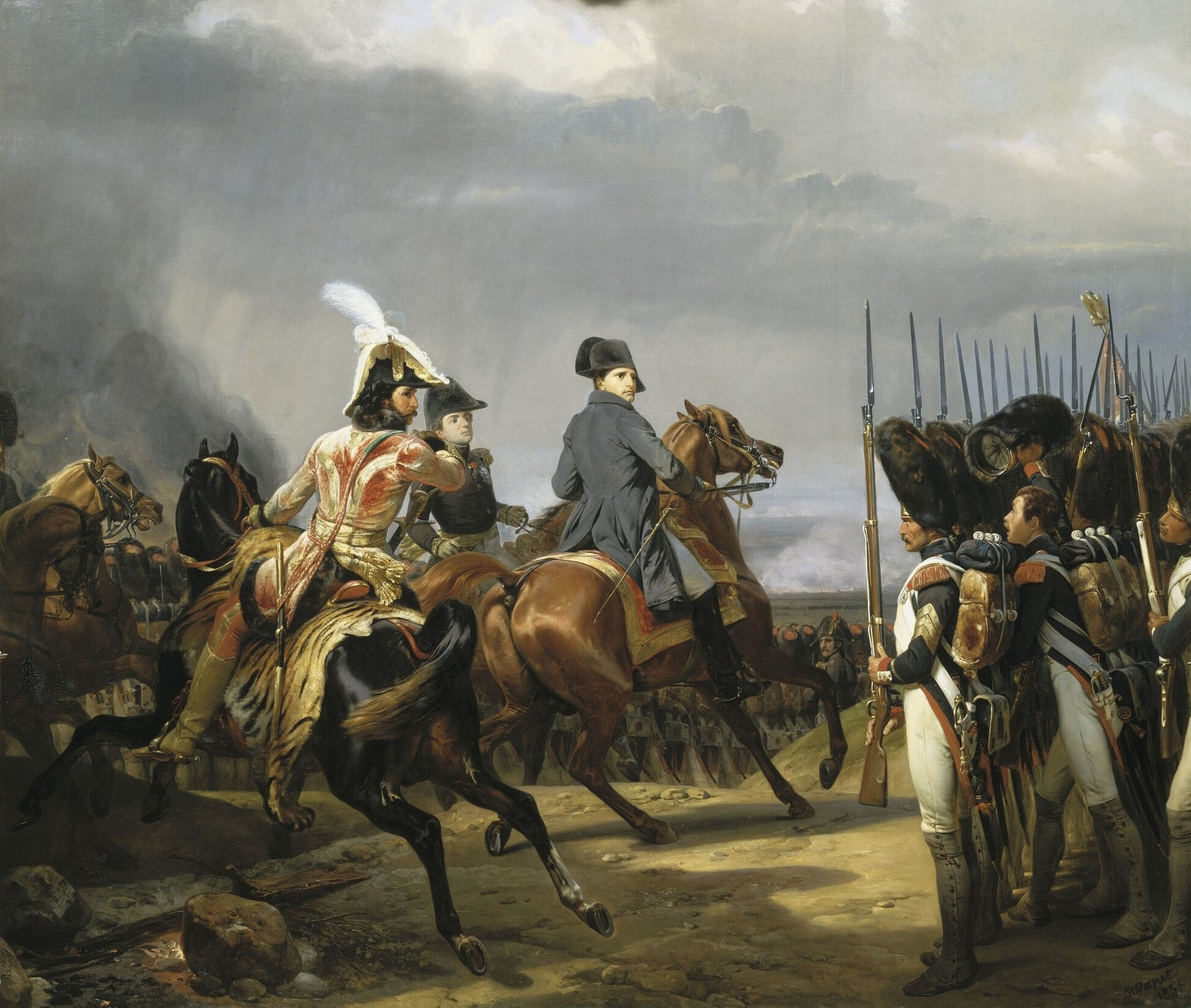
The Battle of Jena, 1836

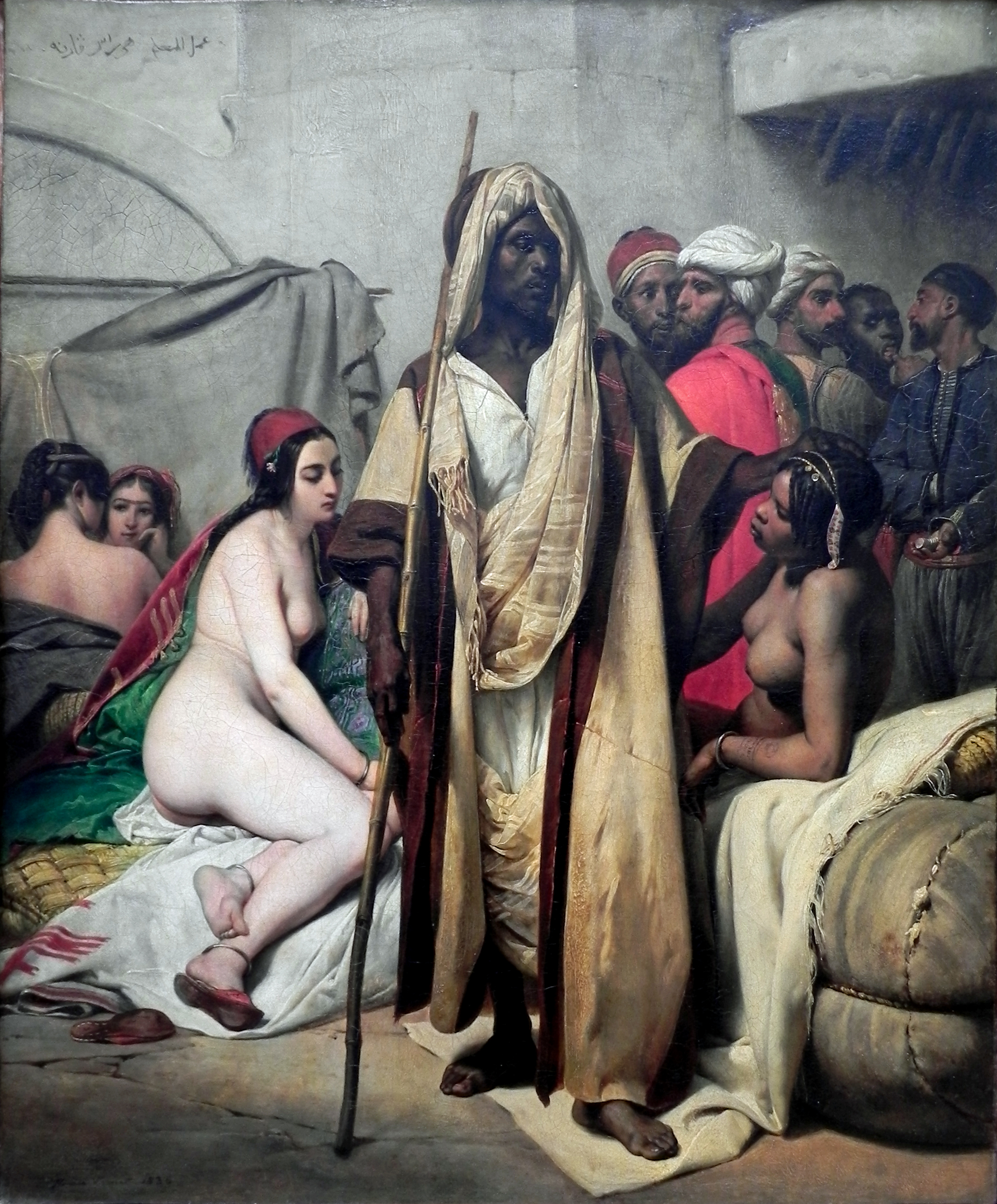
The Slave Market, 1836

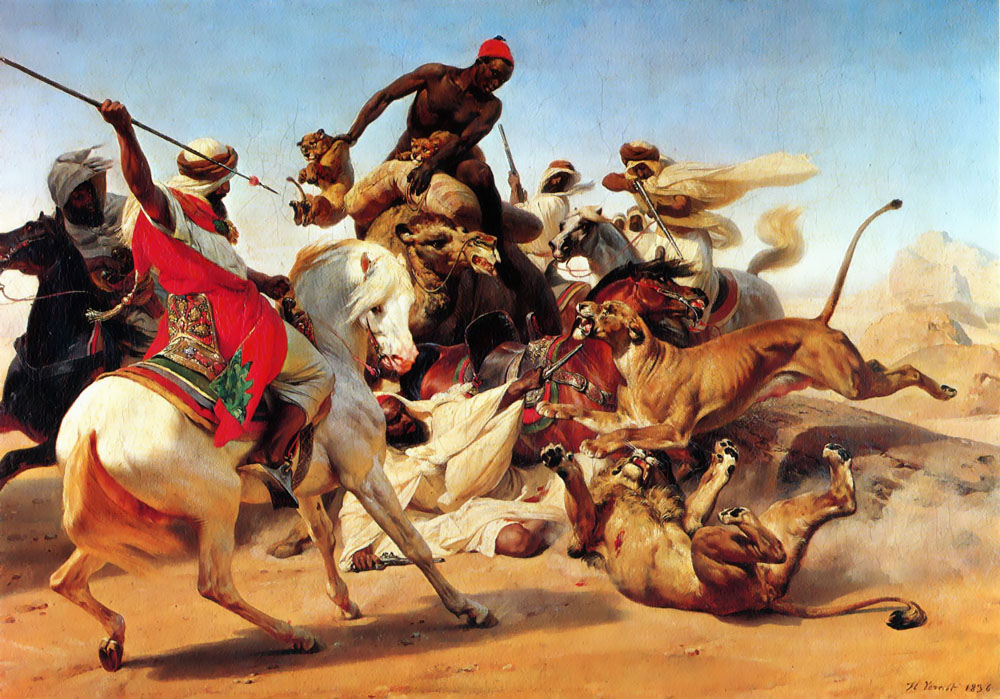
The Lion Hunt, 1836

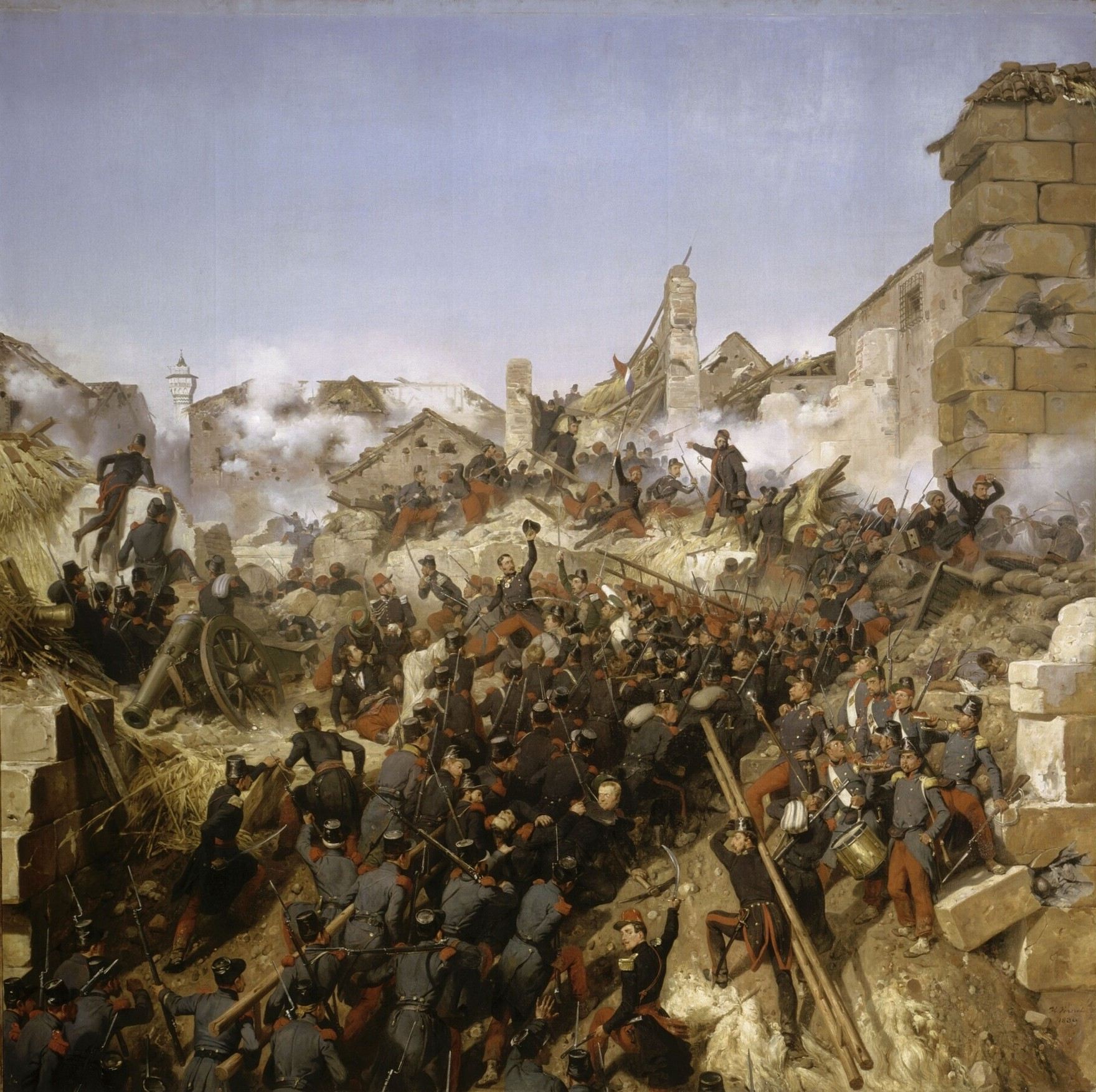
The Siege of Constantine, 1838

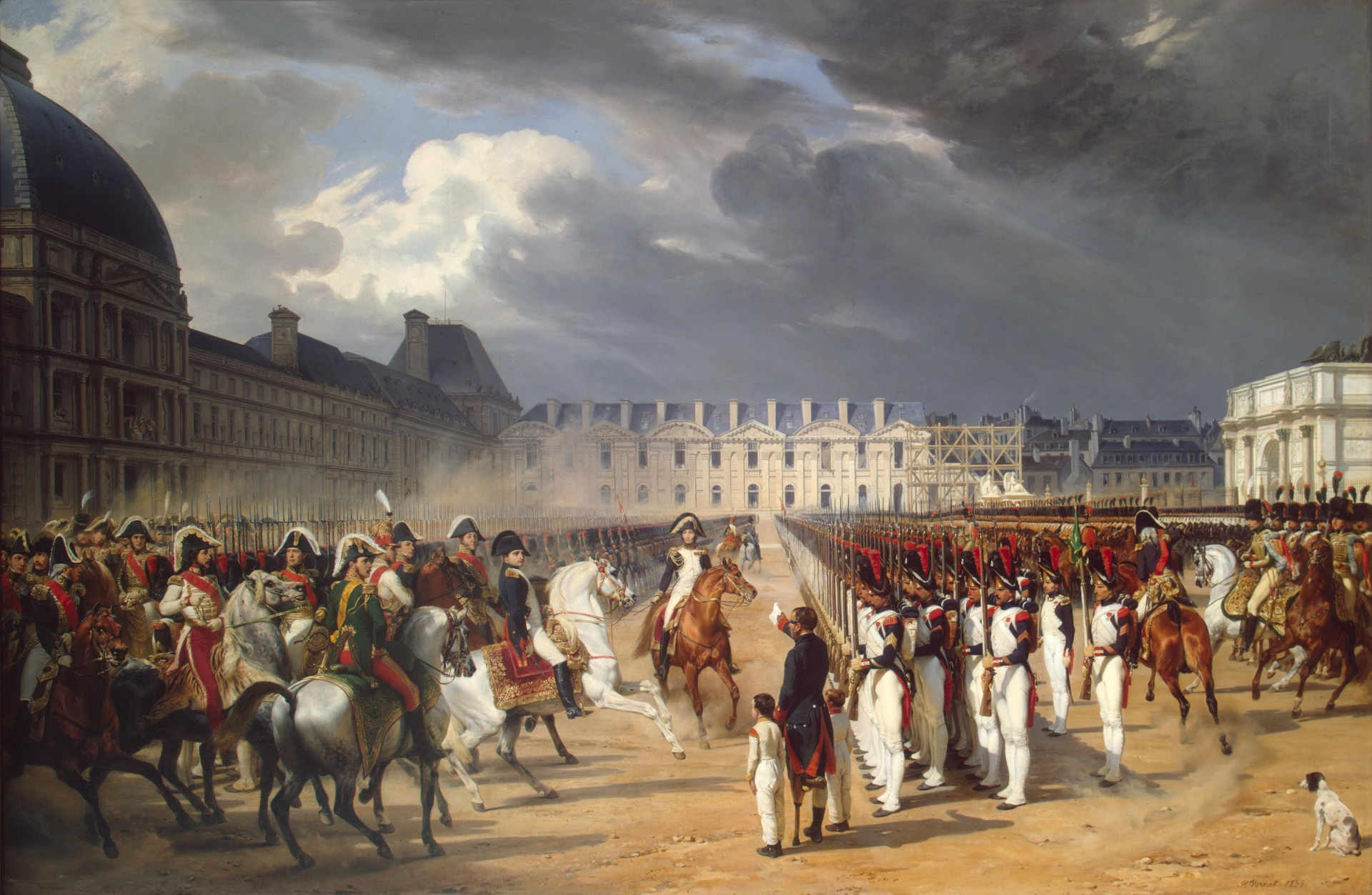
Napoleon at the Tuileries, 1838

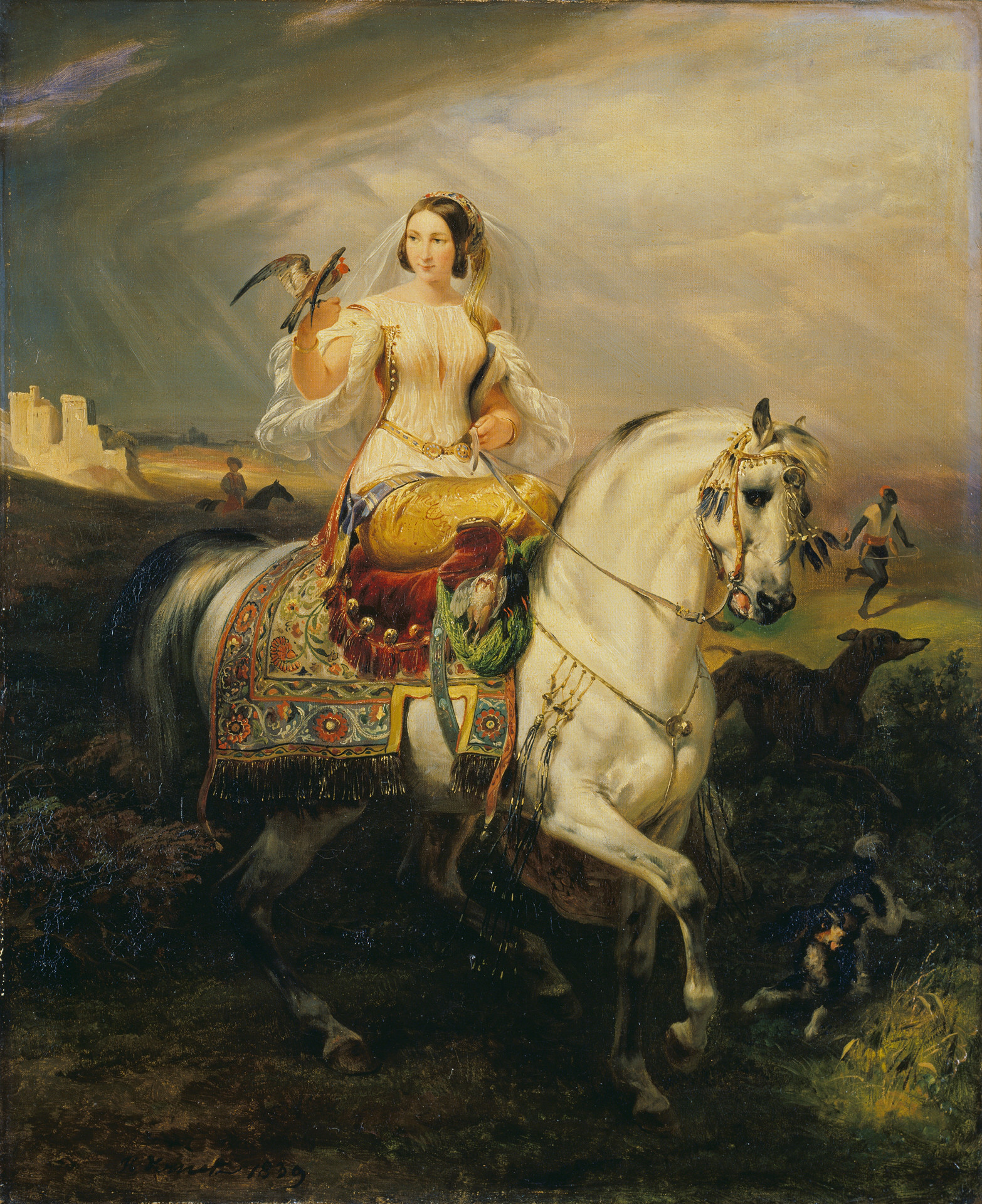
An Algerian Lady Hawking, 1839

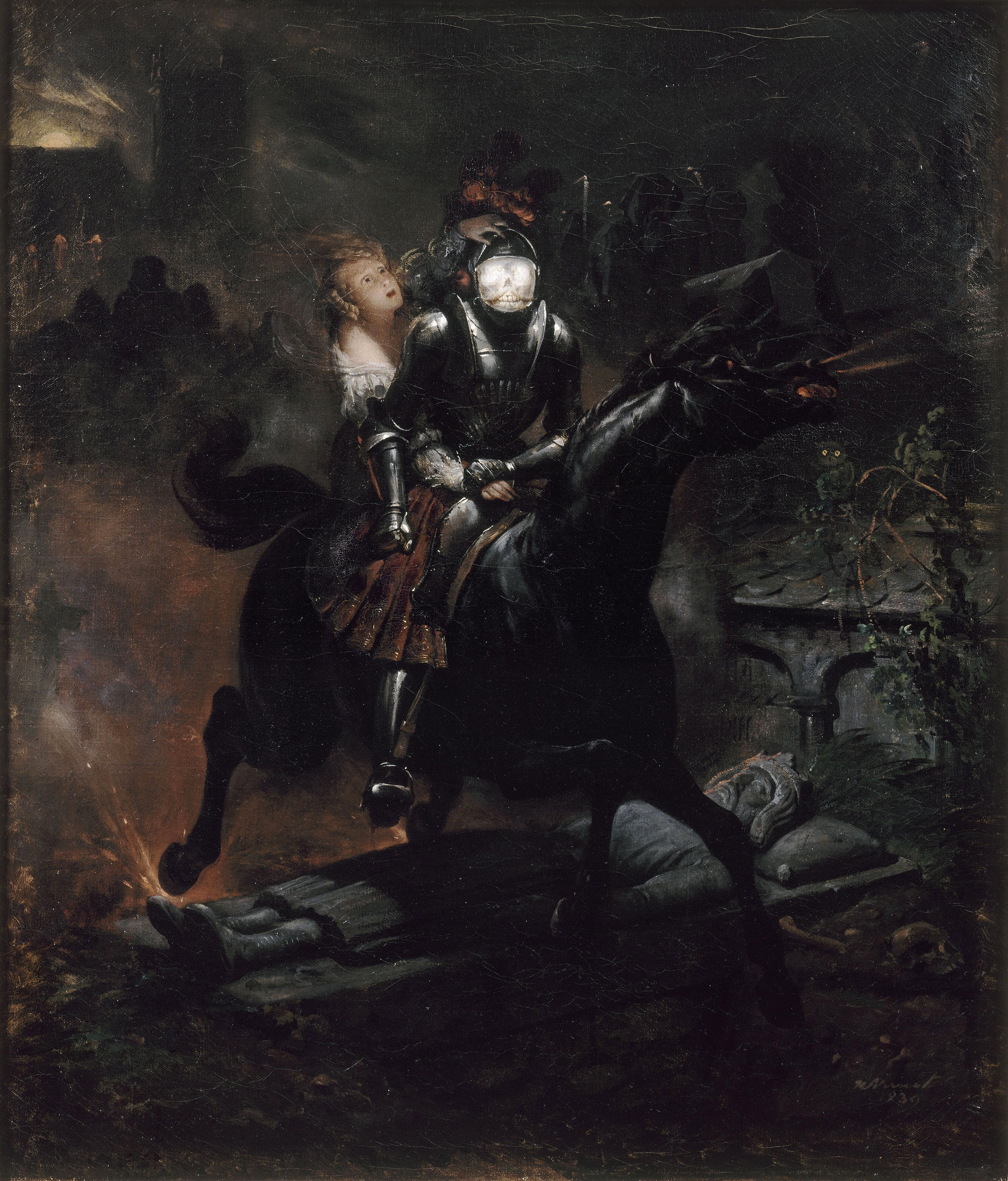
The Ballad of Lenore, 1839

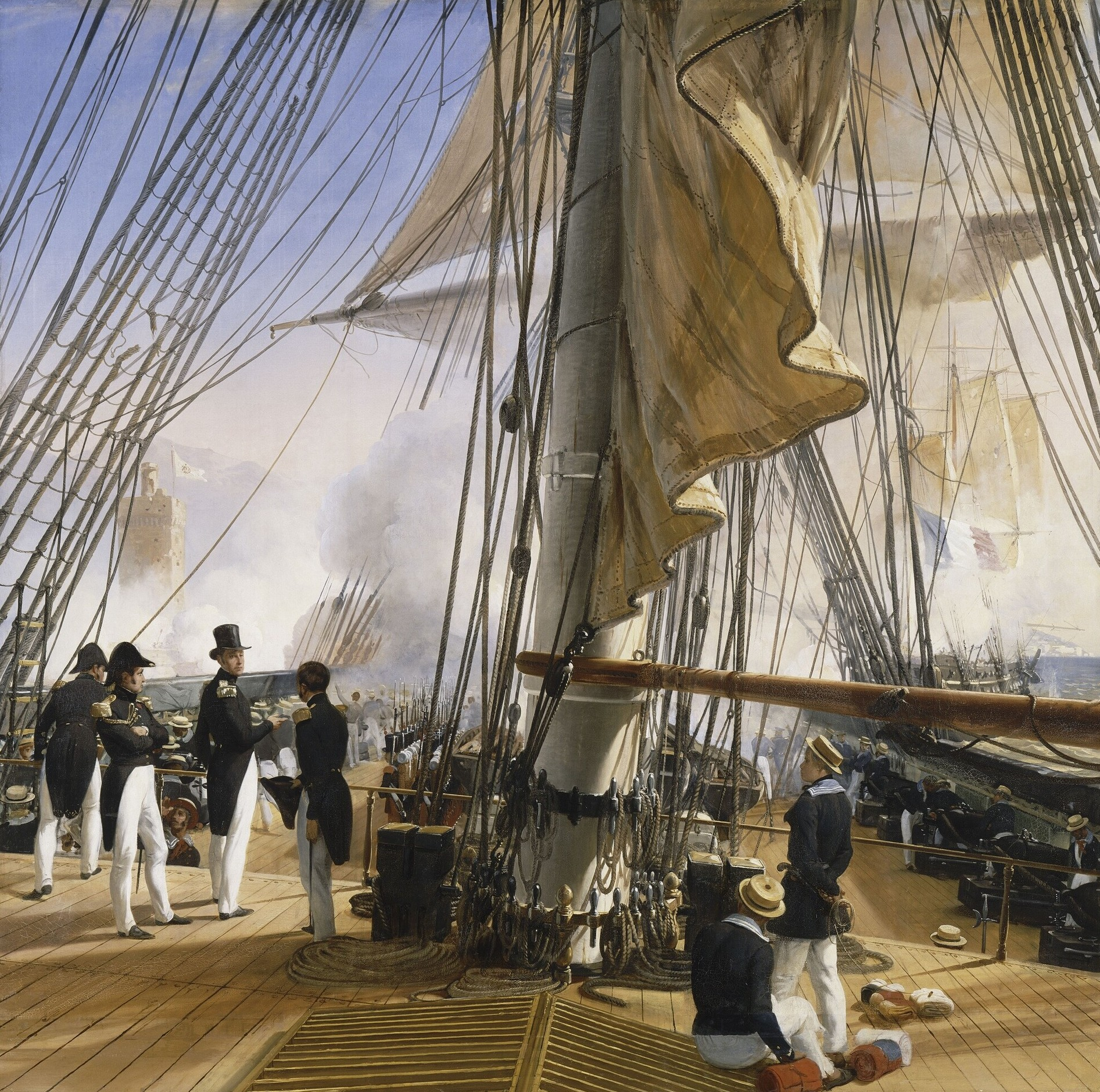
Battle of the Tagus, 1840

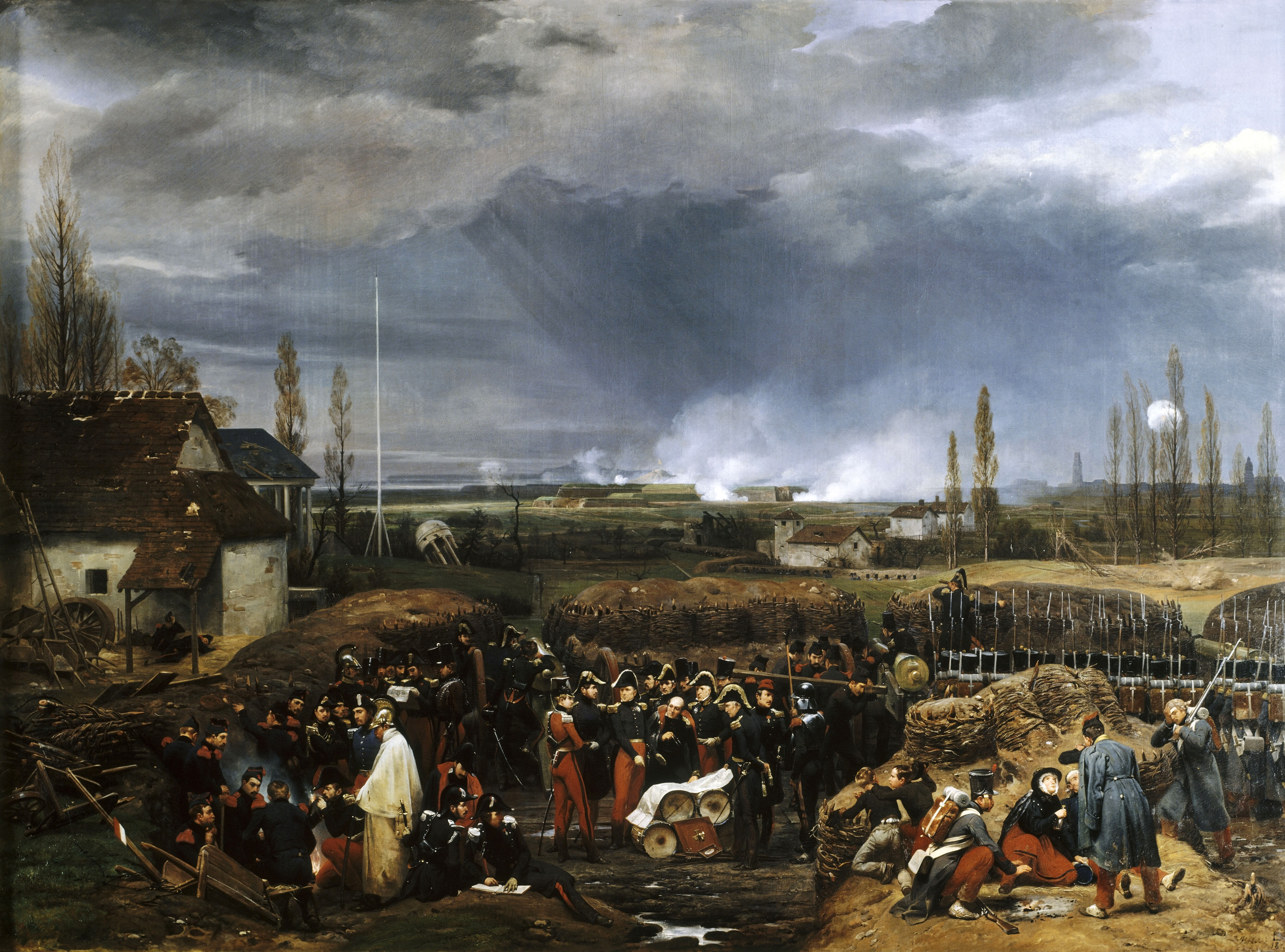
The Siege of Antwerp, 1840

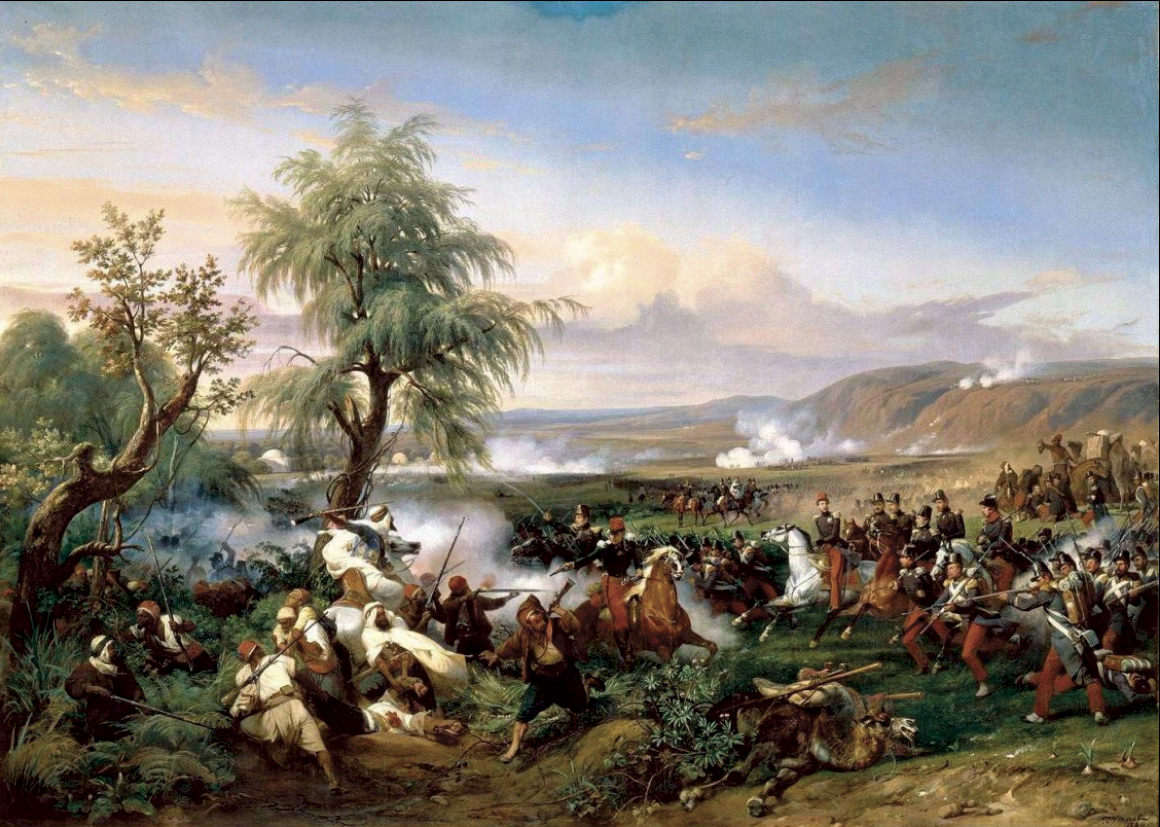
The Battle of Habrah, 1840

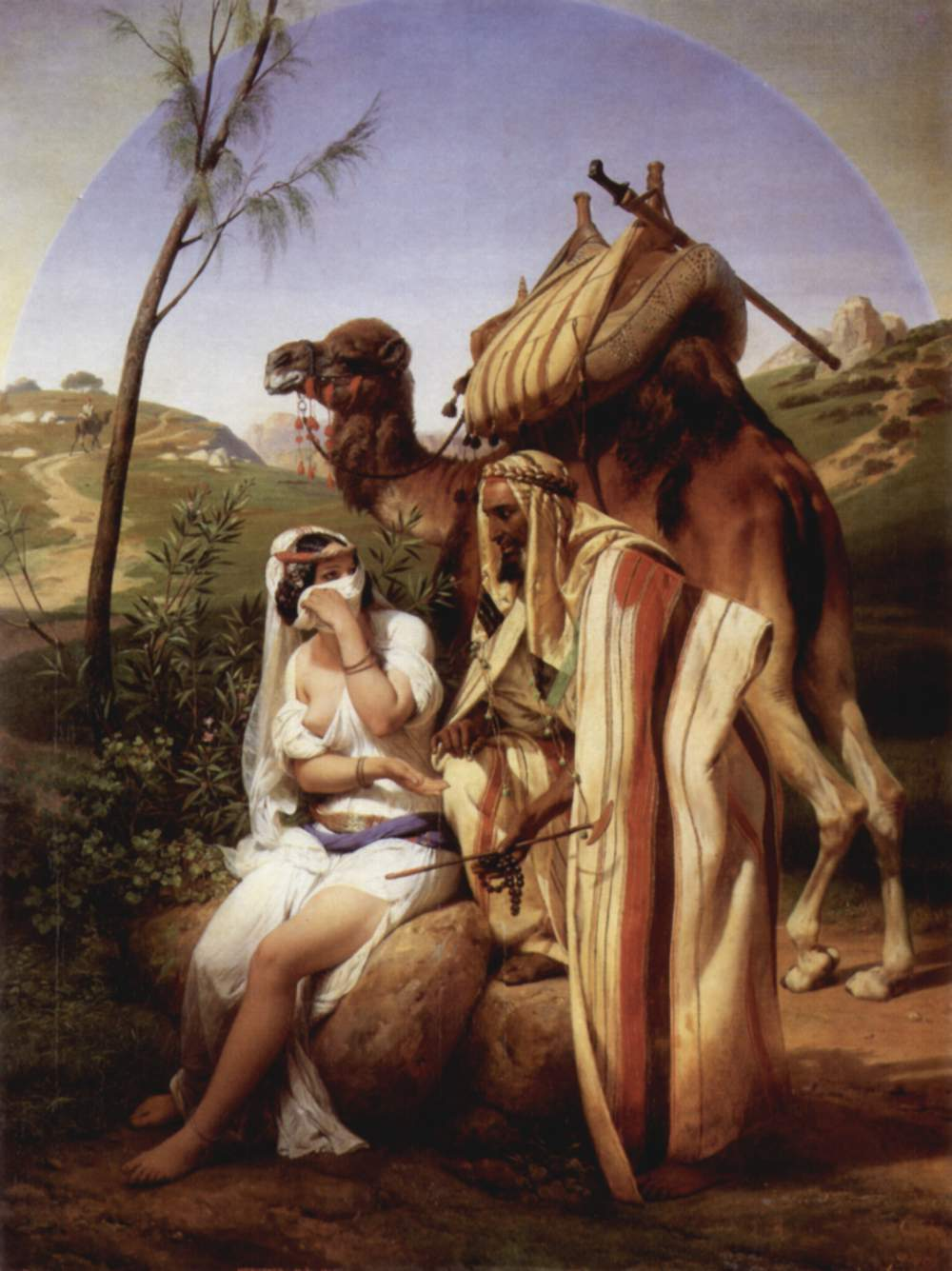
Judah and Tamar, 1840

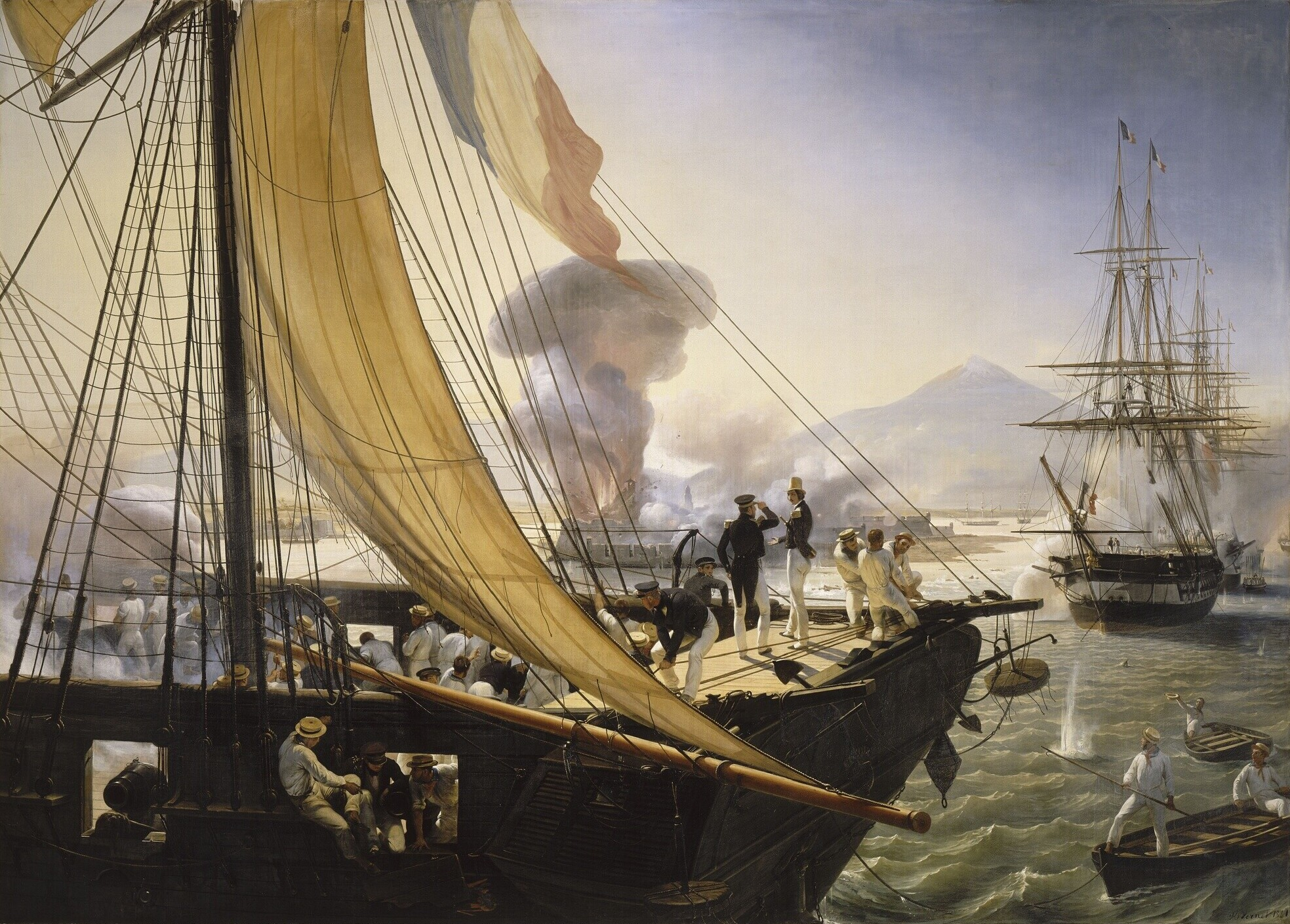
Episode of the Mexican expedition in 1838, 1841

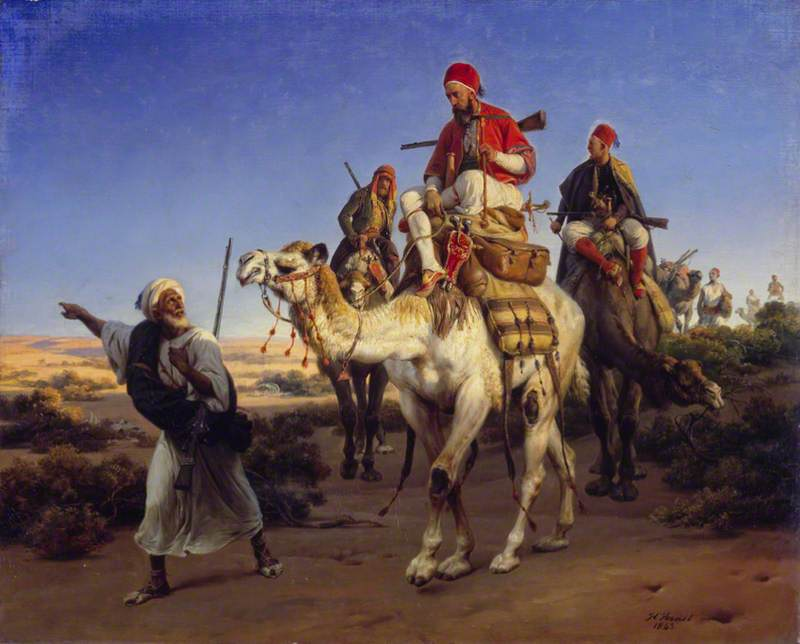
Arabs Travelling in the Desert, 1843

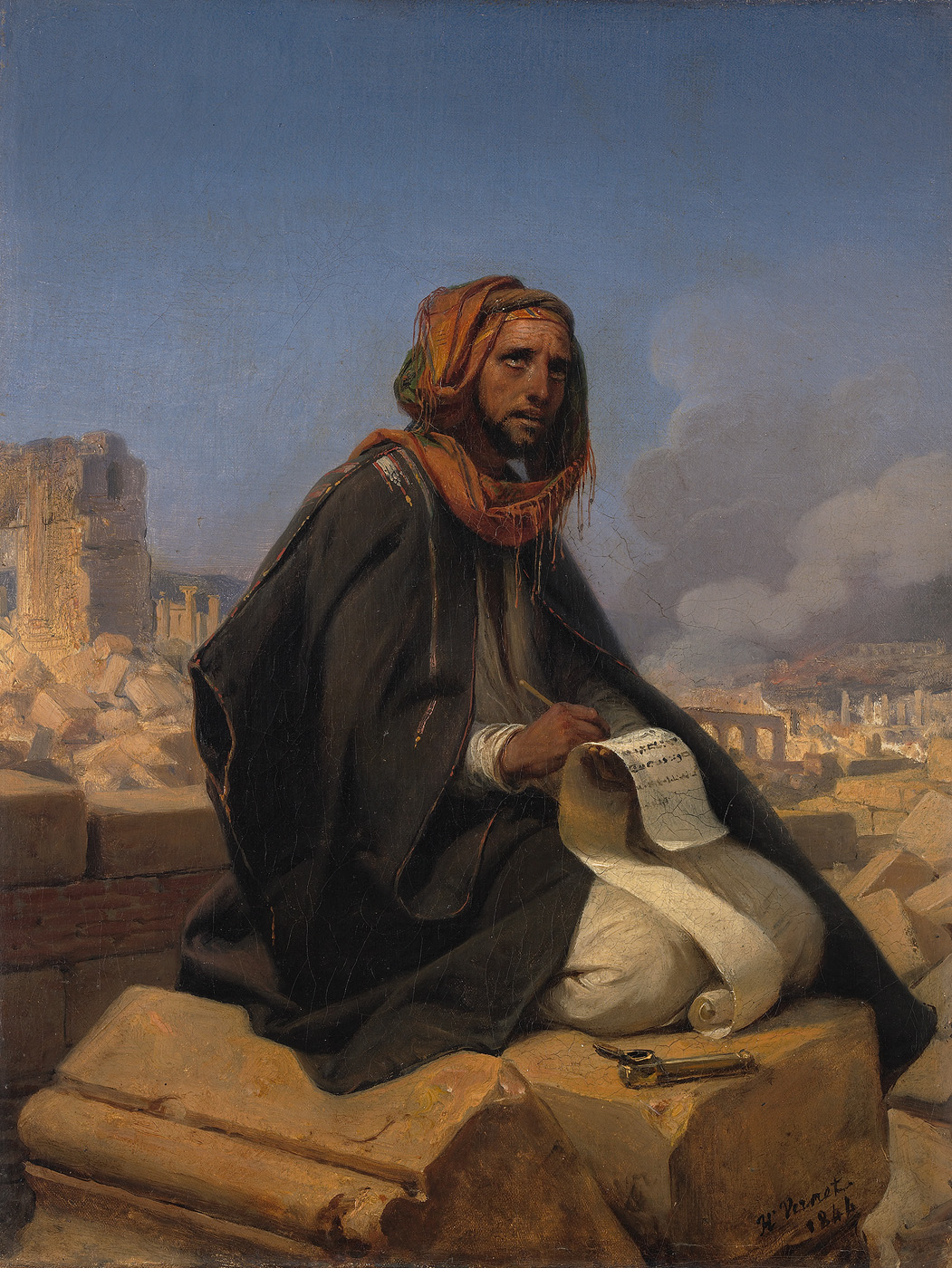
Jeremiah on the Ruins of Jerusalem, 1844

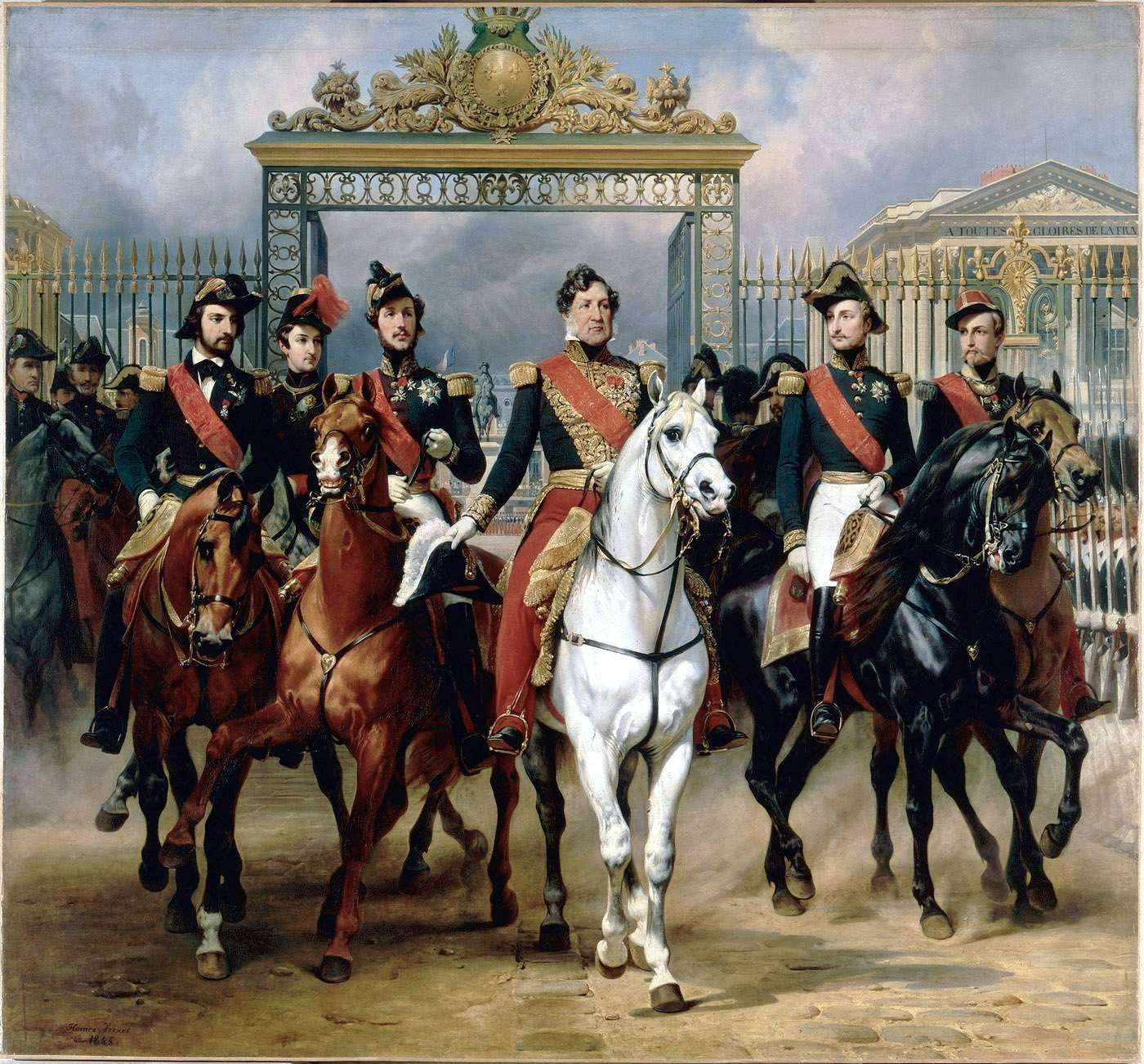
Louis Philippe and His Sons, 1846

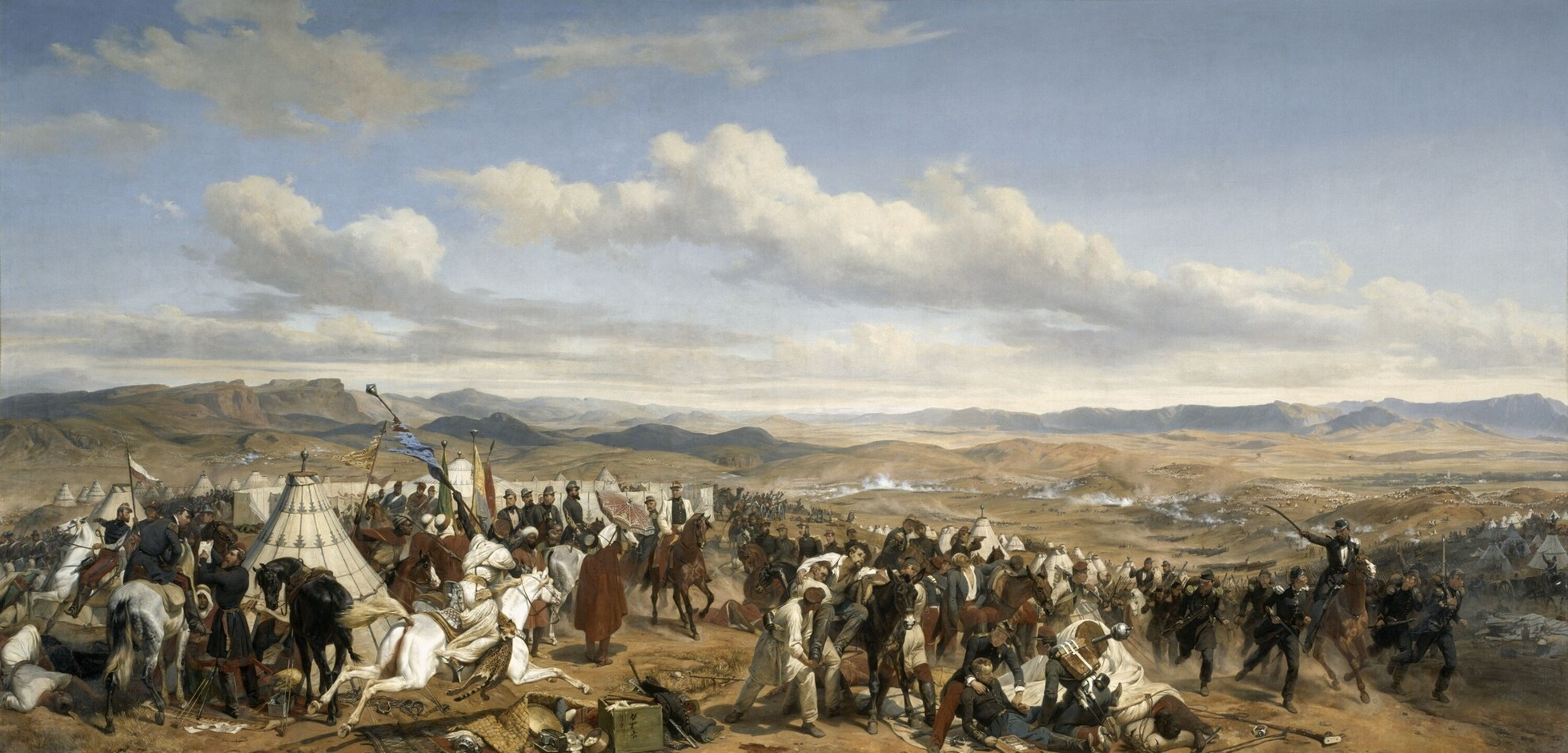
The Battle of Isly, 1846

The Angel of Death, 1851

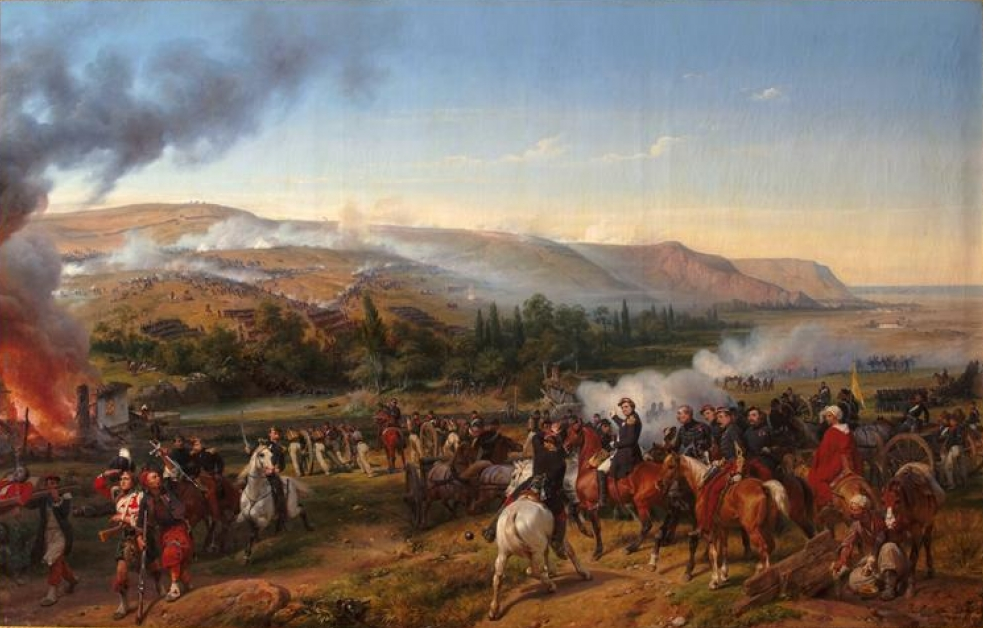
The Battle of the Alma, 1856

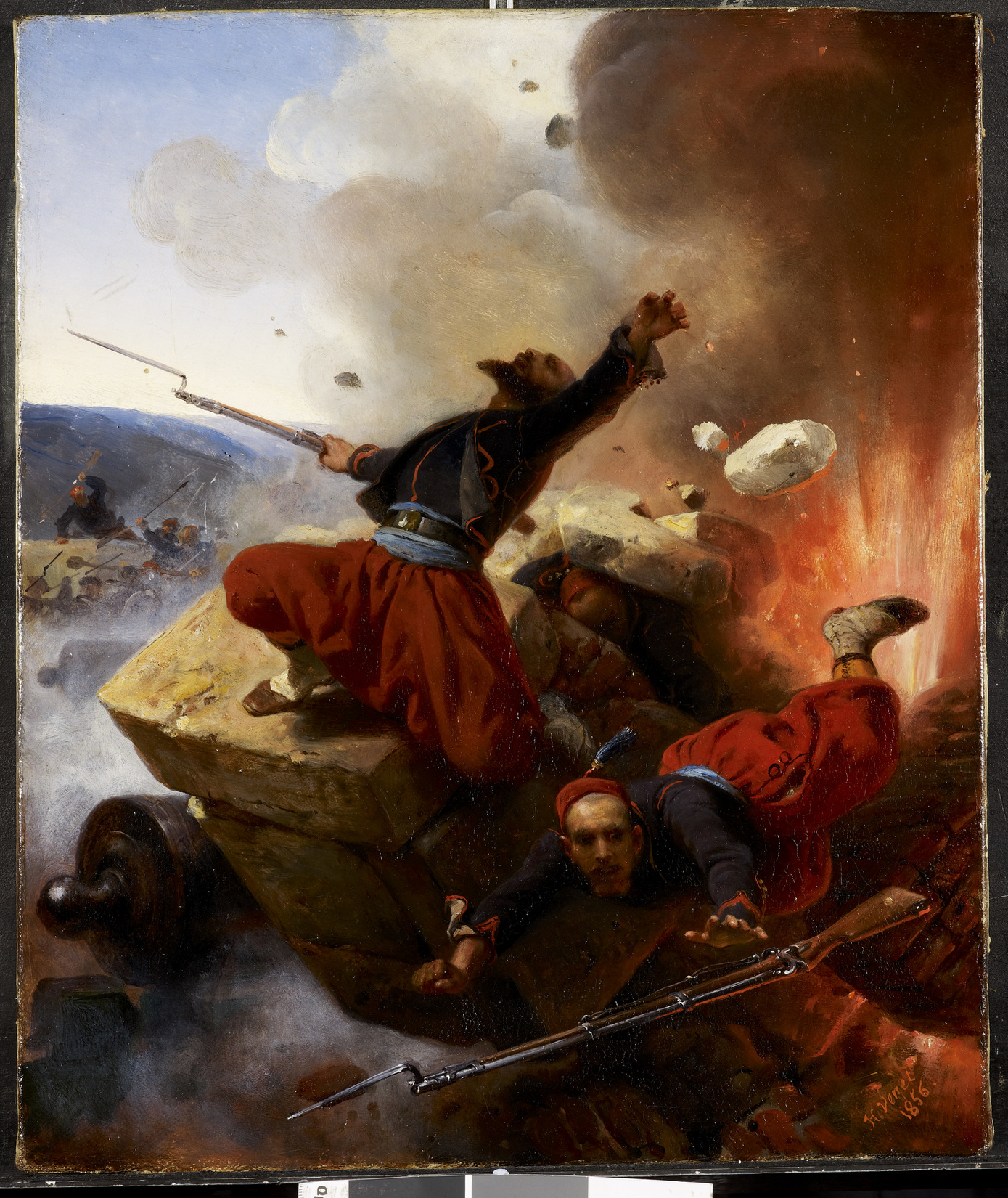
Zouaves at the Malakoff, 1856

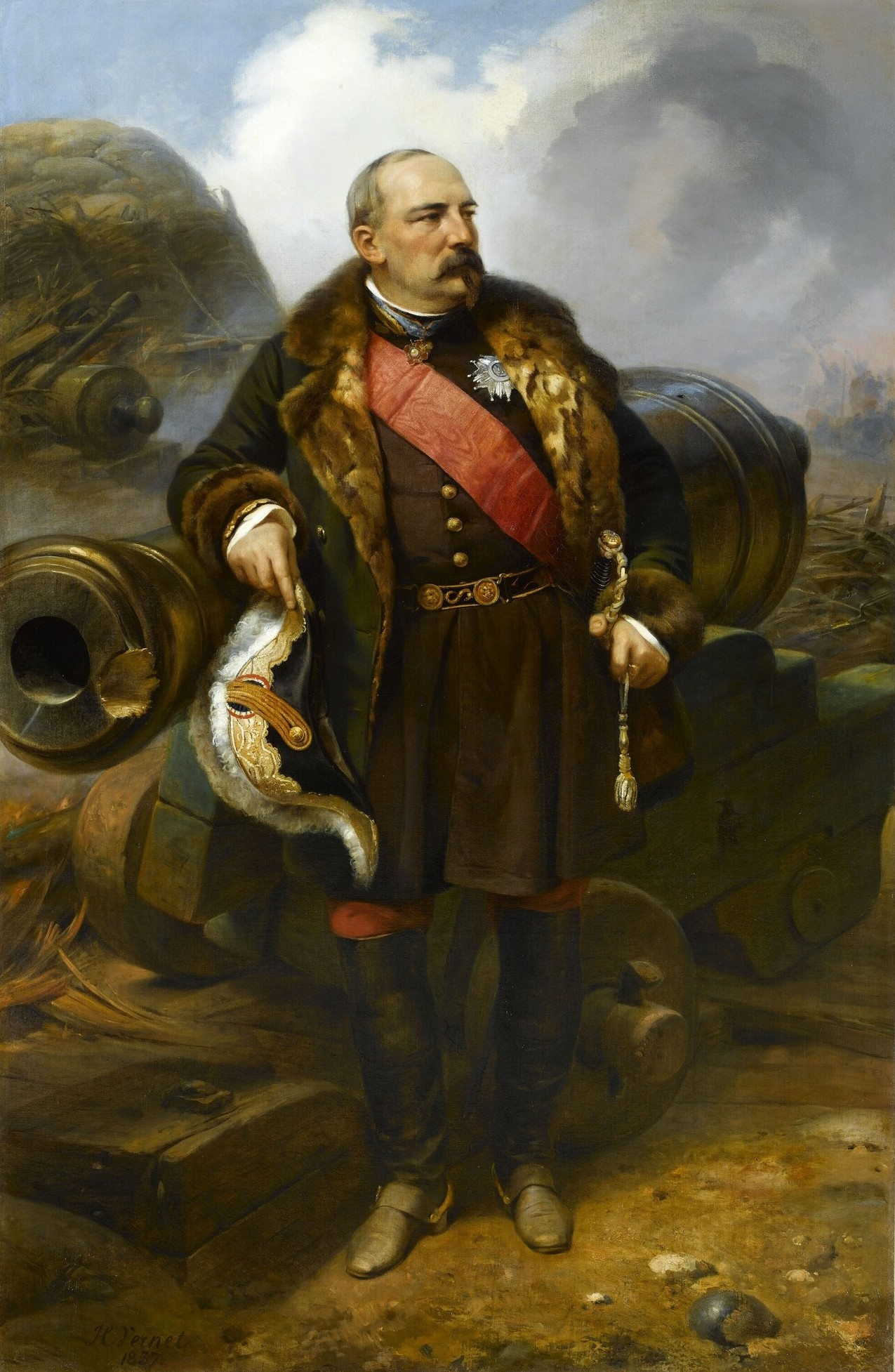
Portrait of Pierre Bosquet, 1857

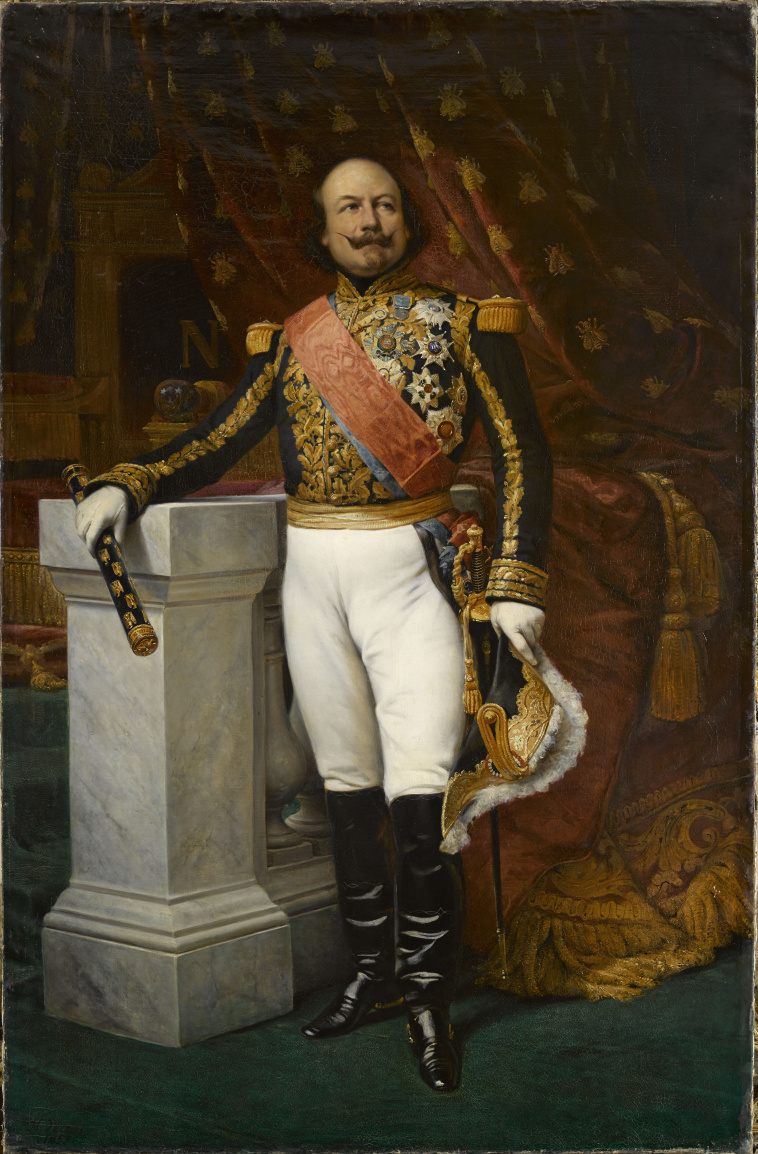
Portrait of Marshal Canrobert, 1857

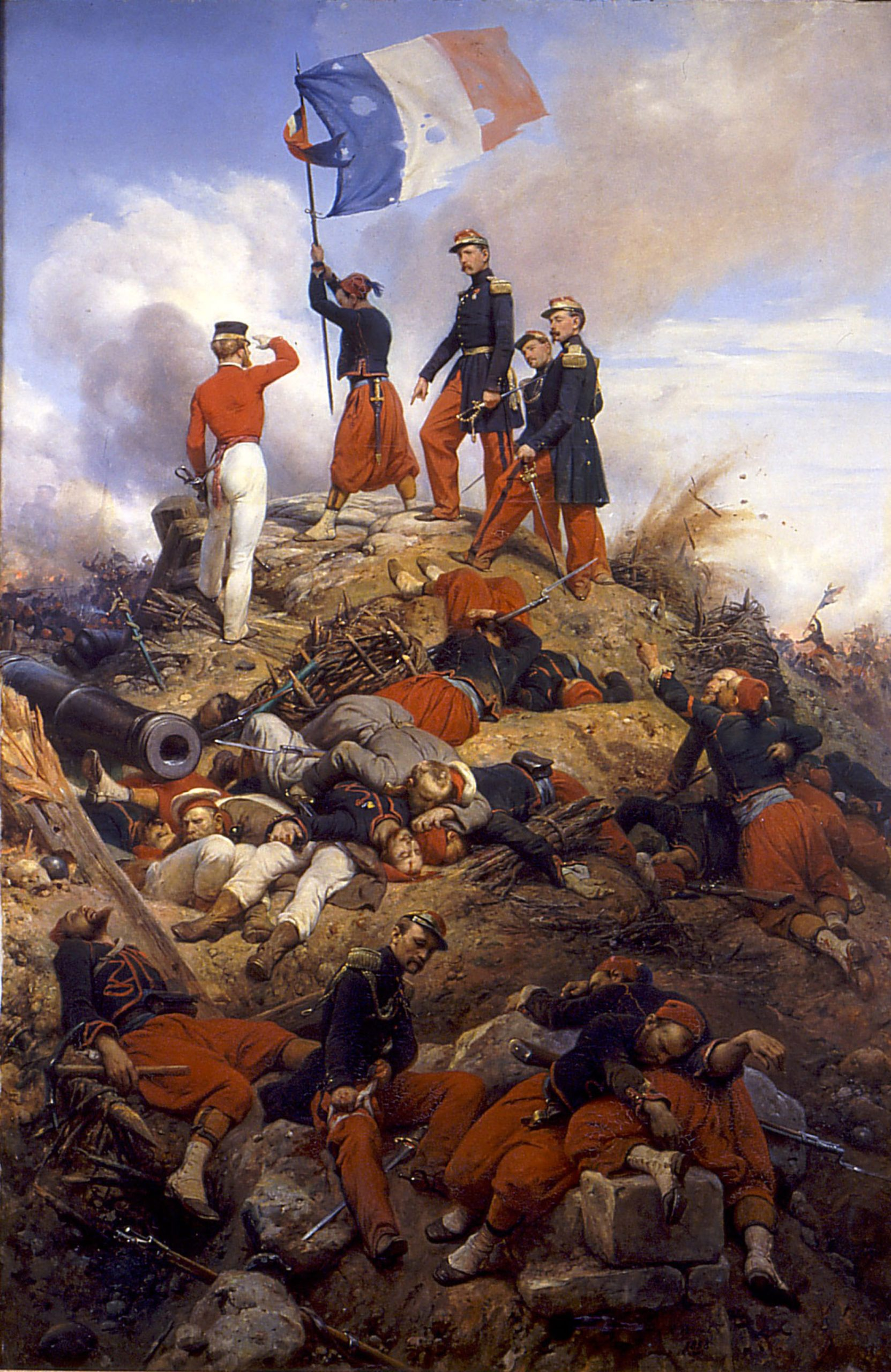
The Taking of the Malakoff Redoubt, 1858

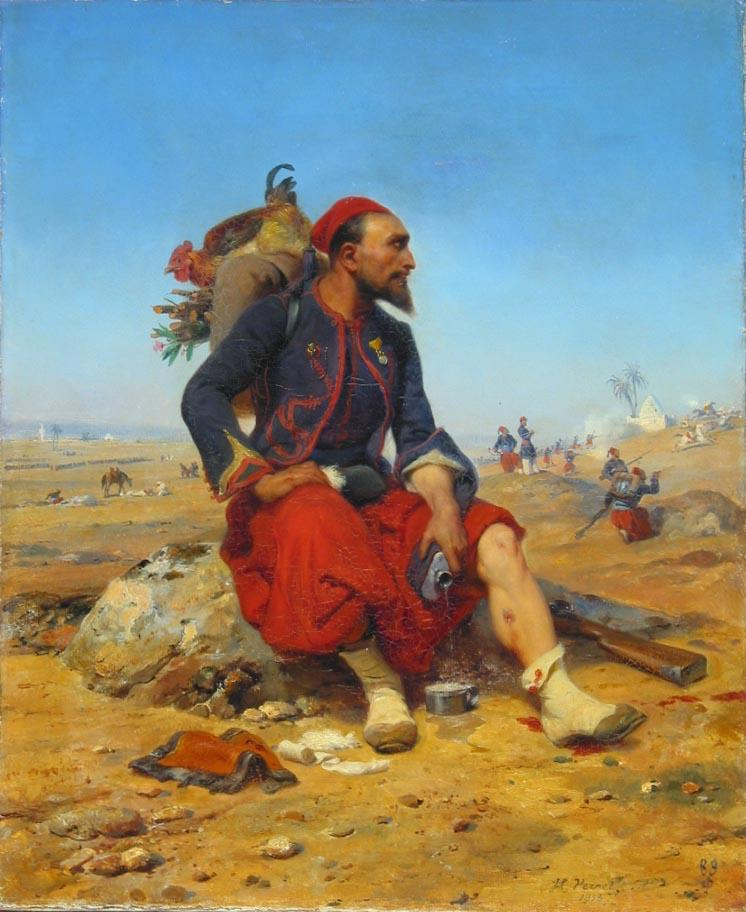
A Wounded Zouave, 1858

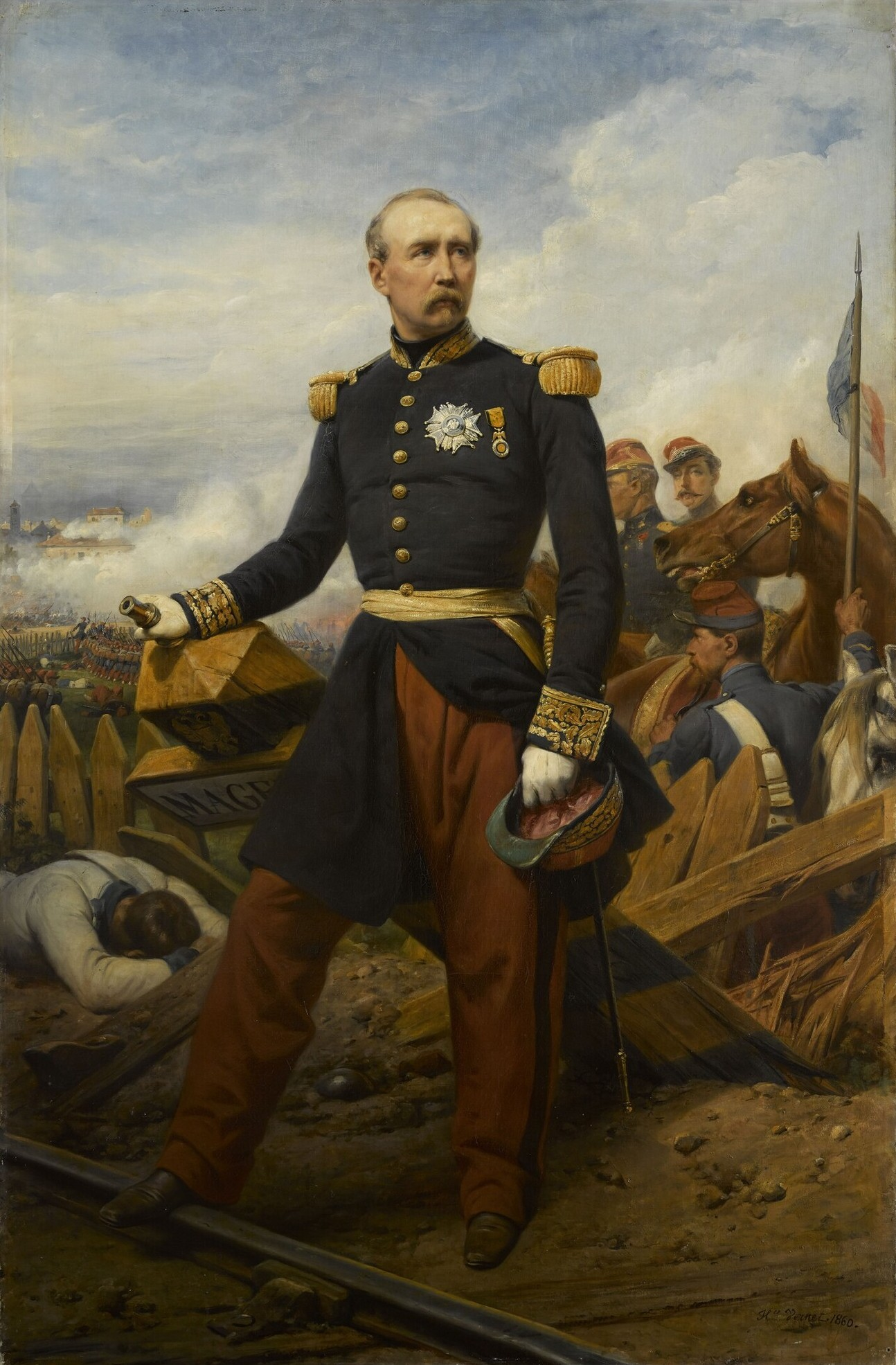
Portrait of Marshal MacMahon, 1860
