= The Lion Hunt =

The Lion Hunt may refer to:

== Art ==
- The Lion Hunt (Vernet), an 1836 painting by Horace Vernet
- The Lion Hunt (Delacroix), a series of oil on canvas paintings produced by the French artist Eugène Delacroix in the mid-1850s
- The Lion and Leopard Hunt, a Rubens painting often simply called The Lion Hunt
- The Lion Hunt (Rubens), a 1621 painting by Peter Paul Rubens

== Film ==
- Løvejagten, a 1907 silent film by Danish producer Ole Olsen and director Viggo Larsen
- The Lion Hunt, a 1938 Terrytoons cartoon
- The Lion Hunt, a 1949 Terrytoons cartoon starring Heckle and Jeckle

== Television ==
- "Lion Hunt", episode six of Visionaries: Knights of the Magical Light (1987)
- "The Lion Hunt", episode eight of The Mickey Rooney Show (1954)
- "The Lion Hunt", episode four of The Zoo Gang (1974)

== See also ==
- Lion hunting, in general, the search, pursuit and killing of lions
- The lion hunts of Amenhotep III during the first ten years of his reign, one of a group of five historical and commemorative scarabs made during the reign of Amenhotep III
- Lion Hunt of Ashurbanipal, appears on a famous group of Assyrian palace reliefs from the North Palace of Nineveh that are now displayed in room 10a of the British Museum
- The Little Lion Hunter, a 1939 Warner Bros. Merrie Melodies cartoon
- The Lion Hunters, a 1951 American film; the fifth installment in the twelve-film Bomba, the Jungle Boy series
