= The Wild Boar Hunt =

The Wild Boar Hunt may refer to:

- The Wild Boar Hunt (Rubens, Dresden), a 1618-1620 oil on oak panel painting by Peter Paul Rubens
- The Wild Boar Hunt (Rubens, Marseille), a 1615-1617 oil on canvas painting by Peter Paul Rubens
