= The Wild Boar Hunt (Rubens, Dresden) =

Painting by Peter Paul Rubens

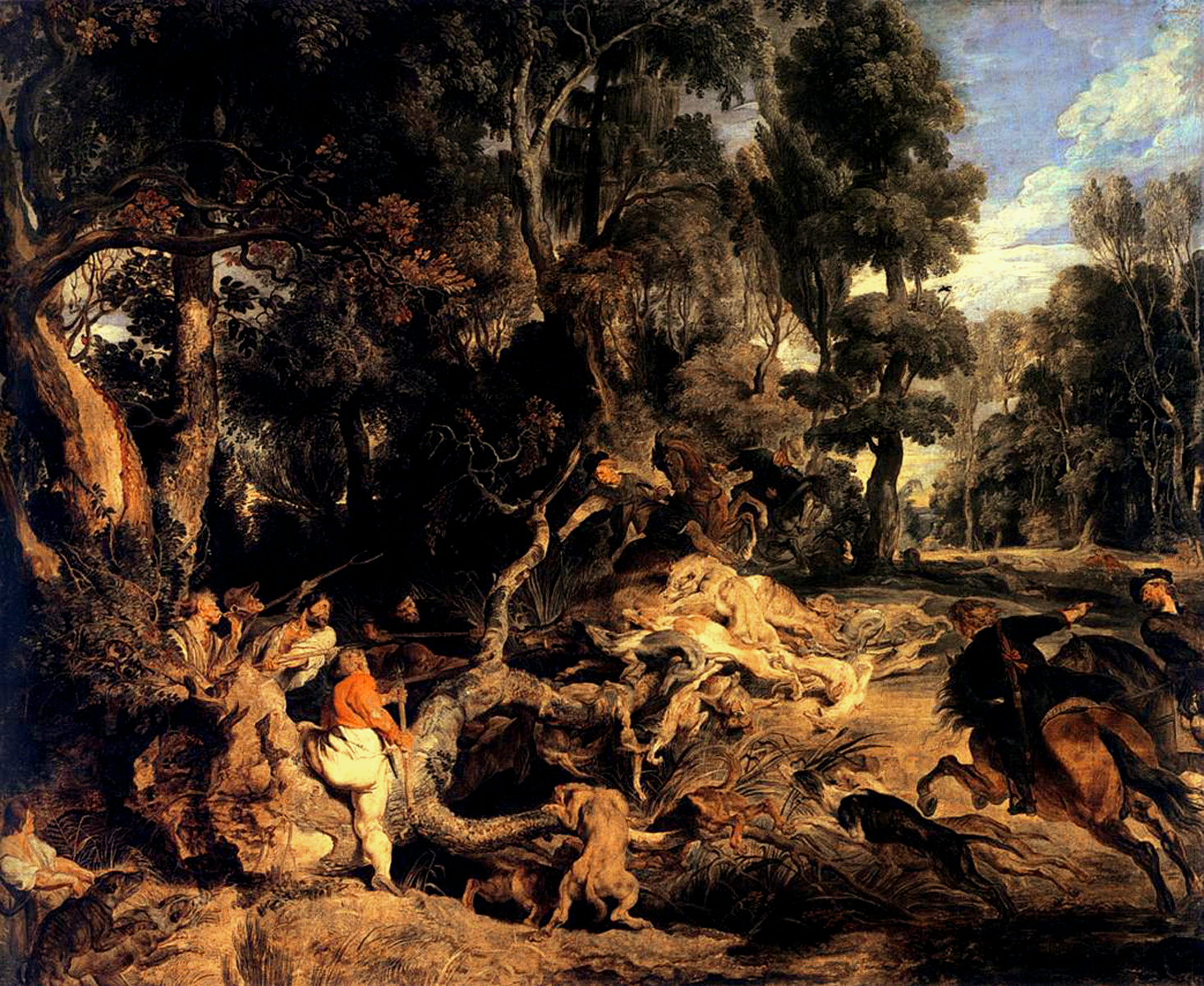

The Wild Boar Hunt is a 1618-1620 oil on oak panel painting by Peter Paul Rubens, now in the Gemäldegalerie Alte Meister in Dresden.

== Related subjects by Rubens ==
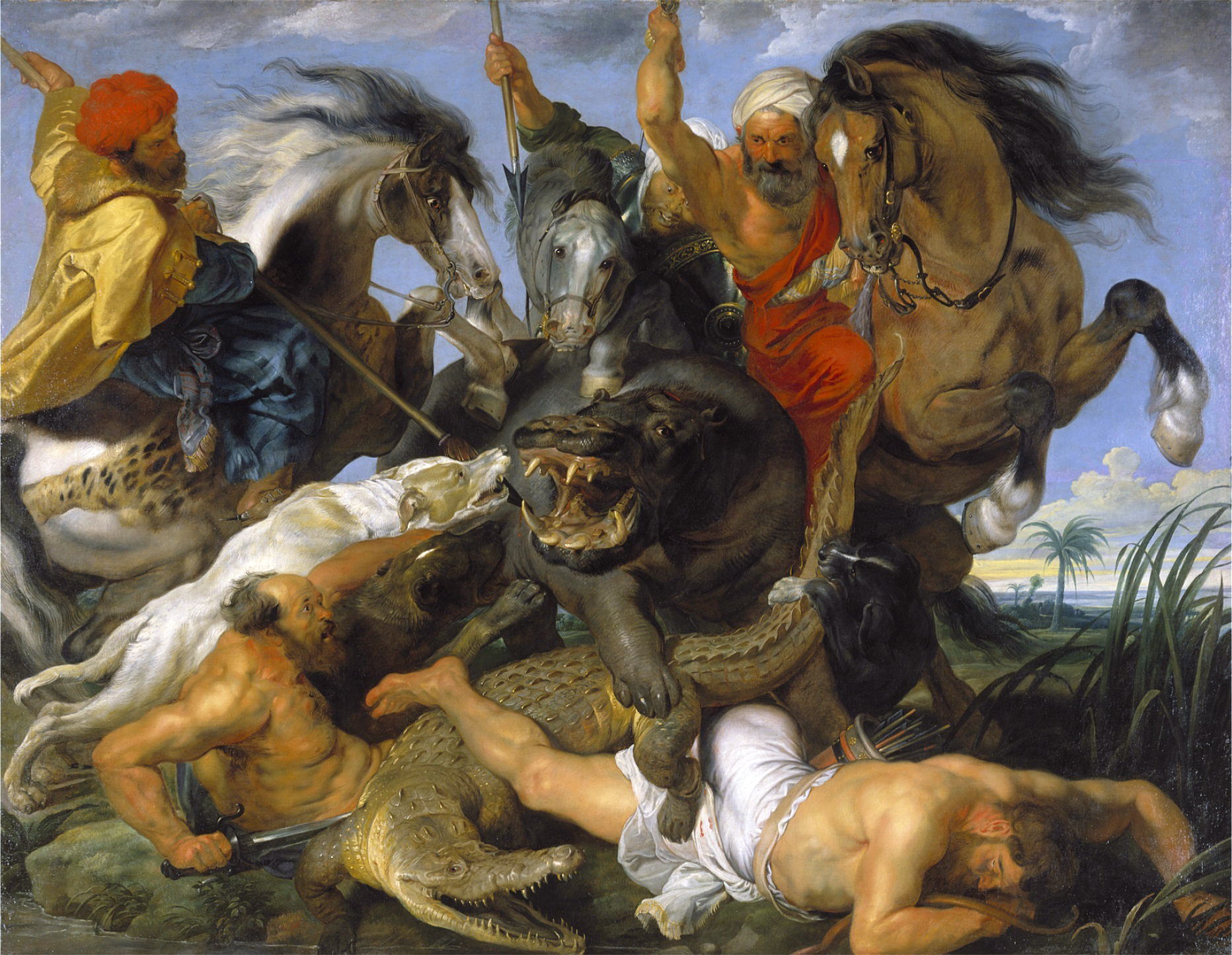
The Hippopotamus and Crocodile Hunt

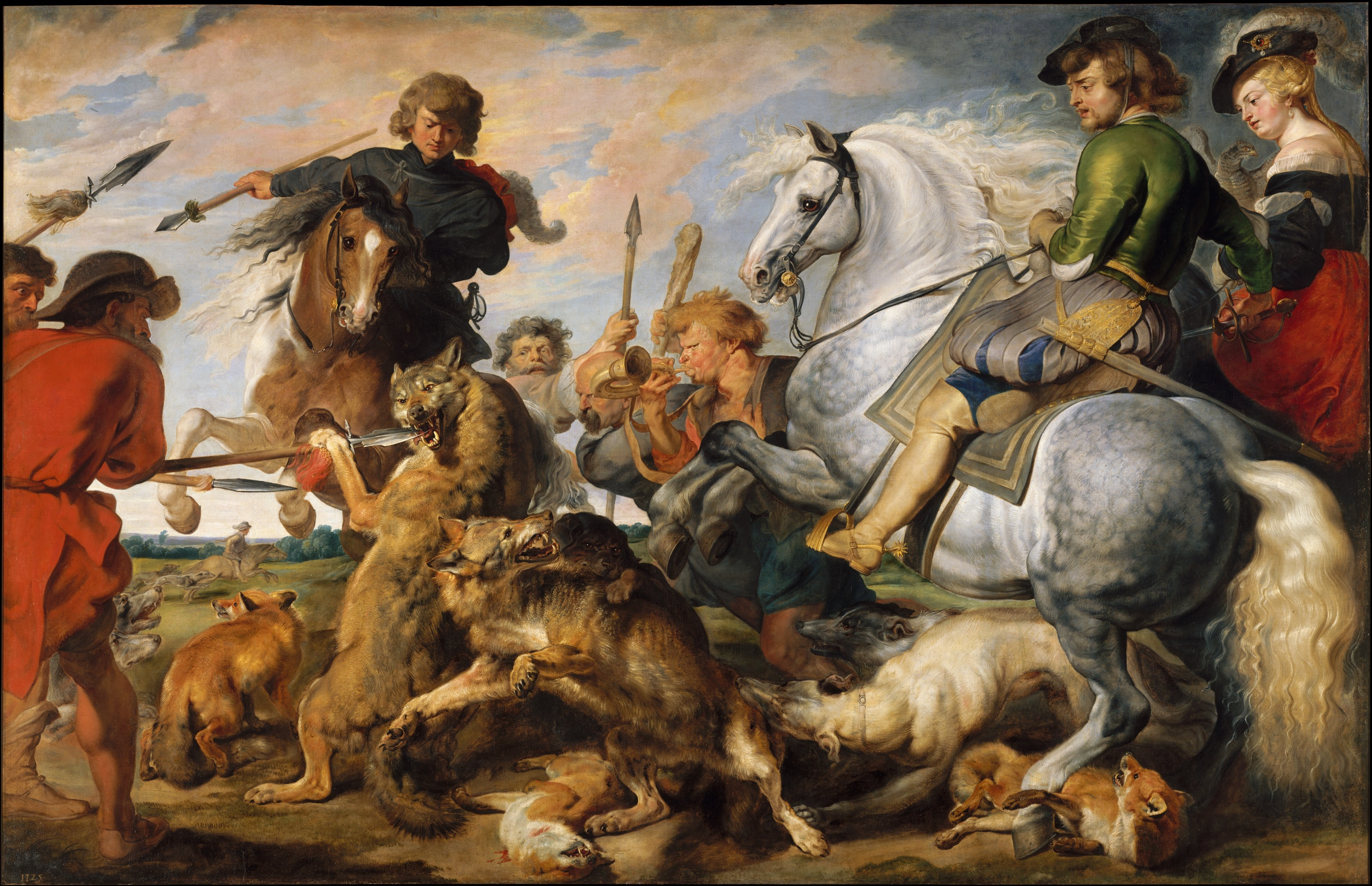
The Wolf and Fox Hunt

The Lion Hunt

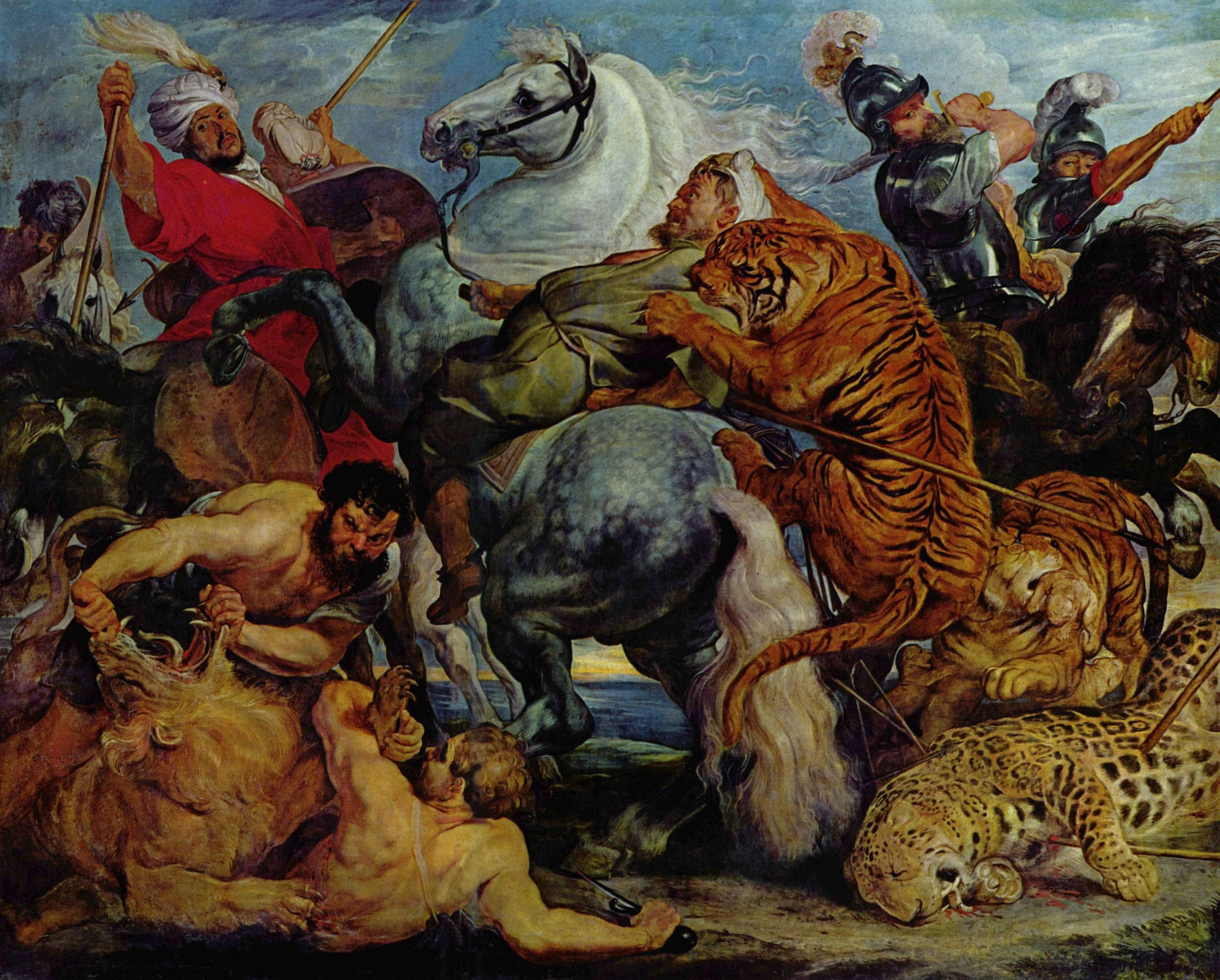
The Tiger Hunt
