= The Lion and Leopard Hunt =

Painting by Peter Paul Rubens

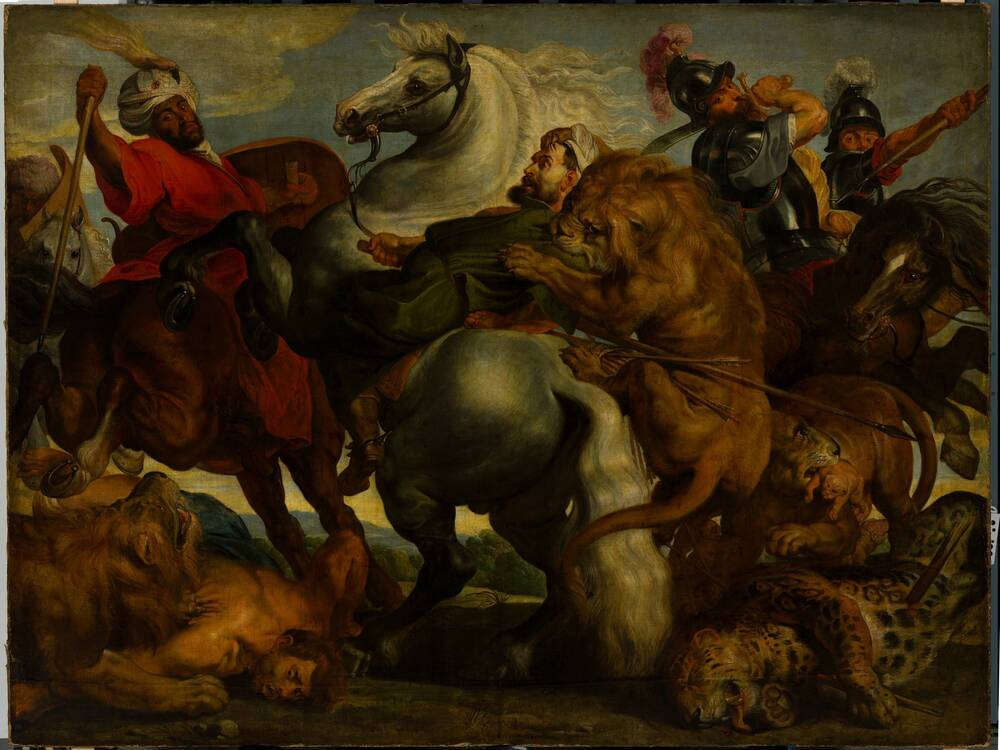
- Artist: Unknown
- Year: 1610s
- Medium: oil paint, canvas
- Dimensions: 240 cm (94 in) × 317 cm (125 in)
- Location: Gemäldegalerie Alte Meister
- Accession: Gal.-Nr. 972

The Lion and Leopard Hunt or The Lion Hunt is a hunting painting from 1617–1618 by the workshop of Peter Paul Rubens, held since 1742 in the Gemäldegalerie Alte Meister in Dresden, Germany.

Many copies were made of Rubens' hunting paintings and this one is very similar to his The Tiger Hunt from the Museum of Fine Arts of Rennes and its dating is debated. Though this is one of many copies, this variant itself has 4 copies listed by the Netherlands Institute for Art History.

== Bibliography ==
- Arnout Balis, Hunting Scenes, vol. 2, Oxford University Press and Harvey Miller Ltd, coll. « Corpus Rubenianum Ludwig Burchard », 1986, 406 p. (ISBN 978-0-19-921041-1), part XVIII
- David Rosand, "Rubens's Munich Lion Hunt: Its Sources and Significance", The Art Bulletin, College Art Association, vol. 51, no 1, March 1969, p. 29-40
