= The Hippopotamus and Crocodile Hunt =

Painting by Peter Paul Rubens

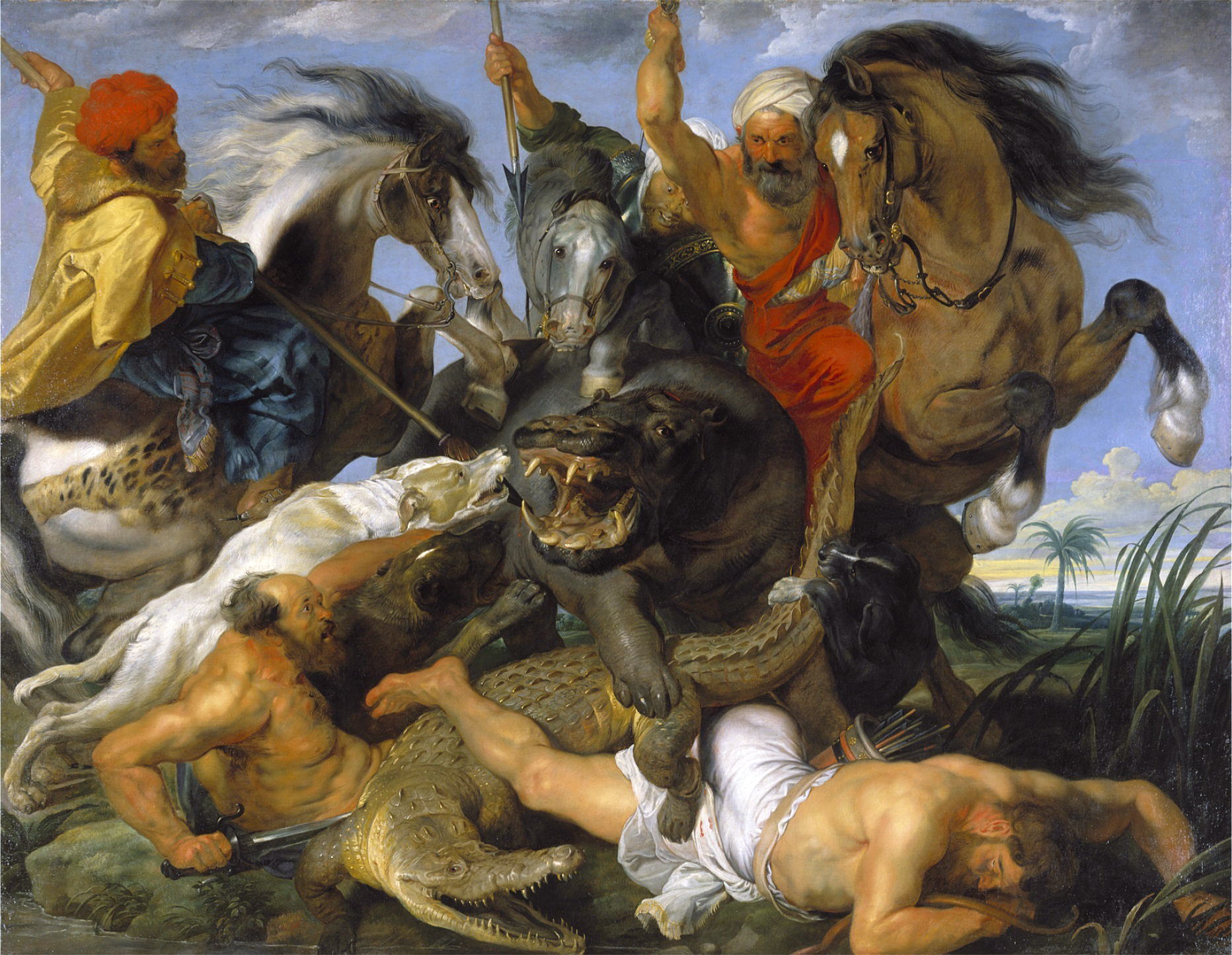
- Artist: Peter Paul Rubens
- Year: 1615–1616
- Medium: Oil on canvas
- Dimensions: 248 cm × 321 cm (98 in × 126 in)
- Location: Alte Pinakothek, Munich

The Hippopotamus and Crocodile Hunt is an oil painting on canvas by Peter Paul Rubens. It was commissioned in 1615 to decorate Schleißheim Palace, along with three other works depicting lion, wolf, and boar hunts. The cycle of paintings was looted from the palace during the Napoleonic Wars. Only the Hippopotamus and Crocodile Hunt was returned to Munich, at which time it was added to the collection that is now the Alte Pinakothek.

== Description ==
Peter Paul Rubens created the canvas oil painting entitled The Hippopotamus and Crocodile Hunt between 1615–16. The hunt takes place on the banks of the Nile, as indicated by a palm tree in the background. As hippopotami and crocodiles were considered dangerous nuisances, their destruction was a duty performed by noblemen. The hunting party comprises three men in orientalizing costume—mounted on Arabian horses, who hunt with lance and sword — and two valets clad in roughly-hewn jerkins — one of whom has been killed by one of the beasts. The enraged hippopotamus tramples the crocodile, as both are attacked by the hunters and hounds. The accurately rendered physical appearances of the hippopotamus and crocodile contrast with contemporary renderings and reflect the period's growing interest in empiricism and natural history. It has been suggested that Rubens may have traveled to Rome to view a temporarily displayed dead hippopotamus preserved in brine prior to the painting of the picture.

== History ==
Rubens contributed to the long-standing genre of the large hunting scene and his studio produced dozens for aristocratic patrons in the 1610s and 1620s. Maximilian I, Elector of Bavaria, commissioned the Hippopotamus and Crocodile Hunt three others depicting lion, wolf, and boar hunts, in 1615 to decorate Schleißheim Palace, the summer residence of the Wittelsbach princes. Rubens and his studio produced the four large canvases in Antwerp over the years 1615–16. The Wittelsbach collection formed the nucleus of Alte Pinakothek in Munich, the present location of the Hippopotamus and Crocodile Hunt and The Lion Hunt from the same cycle. The cycle of paintings were looted from the palace during the Napoleonic Wars. Only the Hippopotamus and Crocodile Hunt was returned to Munich, at which time it was added to the collection that is now the Alte Pinakothek.

The complexity of the figure grouping, representation of turbulent motion and violent action, high drama, and brilliant palette are hallmarks of Rubens' style. In the notice of January 25, 1847, Eugène Delacroix admired the crocodile as a "masterpiece of execution", remarking, however, that "its action could have been more interesting".

== Related subjects by Rubens ==
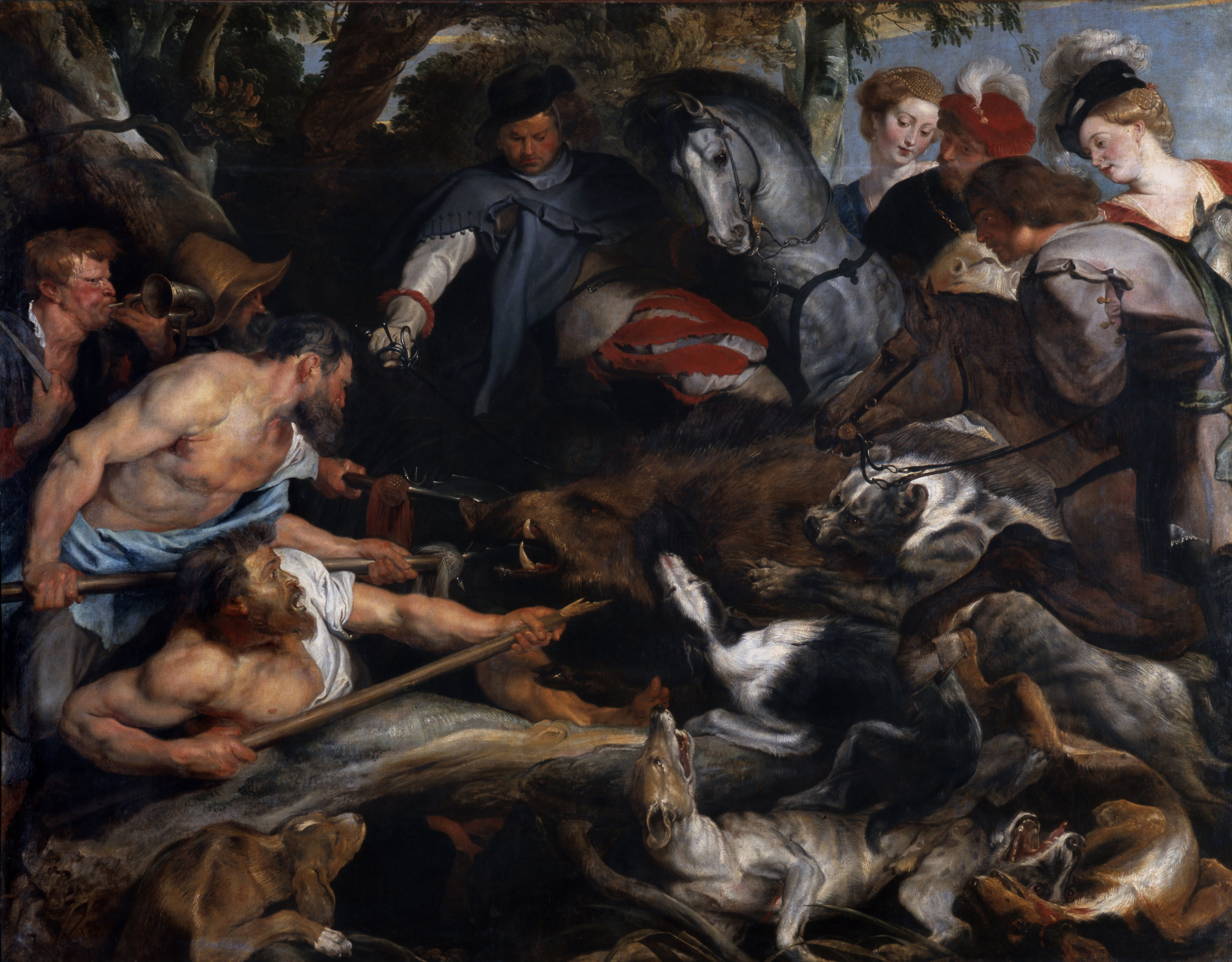
The Wild Boar Hunt

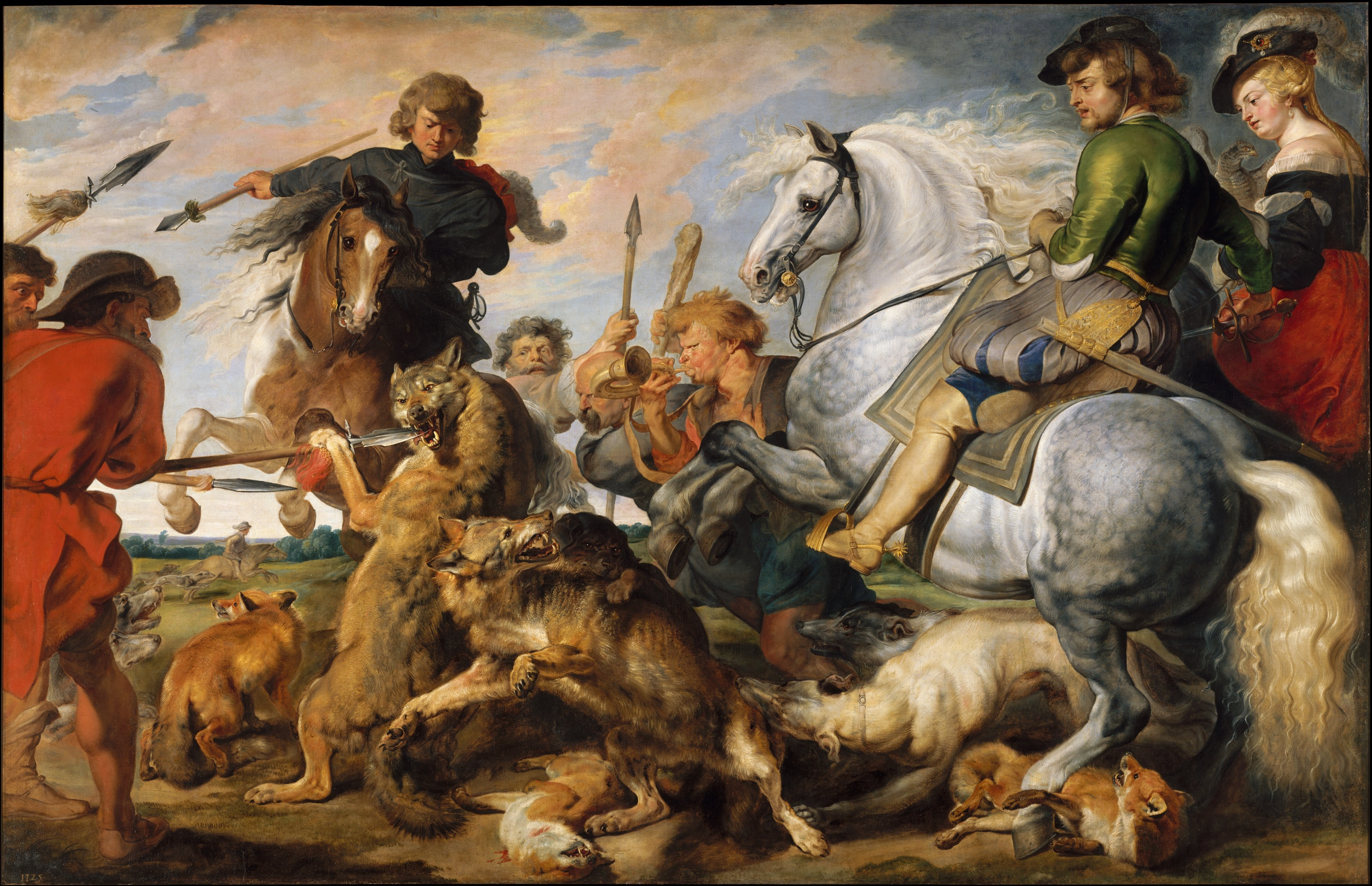
The Wolf and Fox Hunt

The Lion Hunt

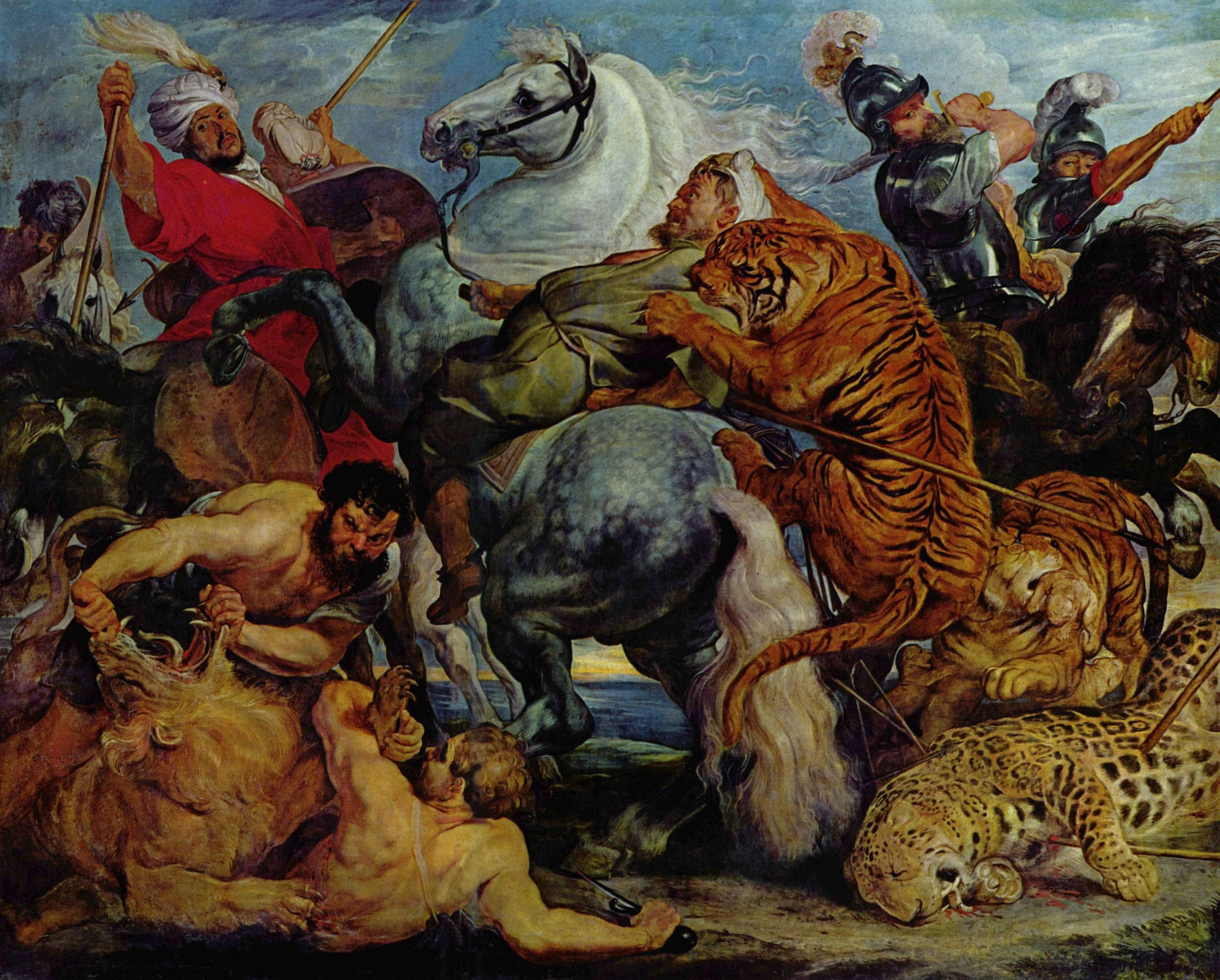
The Tiger, Leopard and Lion Hunt
