= The Wolf and Fox Hunt =

Painting by Peter Paul Rubens 17th to 18th century

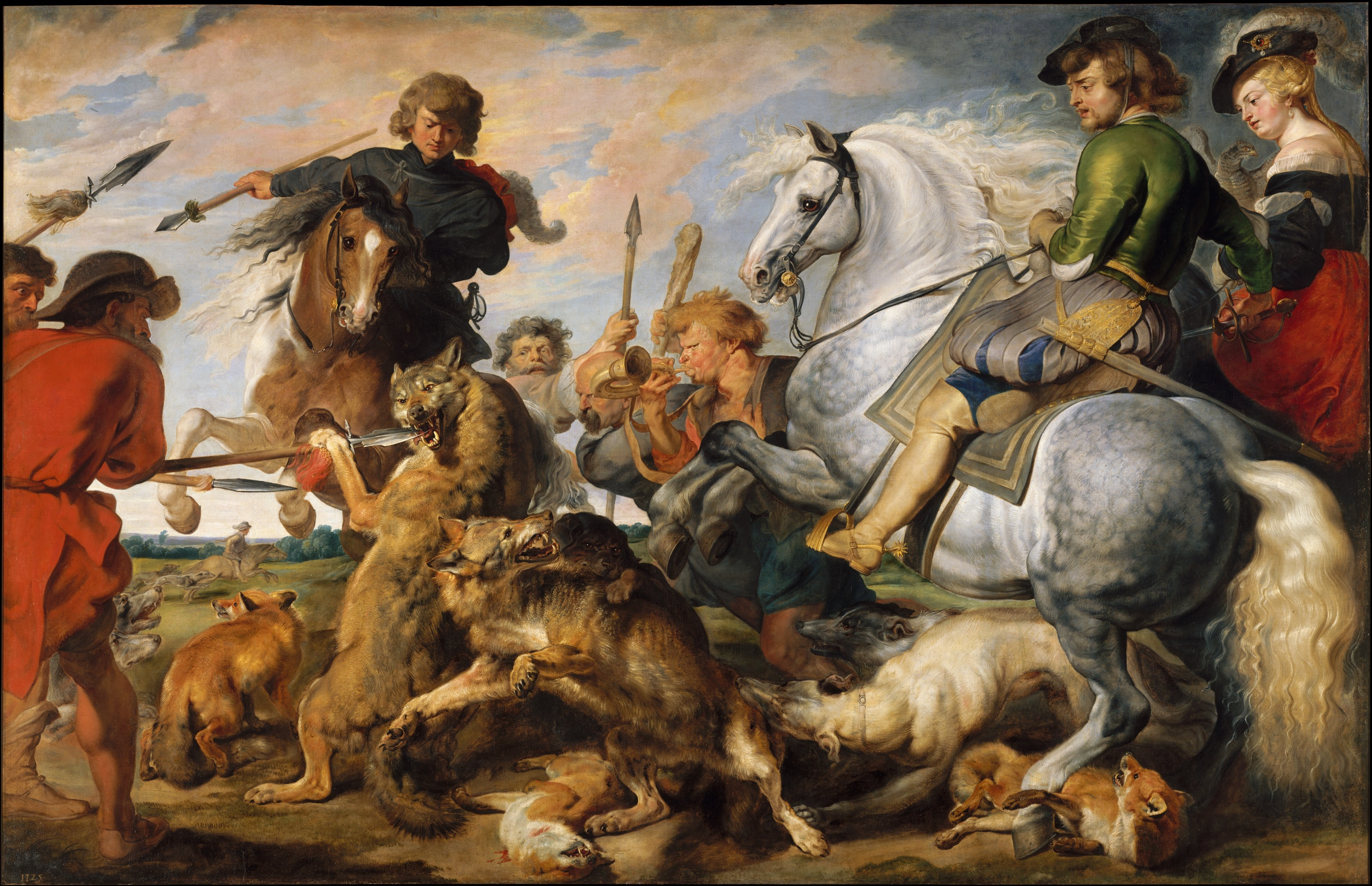
The Wolf and Fox Hunt (c. 1616) by Rubens

The Wolf and Fox Hunt is an oil-on-canvas painting by Peter Paul Rubens, executed c. 1616, now held in the Metropolitan Museum of Art in New York. It shows mounted and walking hunters chasing two wolves and three foxes. It marks the beginning of an intensive creative phase in which Rubens focused on the theme of hunting.

The painting was completed with the help of assistants, although the wolves were painted entirely by Rubens. By 67 the canvas had been trimmed at the top and left to fit into a client's home.

== Related subjects by Rubens ==
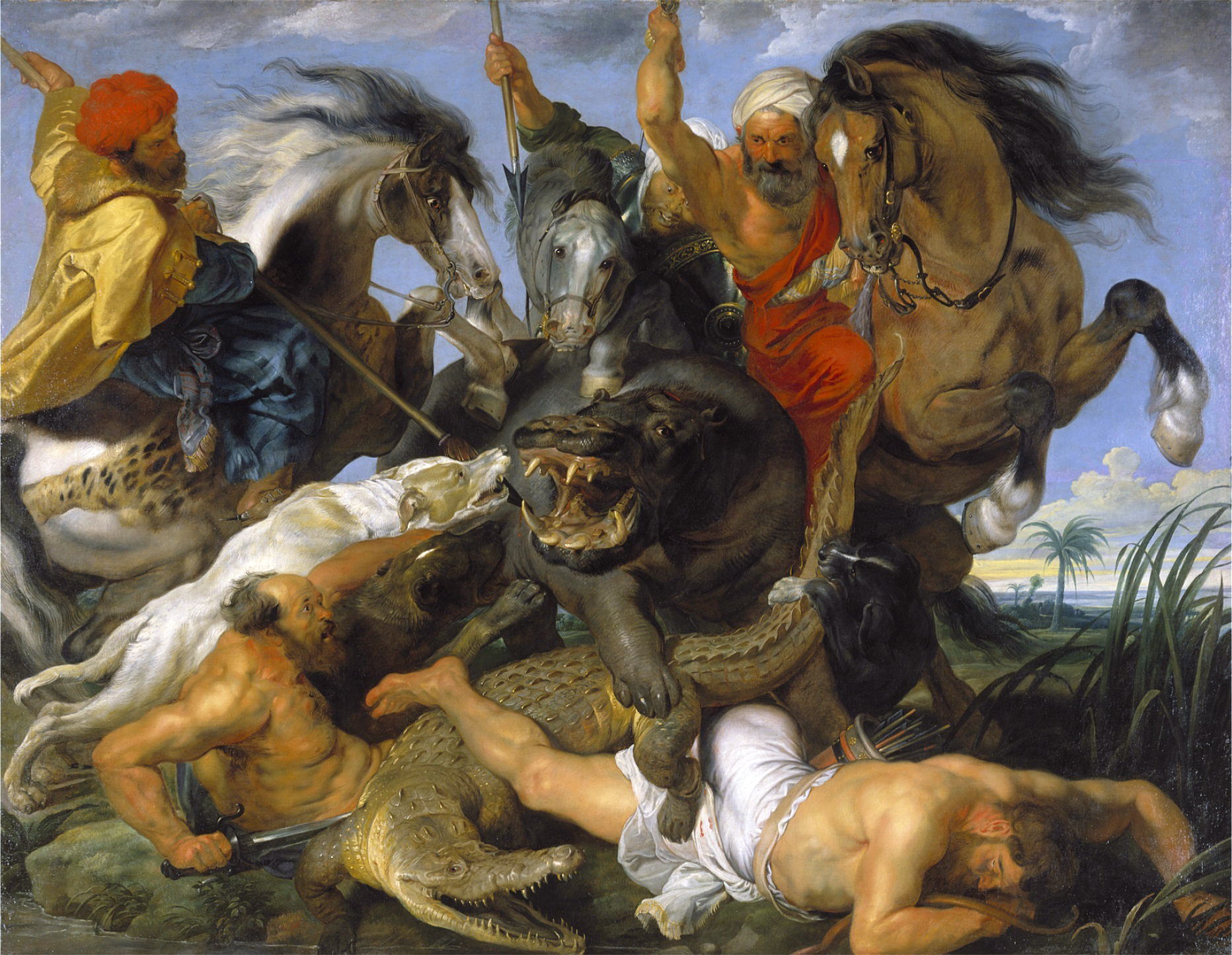
The Hippopotamus and Crocodile Hunt

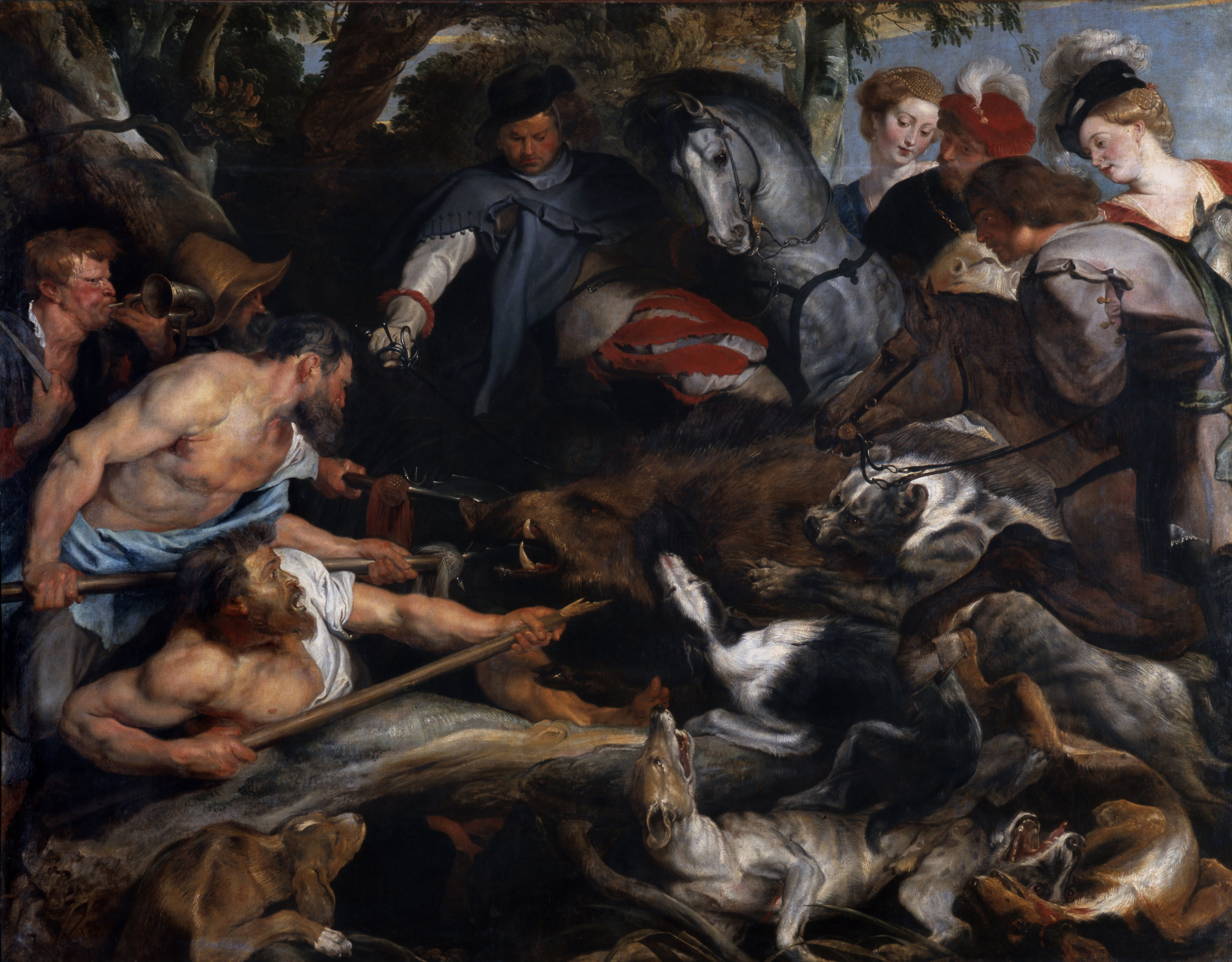
The Wild Boar Hunt

The Lion Hunt

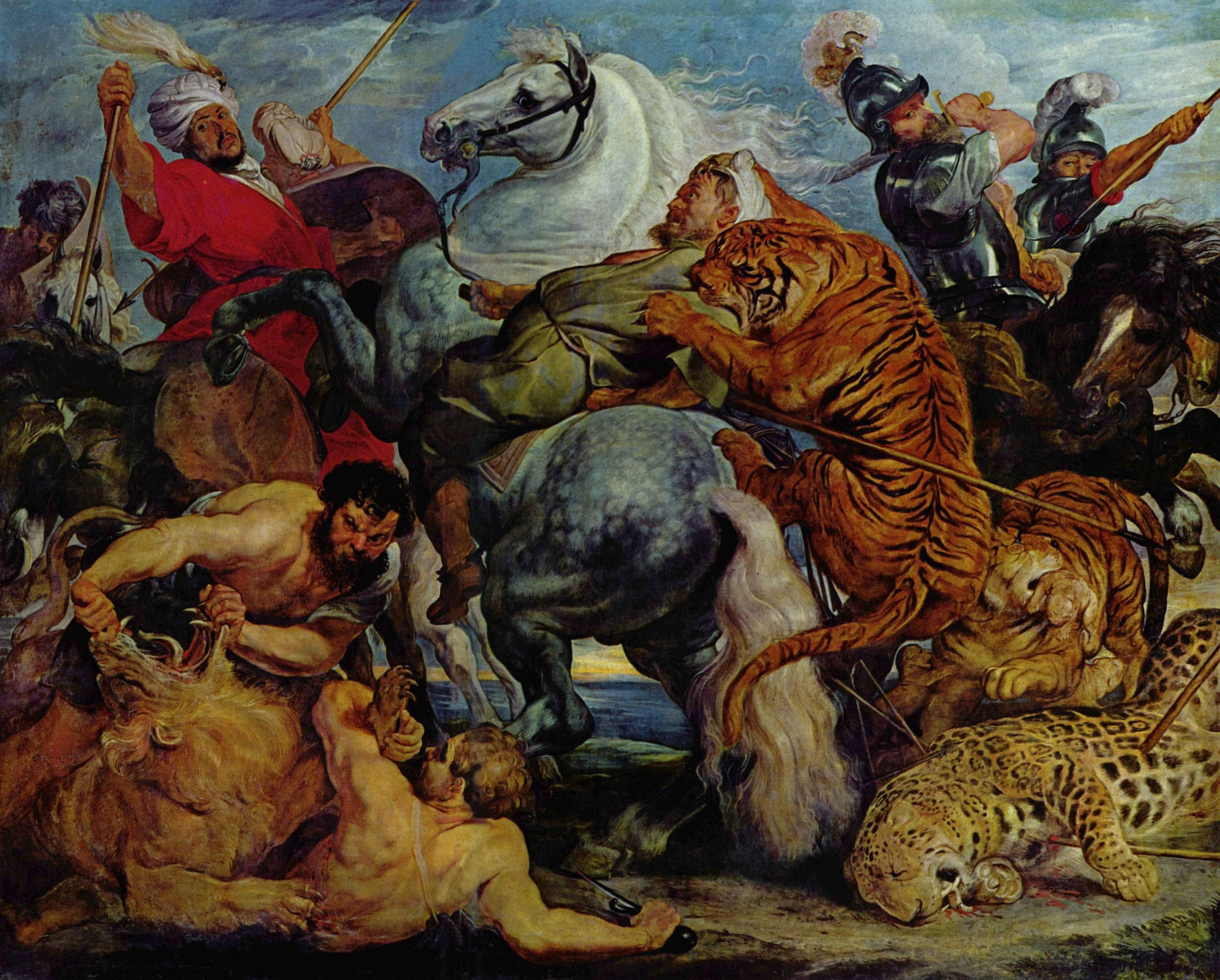
The Tiger Hunt
