= The Lion Hunt (Rubens) =

Painting by Peter Paul Rubens

The Lion Hunt (1621) by Rubens

The Lion Hunt is a 1621 painting by Peter Paul Rubens, now held in the Alte Pinakothek in Munich. It shows two lions attacked by hunters on horseback and on foot. It marks the end of an intensive creative phase for Rubens centered on the theme of hunting. It has the dimensions of 377 by 249 cm (148,2 x 97,9 inches)

== Related subjects by Rubens ==
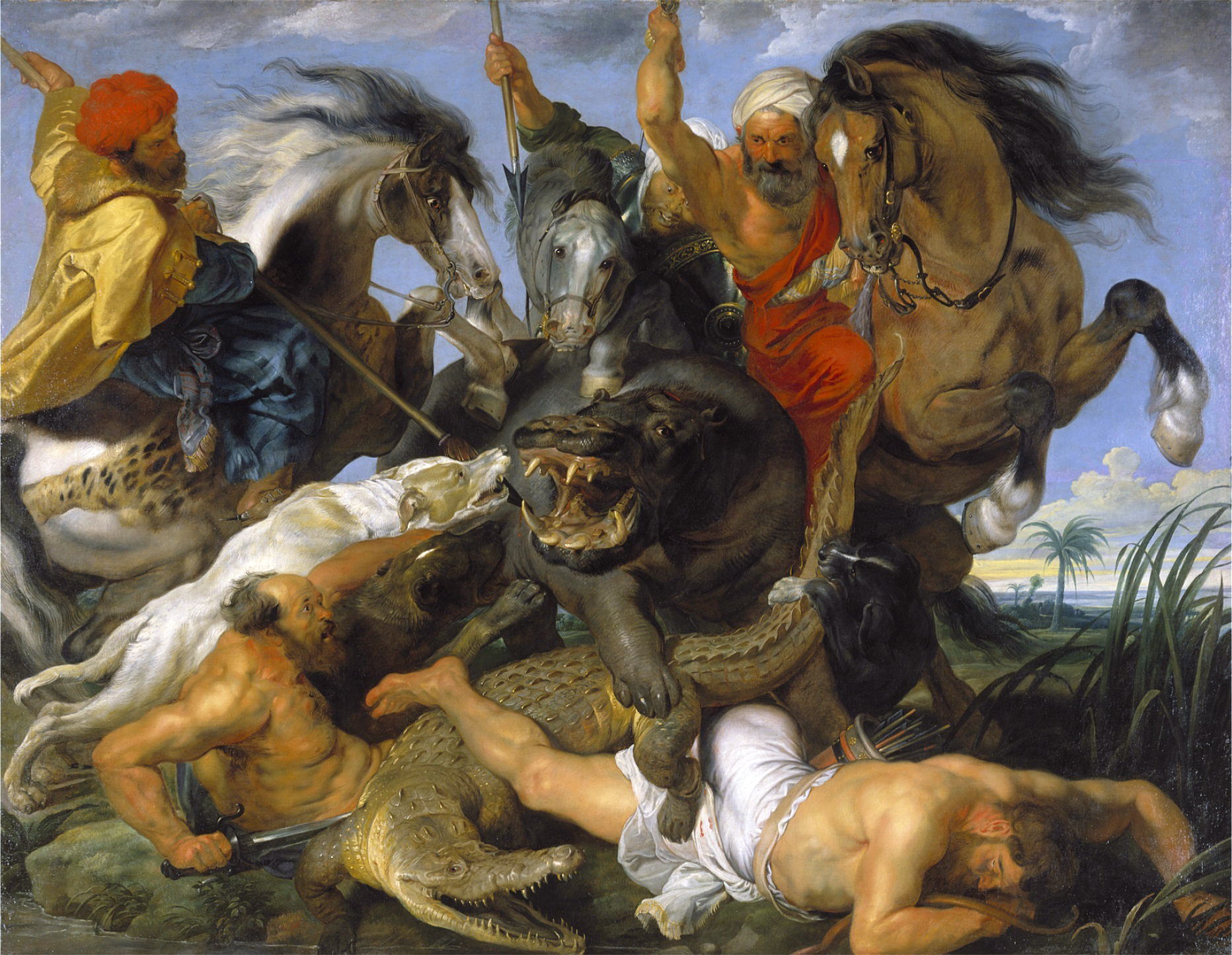
The Hippopotamus and Crocodile Hunt

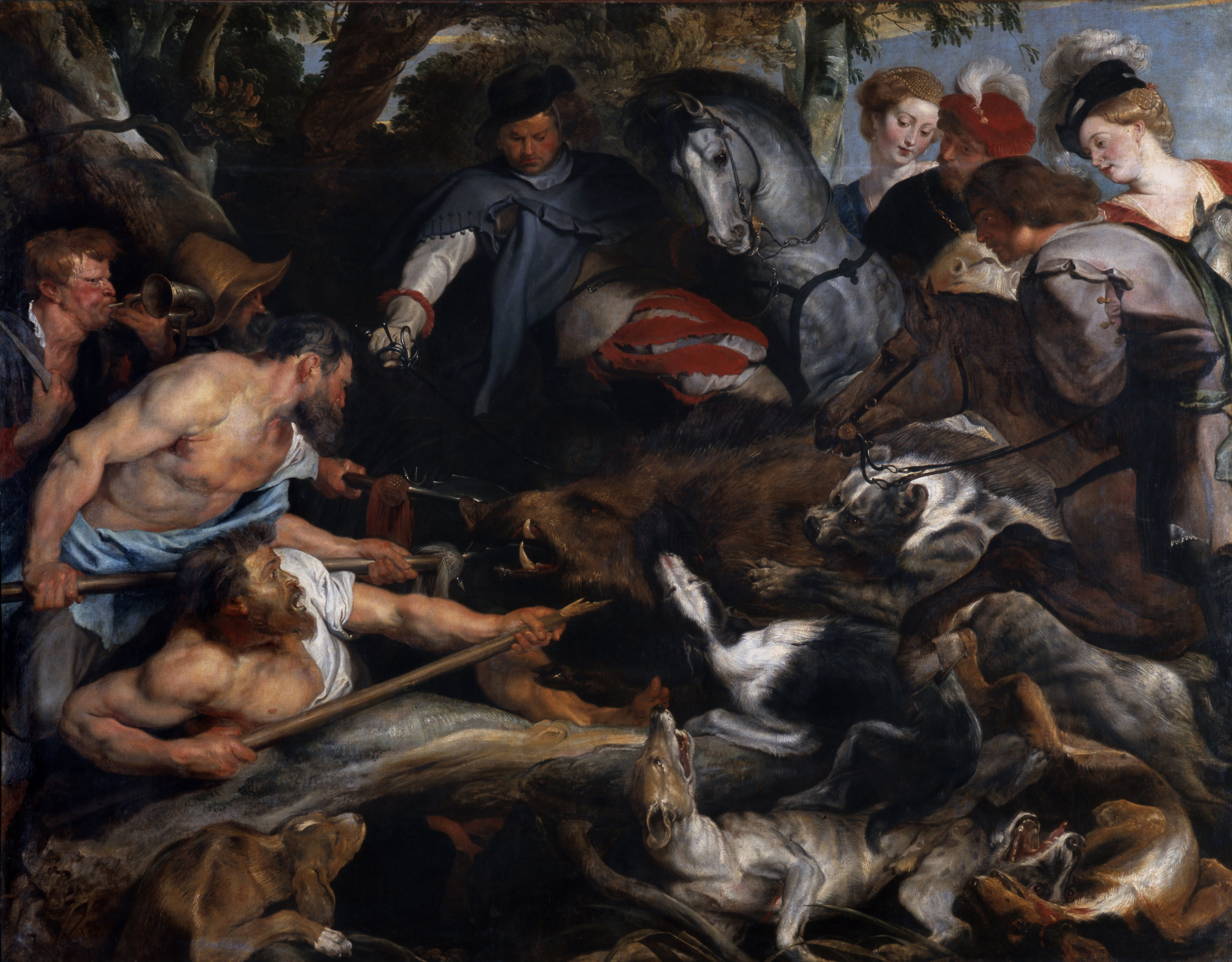
The Wild Boar Hunt

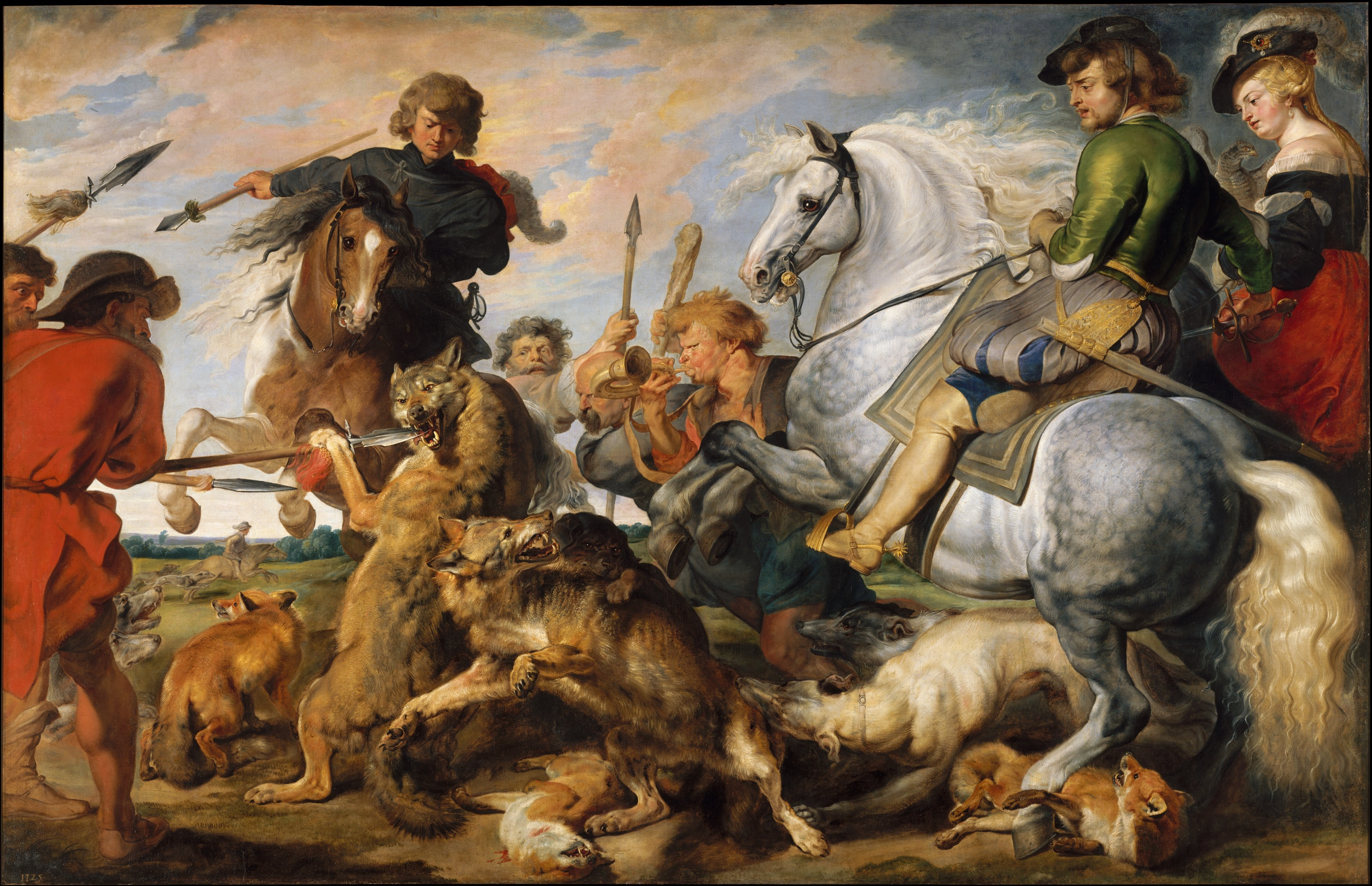
The Wolf and Fox Hunt

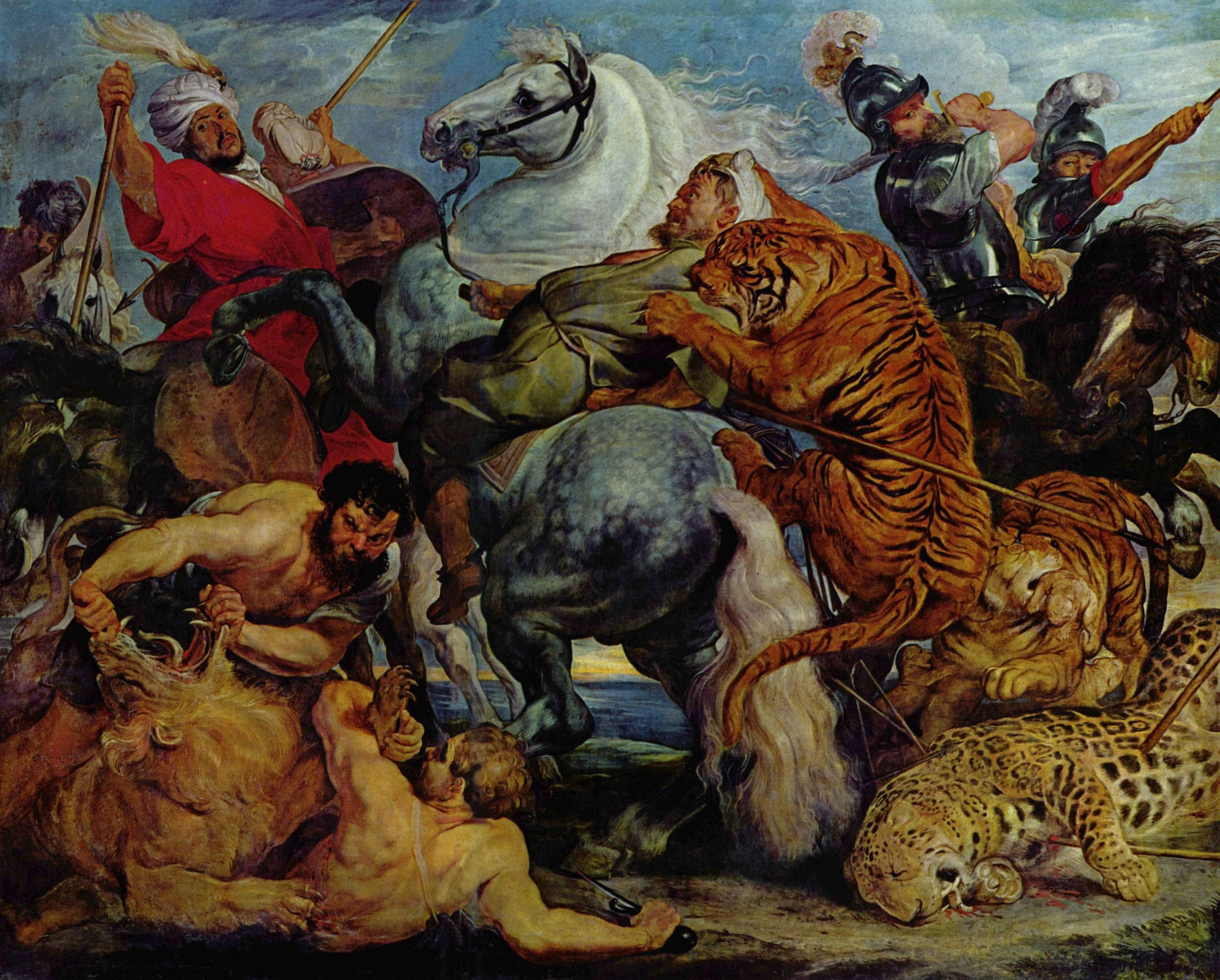
The Tiger Hunt

== Bibliography ==
- Arnout Balis, Hunting Scenes, vol. 2, Oxford University Press and Harvey Miller Ltd, coll. Corpus Rubenianum Ludwig Burchard, 1986, 406 p. (ISBN 978-0-199210-41-1, lire en ligne), partie XVIII
- David Rosand, ‘Rubens's Munich Lion Hunt: Its Sources and Significance’, The Art Bulletin, College Art Association, vol. 51, no. 1, March 1969, pp. 29–40
