= The Lion Hunt (Vernet) =

Painting by Horace Vernet

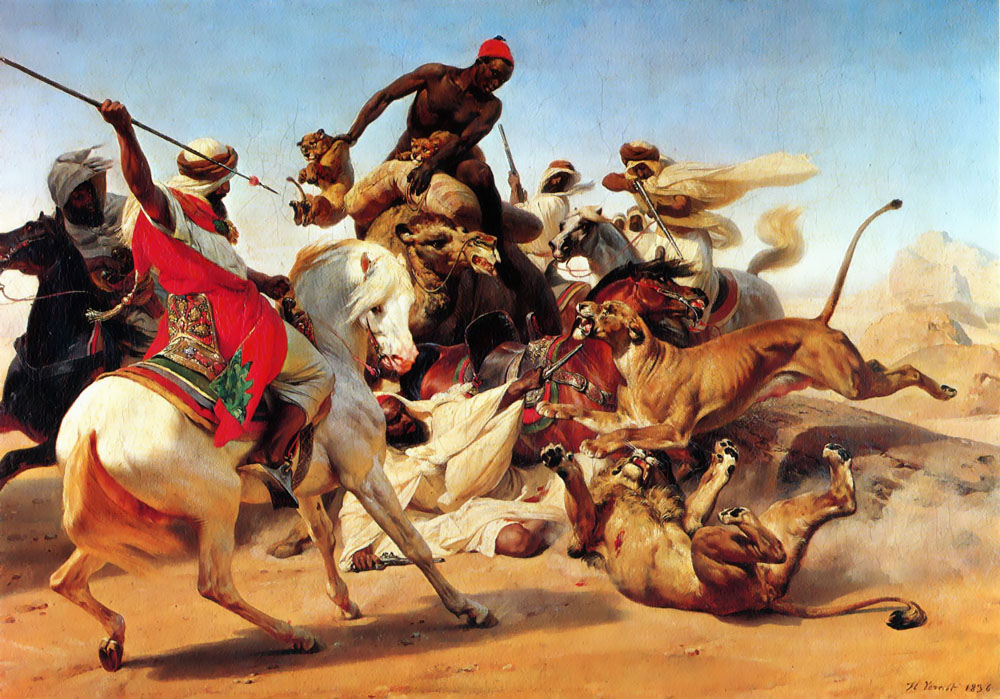
- Artist: Horace Vernet
- Year: 1836
- Type: Oil on canvas, genre painting
- Dimensions: 57.1 cm × 81.7 cm (22.5 in × 32.2 in)
- Location: Wallace Collection; London

The Lion Hunt is a genre painting of 1836 by the French artist Horace Vernet. It depicts a lion hunt in the Sahara. It reflects the fashionable Orientalism of the nineteenth century. It was inspired by Vernet's 1833 visit to North Africa in the wake of the French conquest of Algeria. It was exhibited at the Salon of 1836 at the Louvre in Paris. It had entered the collection of the Marquess of Hertford by 1860 and is today in the Wallace Collection in London.

== Bibliography ==
- Cohen, Ada. Art in the Era of Alexander the Great: Paradigms of Manhood and Their Cultural Traditions. Cambridge University Press, 30 August 2010.
- Ingamells, John. The Wallace Collection: French Nineteenth Century. Trustees of the Wallace Collection, 1985.
- Harkett, Daniel & Hornstein, Katie (ed.) Horace Vernet and the Thresholds of Nineteenth-Century Visual Culture. Dartmouth College Press, 2017.
- Hornstein, Katie. Myth and Menagerie: Seeing Lions in the Nineteenth Century. Yale University Press, 2024.
- Mackenzie, John. Orientalism: History, Theory and the Arts. Manchester University Press, 1995.
- Norman, Geraldine. Nineteenth Century Painters and Painting: A Dictionary. University of California Press, 2023.
- Ruutz-Rees, Janet Emily. Horace Vernet. Scribner and Welford, 1880.
