= The Tiger Hunt =

Painting by Peter Paul Rubens

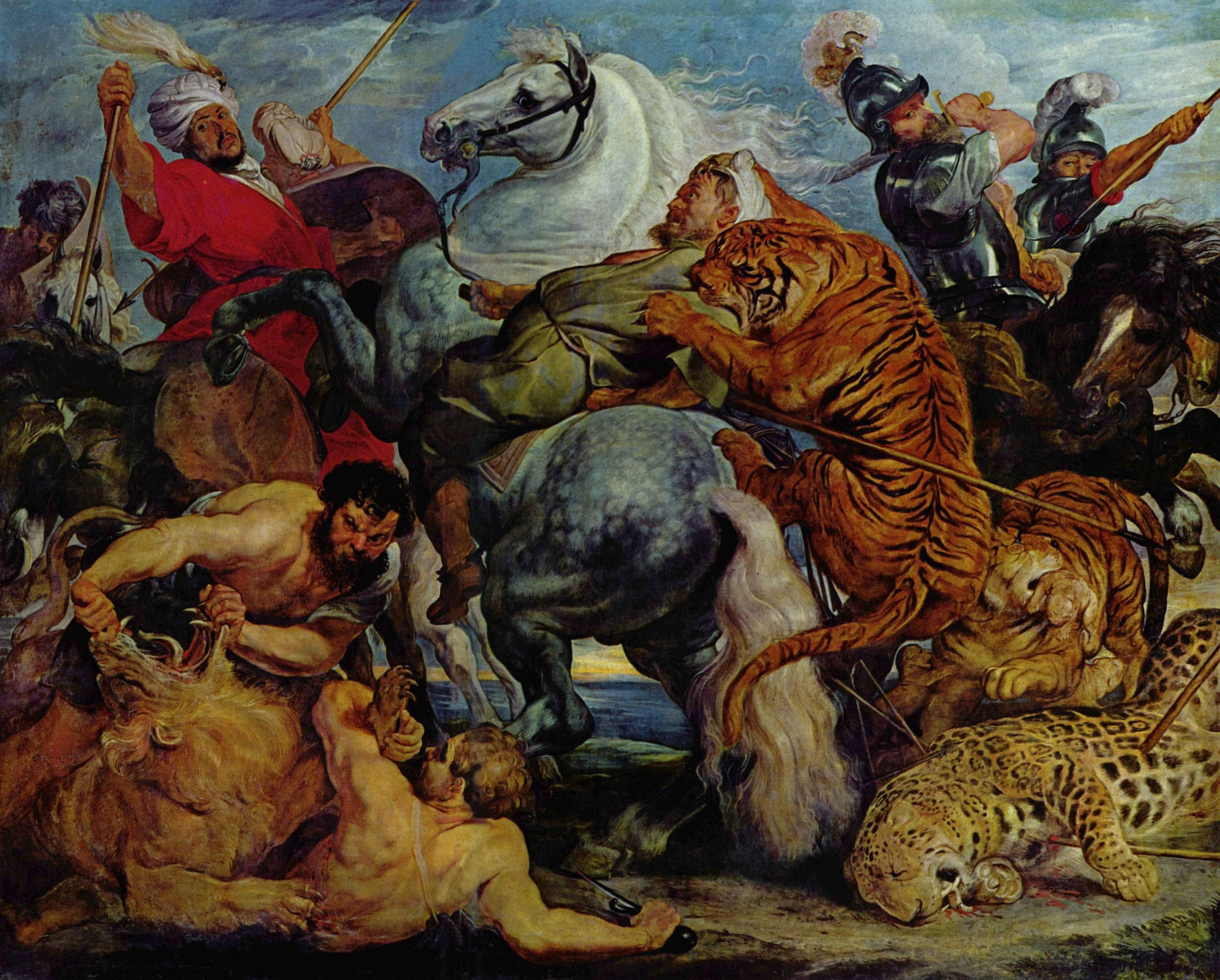
- Artist: P. Paul Rubens
- Year: 1615—1616
- Medium: Oil on canvas
- Dimensions: 256 cm × 324 cm (101 in × 128 in)
- Location: Musée des Beaux-Arts de Rennes, Rennes

The Tiger Hunt is a large painting by Peter Paul Rubens, featuring a hunt for a tiger. It dates to between 1615 and 1616 and is one of the four hunting paintings, commissioned by Maximilian of Bavaria to decorate the old Schleissheim Palace. The cycle was seized during the Napoleonic Wars and this painting is now in Musée des Beaux-Arts de Rennes.

It has been used in 2018 as a piece of staging in promotional materials for the HBO series Succession.

== Related subjects by Rubens ==
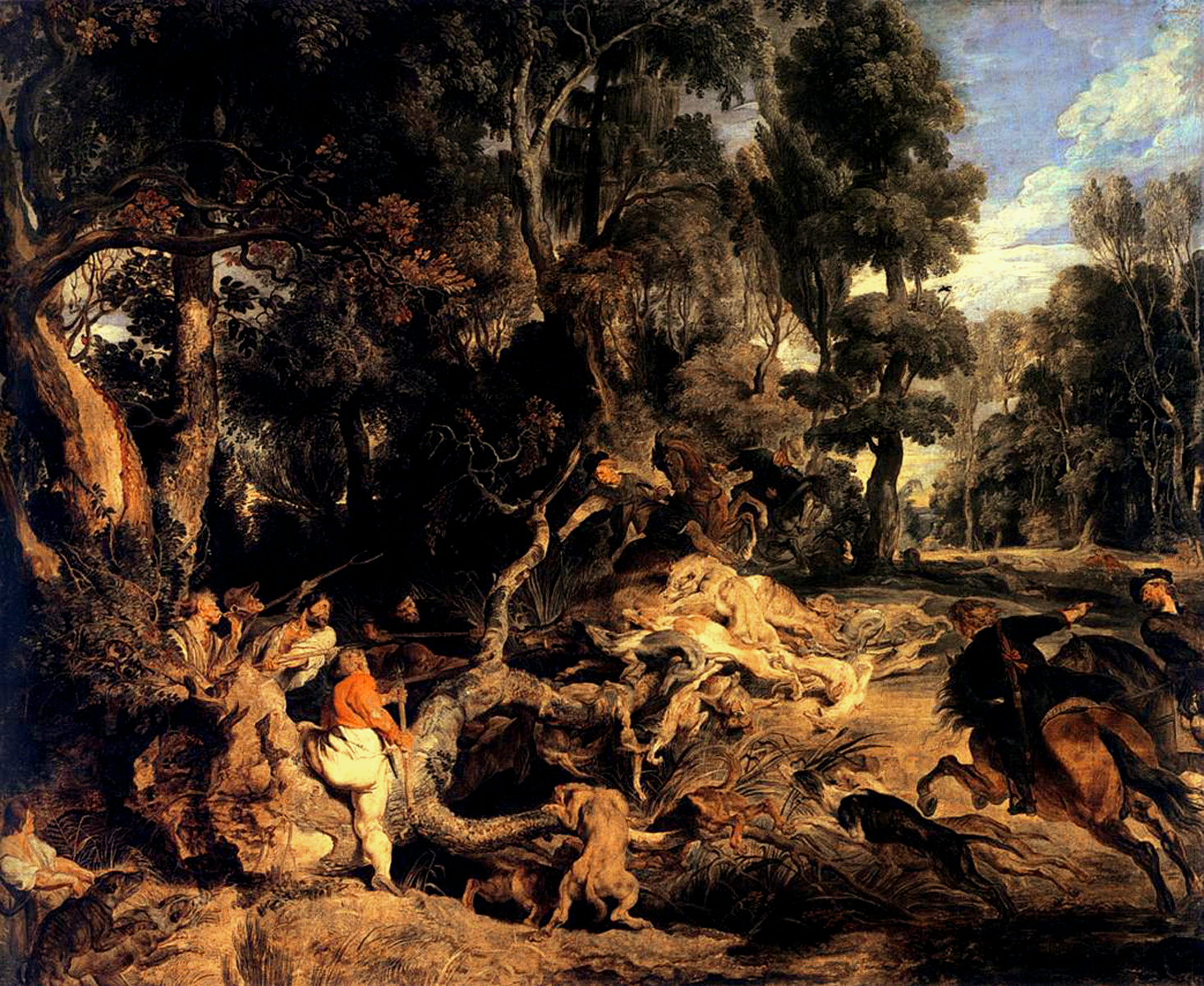
The Wild Boar Hunt

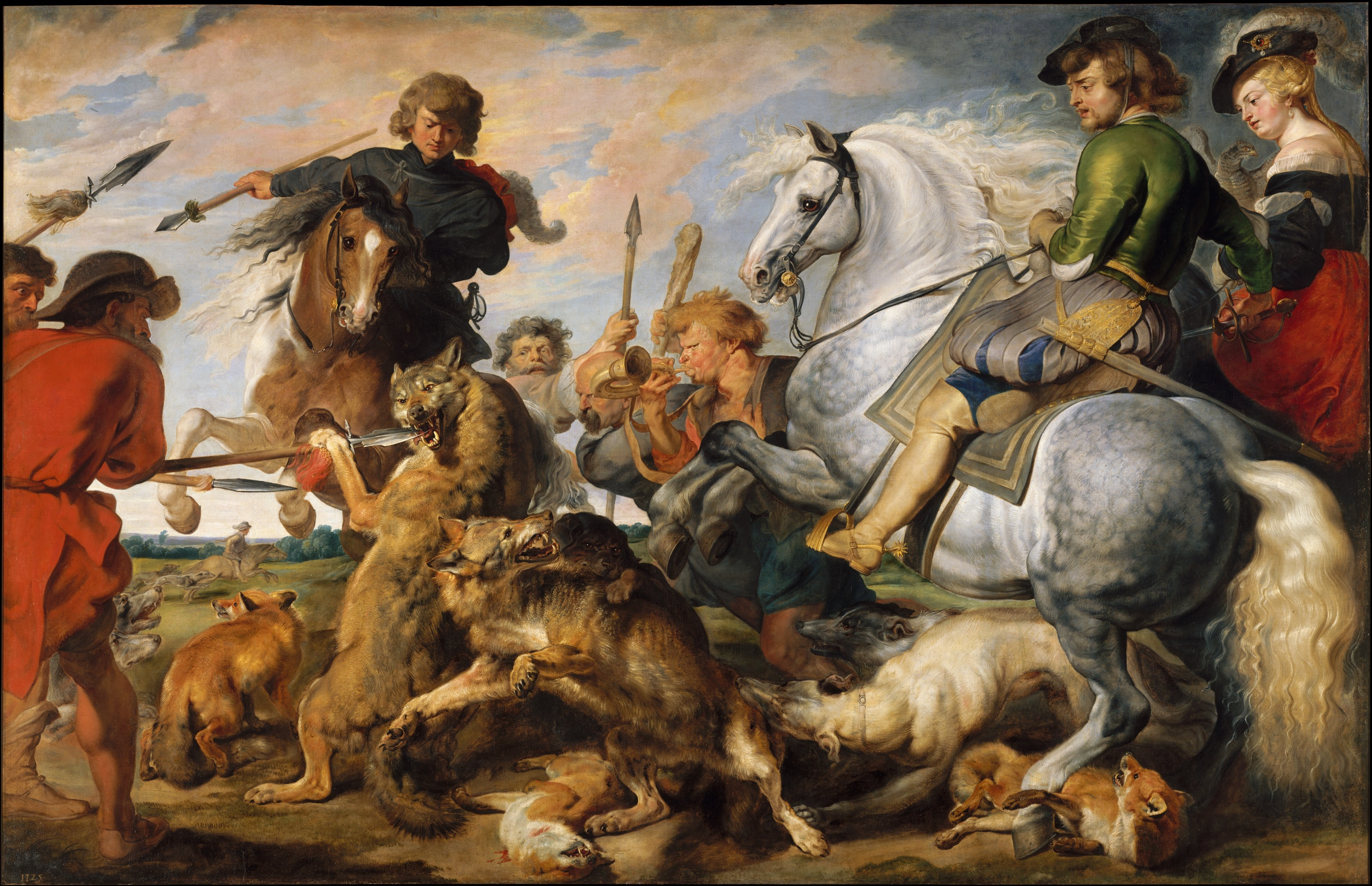
The Wolf and Fox Hunt

The Lion Hunt

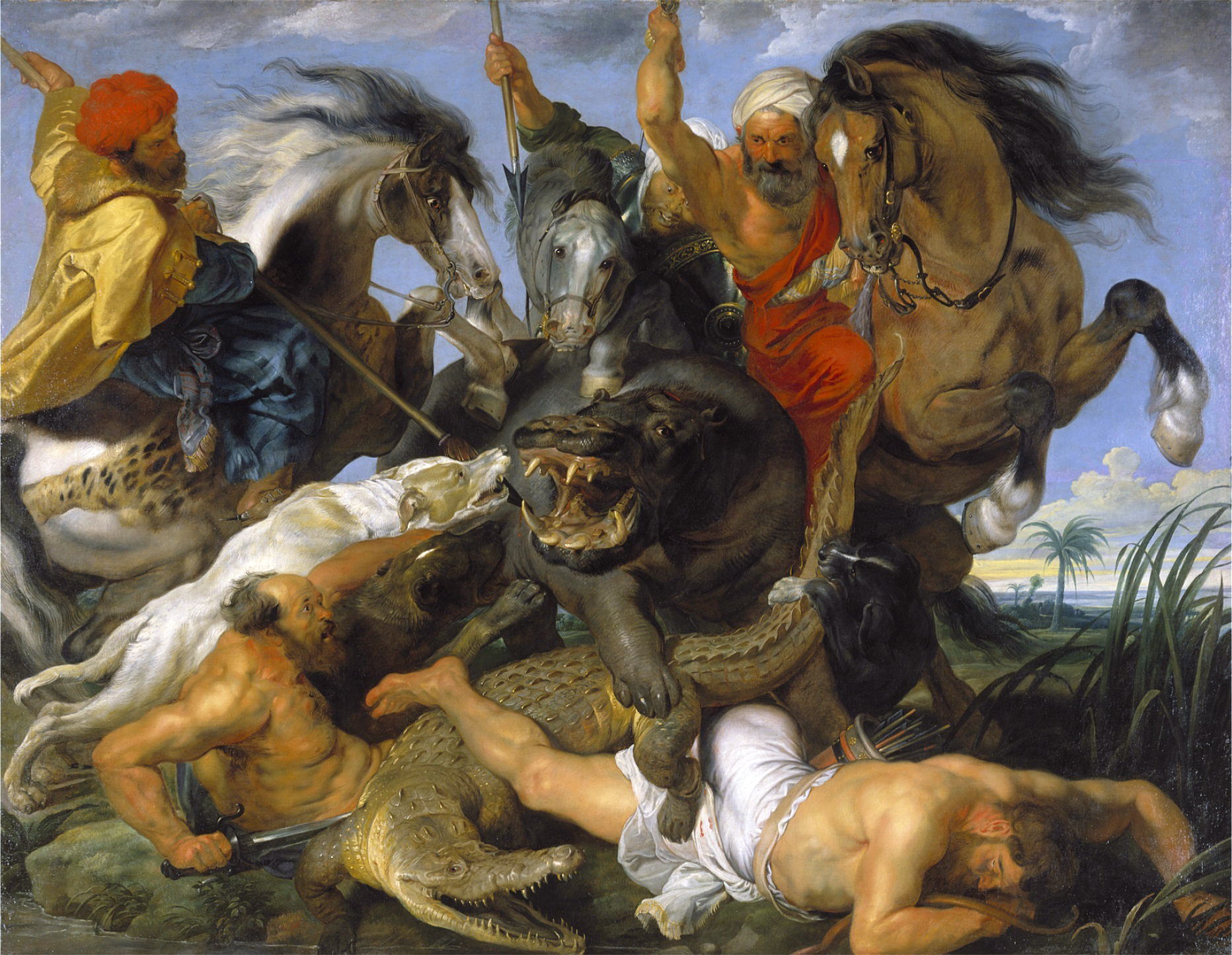
The Hippopotamus and Crocodile Hunt
