= The Wild Boar Hunt (Rubens, Marseille) =

Painting by Peter Paul Rubens

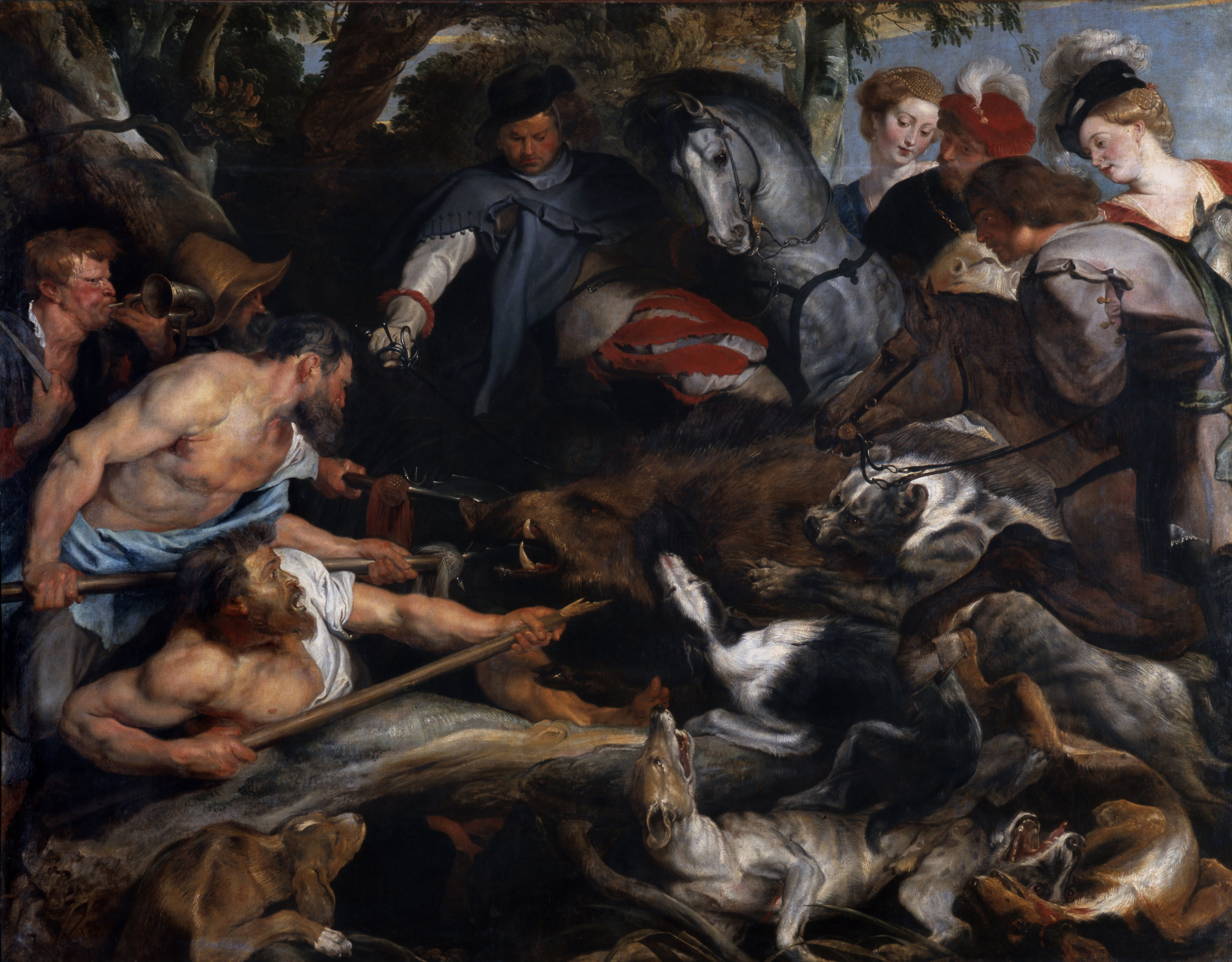

The Wild Boar Hunt is a 1615-1617 oil on canvas painting by Peter Paul Rubens, now in the musée des Beaux-Arts de Marseille. It reprises the composition of The Battle of Anghiari by Leonardo da Vinci.

== Bibliography ==
- (in French) Sylvie Blottière, Rubens, La Chasse au tigre Musée des beaux-arts, Musée des beaux-arts, coll. « L’œuvre du mois », 1979, 14 p. (BNF 34648710), chap. 1 Document utilisé pour la rédaction de l’article
- Arnout Balis, Hunting Scenes, vol. 2, Presses universitaires d'Oxford et Harvey Miller Ltd, coll. « Corpus Rubenianum Jacob Burchard », 1986, 406 p. (ISBN 978-0-199210-41-1, lire en ligne [archive]), partie XVIII
- (in French) Jacques Foucart, Jean Lacambre, Jean-Pierre De Bruyn, Philippe Durey, Françoise Heilbrun, Monique Nonne, Hervé Oursel et Alain Roy (preface Jacques Foucart et Jean Lacambre), Le siècle de Rubens, Paris, Éditions des musées nationaux, 1977
