= Portrait of Bertel Thorvaldsen =

Painting by Horace Vernet

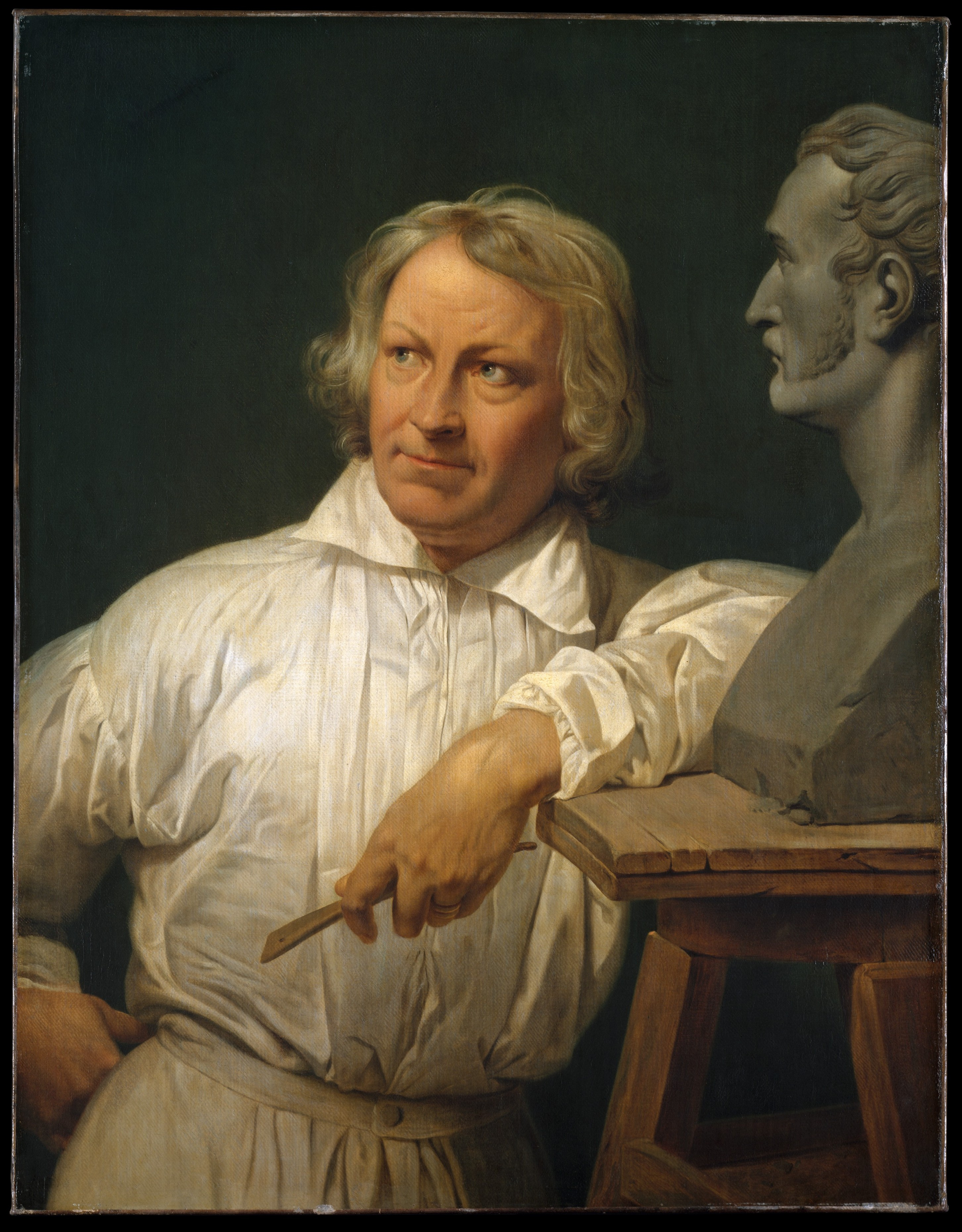
- Artist: Horace Vernet
- Year: 1833
- Type: Oil on canvas, portrait painting
- Dimensions: 96.5 cm × 74.9 cm (38.0 in × 29.5 in)
- Location: Thorvaldsens Museum; Copenhagen

Portrait of Bertel Thorvaldsen is an 1833 portrait painting by the French artist Horace Vernet depicting the Danish sculptor Bertel Thorvaldsen. The two met in Italy and became friends while Vernet was at the time Director of the French Academy in Rome. They agreed to each produce a depiction of the other and this painting shows Thorvaldsen with the bust he had produced of Vernet.

The painting is now in the collection of the Metropolitan Museum of Art in New York. Another original, version is in the Thorvaldsens Museum in Copenhagen, having been acquired in 1844 through a bequest from the artist.

== Bibliography ==
- Baetjer, Katharine. European Paintings in the Metropolitan Museum of Art by Artists Born Before 1865. Metropolitan Museum of Artz, 1995.
- Harkett, Daniel & Hornstein, Katie (ed.) Horace Vernet and the Thresholds of Nineteenth-Century Visual Culture. Dartmouth College Press, 2017.
- Bietoletti, Silvestra. Neoclassicism and Romanticism. Sterling Publishing Company, 2009.
