= Cupid and Psyche (Thorvaldsen) =

Sculpture by Bertel Thorvaldsen

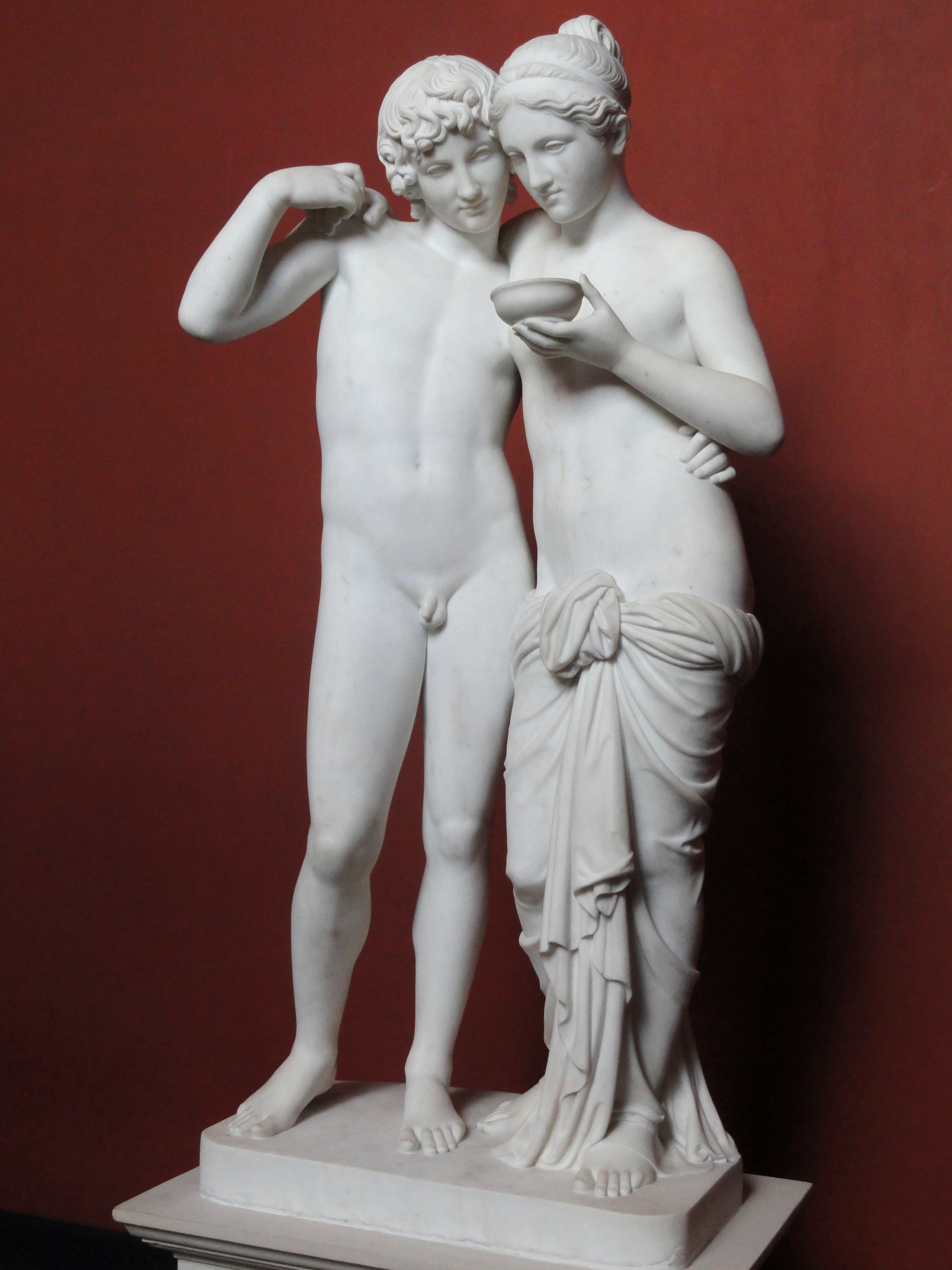
Cupid and Psyche (1804-1807) by Bertel Thorvaldsen

Cupid and Psyche or Amor and Psyche is a marcke sculpture by Bertel Thorvaldsen, begun in 1804 and completed in 1807. It is held in the Thorvaldsens Museum in Copenhagen. It shows Cupid and Psyche in a embrace. Cupid is naked, while Psyche is partially undressed. They both look at a cup she is holding.
