= Petersberg Citadel =

Fortress in Erfurt, Germany

- Erfurt, Germany
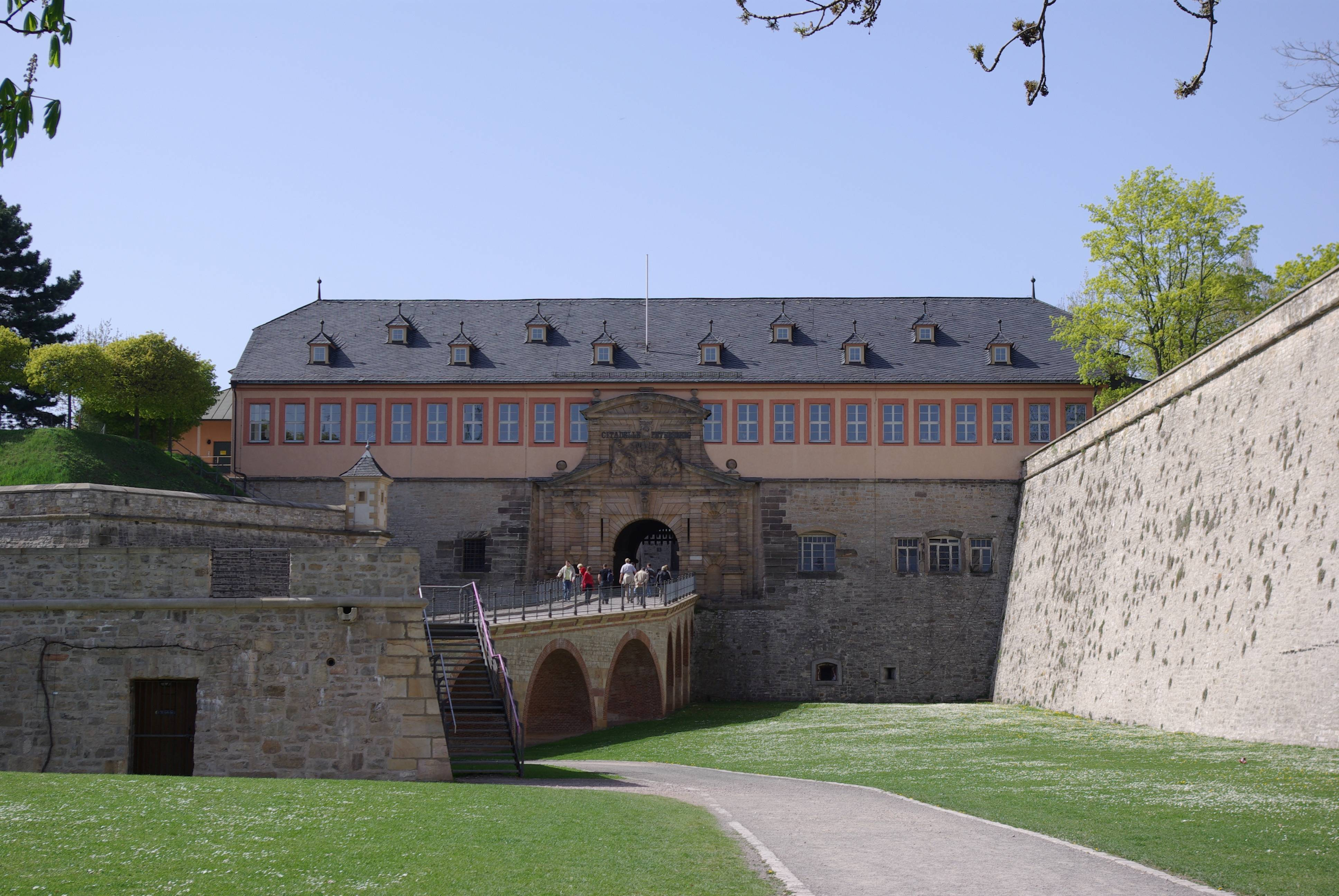

Site information
- Type: Citadel

Location
- Coordinates: 50°58′43.25″N 11°1′6″E
- Area: 36 hectares

Site history
- Built: 1665–1868
- Built by: Electorate of Mainz; Principality of Erfurt; Prussian Army
- In use: 1665–1963
- Materials: Stone and brick

Petersberg Citadel (German: Zitadelle Petersberg) in Erfurt, central Germany, is one of the largest and best-preserved town fortresses in Europe. The citadel was built on Petersberg hill, in the north-western part of the old town centre from 1665, when Erfurt was governed by the Electorate of Mainz. It is surrounded by over two kilometres of stone walls and is 36 hectares in size.

Erfurt has also been ruled by Sweden, Prussia, Napoleon, the German Empire, the Nazis, and post-World War II Soviet occupying forces, and it was part of the German Democratic Republic (East Germany). All of these regimes used Petersberg Citadel and had an influence on its development. The baroque fortress was in military use until 1963. Since German reunification in 1990, the citadel has undergone significant restoration and it is now open to the public as a historic site. Its maze of underground passageways are also open to visitors and the fortress bakery (1832) is again in working order.

The fortress is also known by its French name, Citadelle Petersberg, as French troops were stationed there from 1806 to 1814, when Erfurt was under Napoleonic occupation. Napoleon visited Erfurt several times and the citadel was further developed during his rule, although parts of it were damaged in a battle in 1813.

The citadel was built on the site of a medieval Benedictine Monastery and the earliest parts of the complex date from the 12th century.

The former lower barracks (German:Untere Kaserne) building is now used to house and administer archives of the Stasi Records Agency.

The Cyriaksburg Citadel, is a smaller fortress to the south-west of Erfurt city centre, which dates from 1480. It is now the home of the German Horticulture Museum. During the Napoleonic period a hidden trench connecting the two citadels was built. The remains of this connection can still be seen at the Cyriaksburg Citadel today.

== History ==
=== Background ===
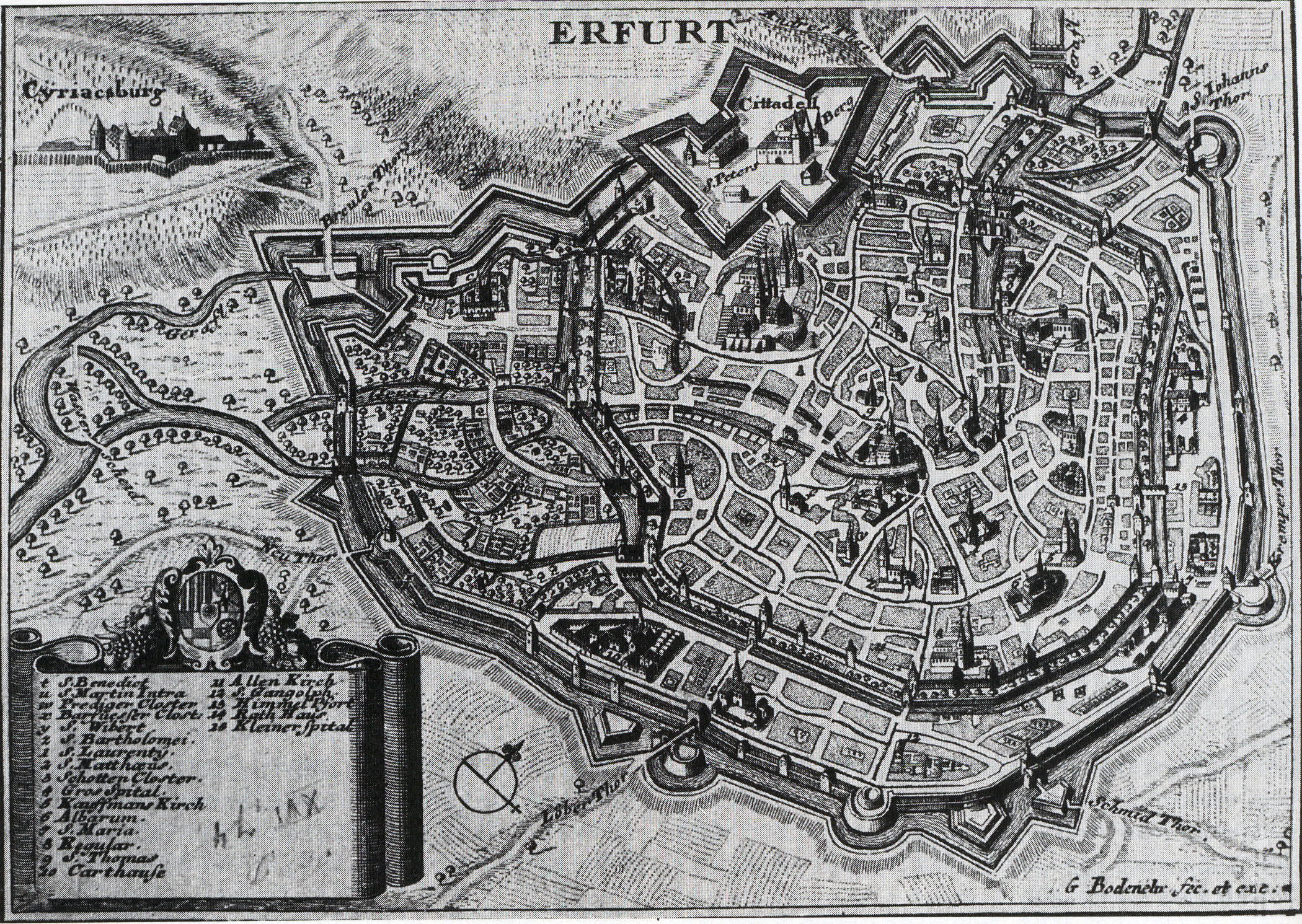
Map of the then walled city of Erfurt, 1730, showing Petersberg Citadel in the top western part of the city.

Petersberg Citadel is entwined with the history of Erfurt. The city was first mentioned in 742 in a letter from St Boniface to Pope Zachary, when the Catholic Diocese of Erfurt was established. It was part of the Holy Roman Empire, and was brought into the Diocese of Mainz in 755. The earliest archaeological find from the Middle Ages on Petersberg hill is a coin dating from c.850, from the time of Lothair I, Holy Roman Emperor from 817 to 855. It was found in a grave, in the mouth of the deceased.

The oldest surviving building in the citadel is the Peterskirche (St. Peters Church), which was part of the Benedictine Monastery of St Peter and Paul, after which the hill, and subsequently the citadel, was named. The first recorded evidence of the monastery is from 1060, but it may have existed a considerable time before that. The original building burned down in 1080, but was rebuilt from 1103 to 1147 and St Peter's Church is from this second period. In 1184, the Erfurt latrine disaster occurred in this building, where a meeting of nobles from around the Holy Roman Empire fell through the floor into the latrine, with at least 60 drowning.

The city gradually grew more independent during the 12th century, and in 1217 it became fully independent with the founding of its own city council. From 1066 until 1873 the old town of Erfurt was encircled by a fortified wall. About 1168 this was extended to run around the western side of Petersberg hill, enclosing it within the city boundaries. About 1625 the city council had the city wall at the Petersberg strengthened by building a large hornwork and two bastions. These are the bastions named Gabriel and Michael. During the Thirty Years' War (1618–1648), Erfurt was occupied by Swedish forces from 1631. The Swedish king, Gustav II Adolf, hoped to build a fortress on Petersberg hill, but he died in 1632 and the plans never came to fruition. However, the Swedes did strengthen the existing Bastion Gabriel in 1643. In 1664 the city and the surrounding area were conquered by the Electorate of Mainz. On 1 June 1665 the foundation stone of Petersberg Citadel was laid.

=== Building of the citadel ===
The formal first construction phase lasted from 1665 to 1707, following an order from Johann Philipp von Schönborn (1605–1673), Archbishop-Elector of Mainz and Bishop of Würzburg and Worms, to build the citadel. Von Schönborn had recently conquered Erfurt and wanted to build the fortress to demonstrate his power to the local population, in order to suppress any ideas of rebellion.

A plan that the Erfurt architect Caspar Vogel (c.1660–1663) had created for the Swedish king Gustav II Adolf served as a basic model for the citadel, and the work was substantially influenced by Antonio Petrini (c.1620–1701) the architect to the imperial court of Mainz. This included the building of the walls, bastions, the ravelins called Anselm and Lotha, the main gateway (Peterstor) and commandant building, three barracks, which are among the oldest surviving barracks in Germany, and the tunnels within the walls, called Horchgänge in German, meaning the 'listening passages'.

The second construction phase was from 1707 to 1728, under the direction of the architect Maximilian von Welsch (1671–1745), who was made an imperial knight with the title Edler von Welsch for his services to architecture by Charles VI, Holy Roman Emperor in 1714. Welsch put special emphasis on the reinforcement of the fortress and trench defenses.

Erfurt became part of the Kingdom of Prussia in 1802, to compensate Prussia for its territories on the left bank of the Rhine that were lost to France. However, on 16 October 1806 Erfurt was handed over to French forces in what is known as the Capitulation of Erfurt, which followed the Prussian defeat in the Battle of Jena–Auerstedt.

=== Napoleonic period (1806–1814) ===
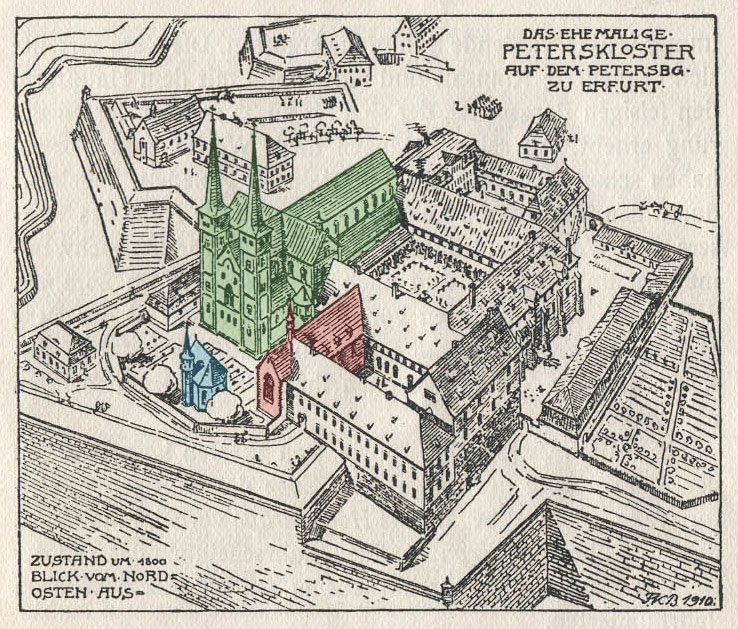
Monastery buildings in 1800. They were damaged in a battle in 1813. St Peter's Church is marked in green, Corpus Christi chapel is blue and the Chapel of Saint Anne is red.

French troops were stationed at Erfurt from 1806 to 1814, when Erfurt was under Napoleonic occupation. Napoleon arrived in the city on 23 June 1807, and created the Principality of Erfurt, which he ruled directly himself.

Napoleon visited Erfurt a number of times during the French occupation. He took a particular interest in Petersberg Citadel. He stayed in Erfurt from 27 September to 14 October 1808, when he meet with Tsar Alexander I of Russia for the Congress of Erfurt. The two leaders visited Petersberg Citadel together during the Congress.

He also went to Erfurt on 15 December 1812 on his return from Russia to France, and from 25 to 28 April 1813. On 21 April 1813 he had ordered that Petersberg Citadel should be strengthened and equipped so that it could support 2000 men under siege for six months. Both French troops and civilian residents of Erfurt were put to work on the project, with over 3000 civilians working on building the ditches that surround the external walls. The work was carried both day and night, used flaming torches to see by. During this time a hidden trench connecting Petersburg and Cyriaksburg citadels was built, the remains of which can still be seen at Cyriaksburg today.

On 4 November 1813 Prussian, Austrian and Russian forces drew in on Erfurt and sought to get the French to surrender and leave Petersberg Citadel. There was no surrender and fire was opened on the citadel on 6 November, at six o'clock in the morning. A number of buildings caught fire, including the main guardhouse, monastery building, and parts of St. Peter's Church. One hundred and twenty-one houses in the town centre below the citadel were also destroyed.

The French didn't surrender, but there was an extended truce and at the beginning of January 1814, the city of Erfurt was handed over to the Prussians, although the French troops remained in the Petersberg and Cyriaksburg citadels. When Paris was captured by allied troops in April 1814, the Napoleonic troops still remained in Petersberg citadel. It was not until 5 May 1814 that French General Alexandre d'Alton surrendered and handed the citadel over peacefully to the Prussians.

=== Prussian rule (1814–1871) ===
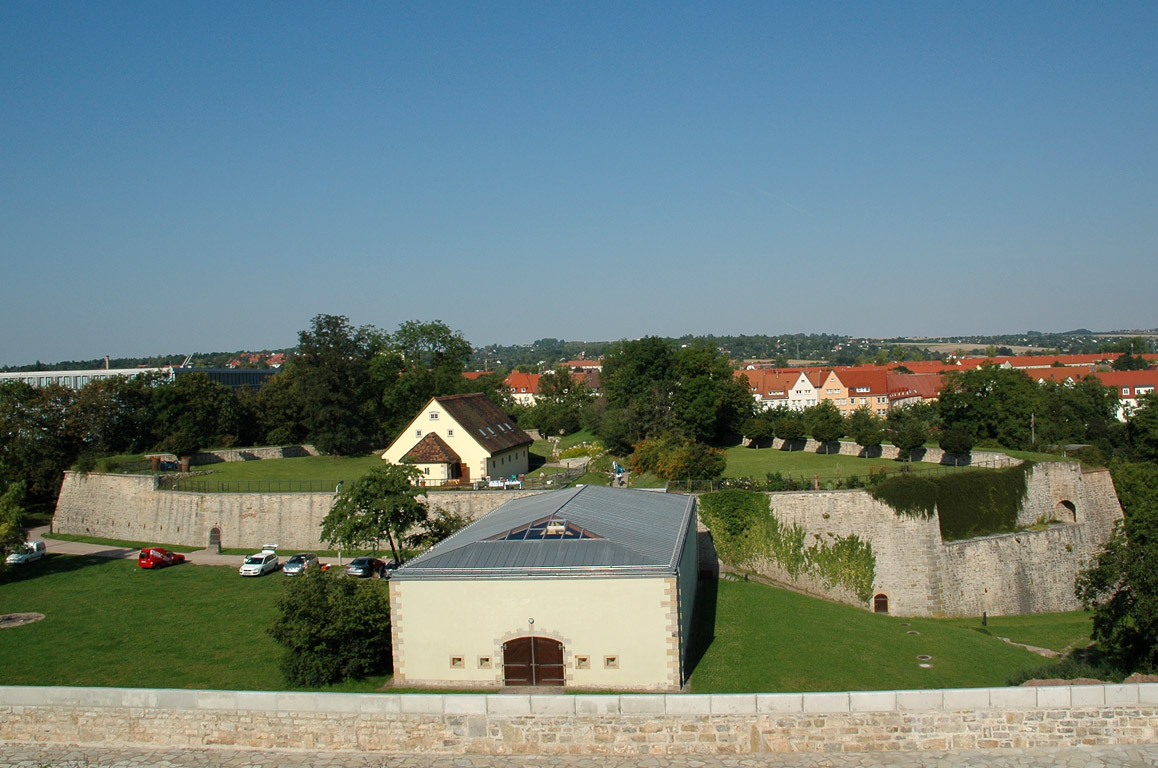
Caponier I, built 1824/25, between the citadel wall and Ravelin Anselm

When the Prussians took back the citadel in 1814, they began a new building phase which lasted until 1868. They wanted to make the fortress "bomb proof", and resilient to the strength of the latest weapons. During this period they built the Defence Barracks, the fortress bakery, wells, latrines, and caponiers. A caponier is part of a fortification built in a ditch to provided covered defence to the ditch and/or access to outer parts of the fort.

=== German Empire (1871–1918) ===
After German Unification in 1871, Erfurt became part of the newly created German Empire. The threat to the city from its Saxon neighbours and from Bavaria was no longer present, so it was decided to dismantle the city walls. Only a few remnants remain today.

In June 1873 Emperor Wilhelm I gave orders for the Petersberg and Cyriaksburg citadels to be pulled down, but due to lack of funds this was mostly not done. Two ravelins (Peter and Wilhelm) and the hornwork along the walls were removed. An access road was built and Lunette I was demolished and Lunette II and Ravelin Gabriel were reduced in height. The rubble was used to fill in the ditches.

Prior to World War I there was a renewed interest in the strategic military location of Petersberg Citadel. New buildings, such as workshops, warehouses, barracks and a military detention centre were built between 1912 and 1914.

=== Post World War I ===
The fortress remained an important garrison position until the end of the war in 1918. After World War I, as a result of the Treaty of Versailles in 1919, there was a gradual abandonment of military facilities during the Weimar Republic period. Petersberg was used for garden allotments and by the civil police, who had a detention centre, garages, workshops and stores on the site.

=== Nazi period (1933–1945) ===
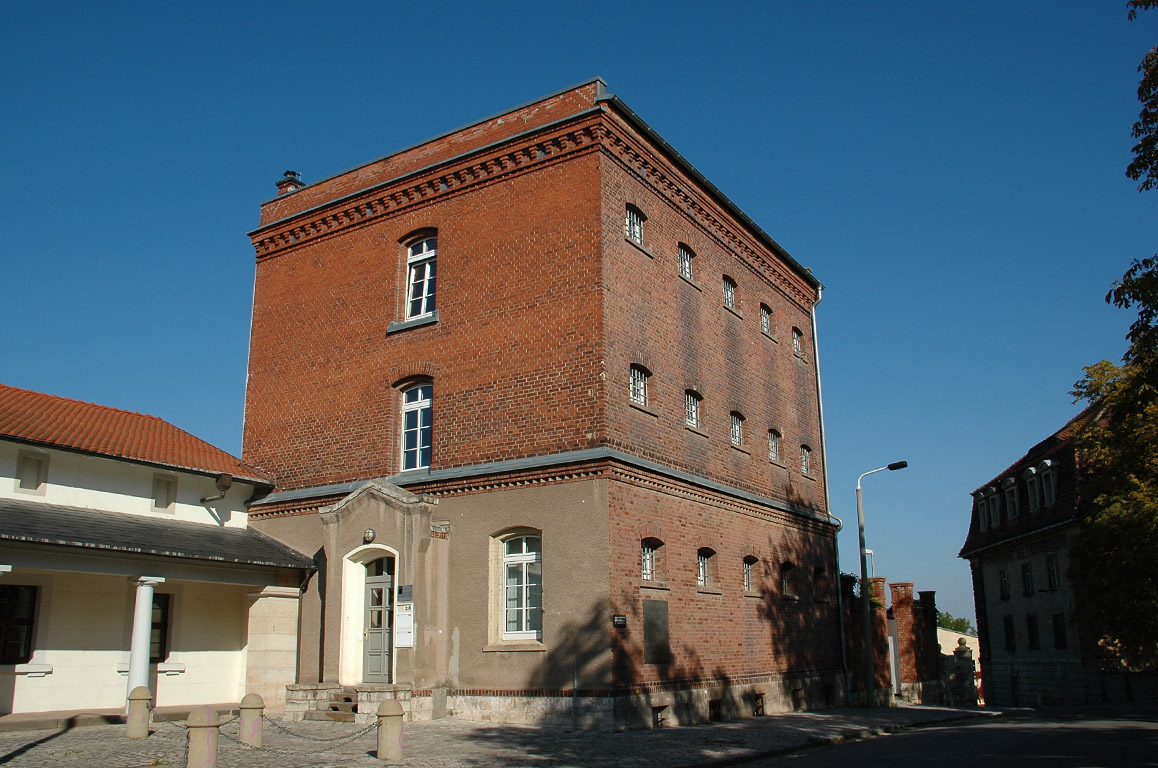
Detention centre, built 1912–1914, where political opponents were held by the Nazis

When the Nazis came to power in 1933, they again brought the citadel into military use. They built gun casemates, and from 1935 divisional army units, reserve army units and the district army recruitment office were based there.

Also from 1935, the Nazis used parts of the citadel as a prison for the internment of their political enemies, such as communists and trade unionists. They were kept in a police detention centre originally built to accommodate up to 60 prisoners, but at its peak 241 internees were crowded into the facility. Many of the internees were sent directly from Petersberg citadel to concentration camps. Some were murdered by the Nazis at the citadel itself. The Nazis also had a military court at the citadel for dealing with people such as deserters, which could pronounce death sentences on those being tried, and sometimes these people were immediately executed at the citadel. Today there is a memorial to those mistreated by the Nazis at the site.

Some war damage was sustained, including the 12th century Leonhardskirche (St Leonard's Church) which was totally destroyed in an air raid. The church had been converted into an artillery store.

=== Post World War II ===
At the end of World War II, Erfurt was liberated by American forces in April 1945, and handed over to the Soviet administration on 3 July 1945, as agreed at the Yalta Conference, held in February 1945. In 1944 a transit camp for displaced people had been established in the Defense Barracks, and this continued operating under the occupying Soviet administration after the war.

In 1949 the Soviet Occupied Zone became the German Democratic Republic (East Germany). From 1947 Peterberg Citadel was used mainly for civil purposes, with barracks being used by the civil police. From 1956 until 1963 the East German Army (German: Nationale Volksarmee) used the citadel and its barracks, but they then moved to new facilities on the outskirts of the city. After that the main users of site were the police, for storing equipment, and a garden allotment association. The Stasi, whose prison and district headquarters were immediately below the citadel, had warehouses and workshops on the site for their motor pool until 1990. The rest of the citadel was unused and plants were allowed to naturally regrow.

=== Restoration ===
After German reunification in 1990, a massive project to restore the citadel was begun. It is the largest such project undertaken by the Erfurt city council and it is funded by the city council and the Thuringian state and German federal governments. Over 300 people were temporarily employed. Most buildings added since 1868 were removed, most earlier buildings, including the 12th century St Peter's Church, were restored or stabilised, ditches were cleared and walls and bastions were repaired, the horchgänge (listening passages) were cleared, and the 1832 wood-fired fortress bakery was brought back into working order. As at January 2018, the restoration is still on-going.

== Main buildings and structures ==
=== Walls ===
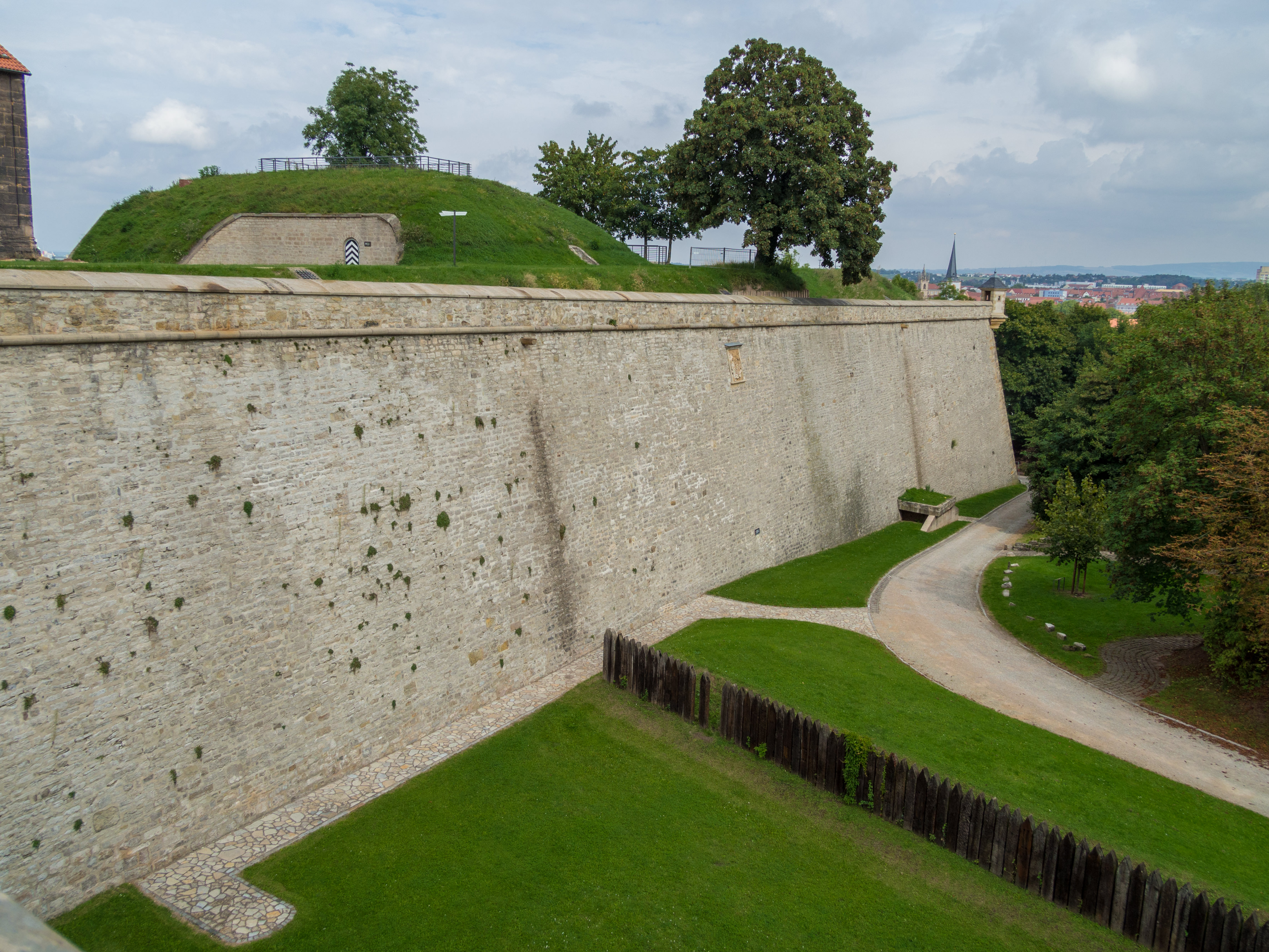
Stone walls, Petersberg Citadel

The citadel is surrounded by 2,180 metres of stone walls, which were erected in the first building phase, beginning in 1665. They form the star-shaped ground plan of the citadel, made with eight bastions and four ravelins and are between 1.2 and 6 metres thick, and from 8 to 26 metres high. There are small look-out towers built into the walls. There are now only three ravelins as Ravelin Wilhelm was removed in the 19th century.

There are tunnels within the walls, called the Horchgänge in German, meaning the 'listening passages'. At the time the citadel was first built there were no trenches or moats beyond the wall, so the Horchgänge were constructed so that soldiers could walk through them to listen for anyone trying to tunnel into the fortress.

=== Gate and Commandant Building (Peterstor & Kommandantenhaus) ===
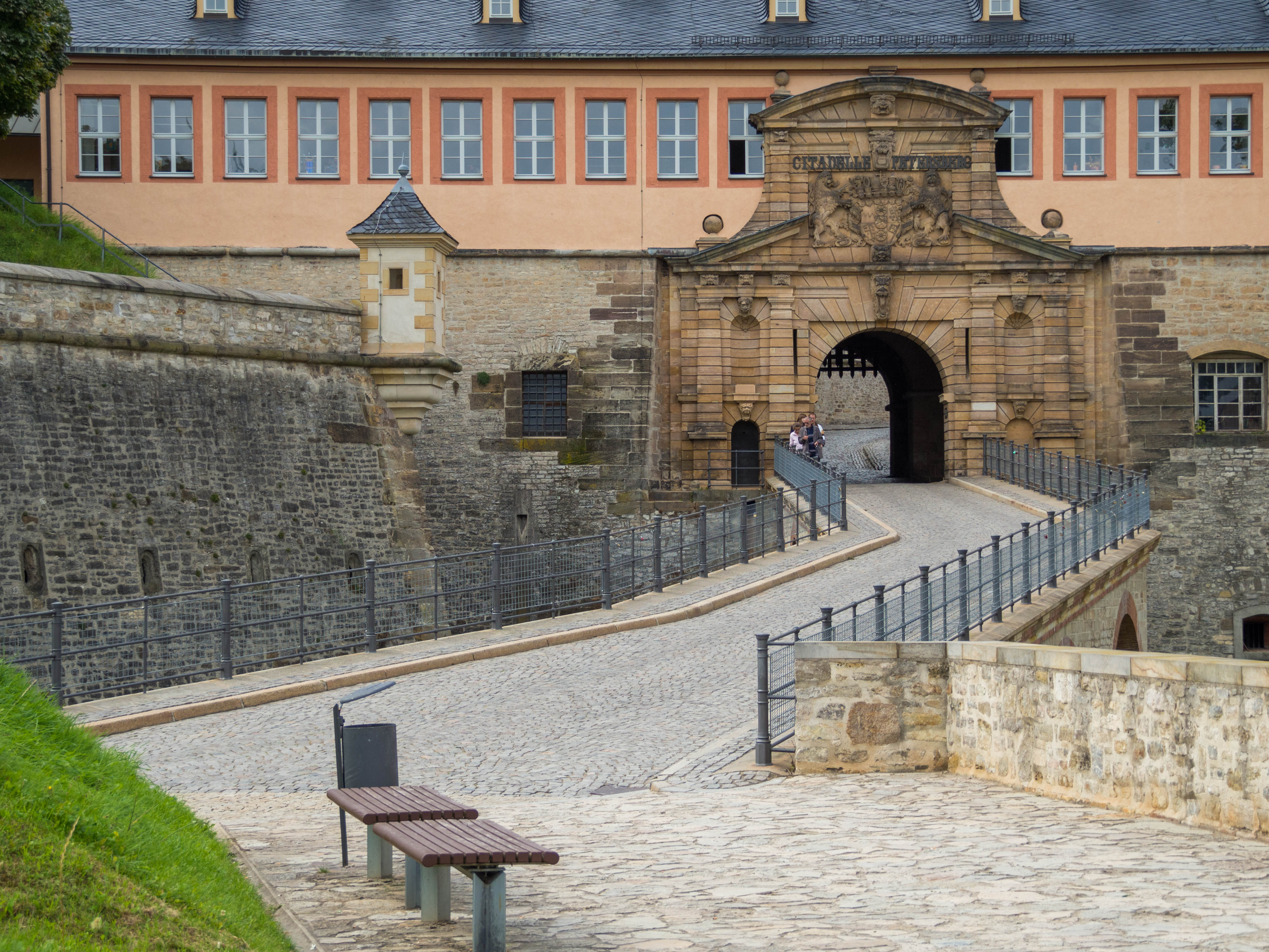
Main Gate and Commandant building, 2014

The Peterstor, the main entrance to the citadel, was built from 1666 to 1668. It was designed by Antonio Petrini and bears the coat of arms of Johann Philipp von Schönborn (1605–1673), the Archbishop-Elector of Mainz. In 1993 the two wooden portcullis were reconstructed within the double archway entrance. The script above the gateway which reads "Citadelle Petersberg", was installed in 1861.

The Commandant Building was built in 1669 by an Italian construction team. From 1939 to 1945 it was used as a military court by the Nazis. It was restored in 1998 and is now used by Tanztenne Petersberg, a dance school for traditional Thuringian folkdancing.

=== St Peter's Church (Peterskirche) ===
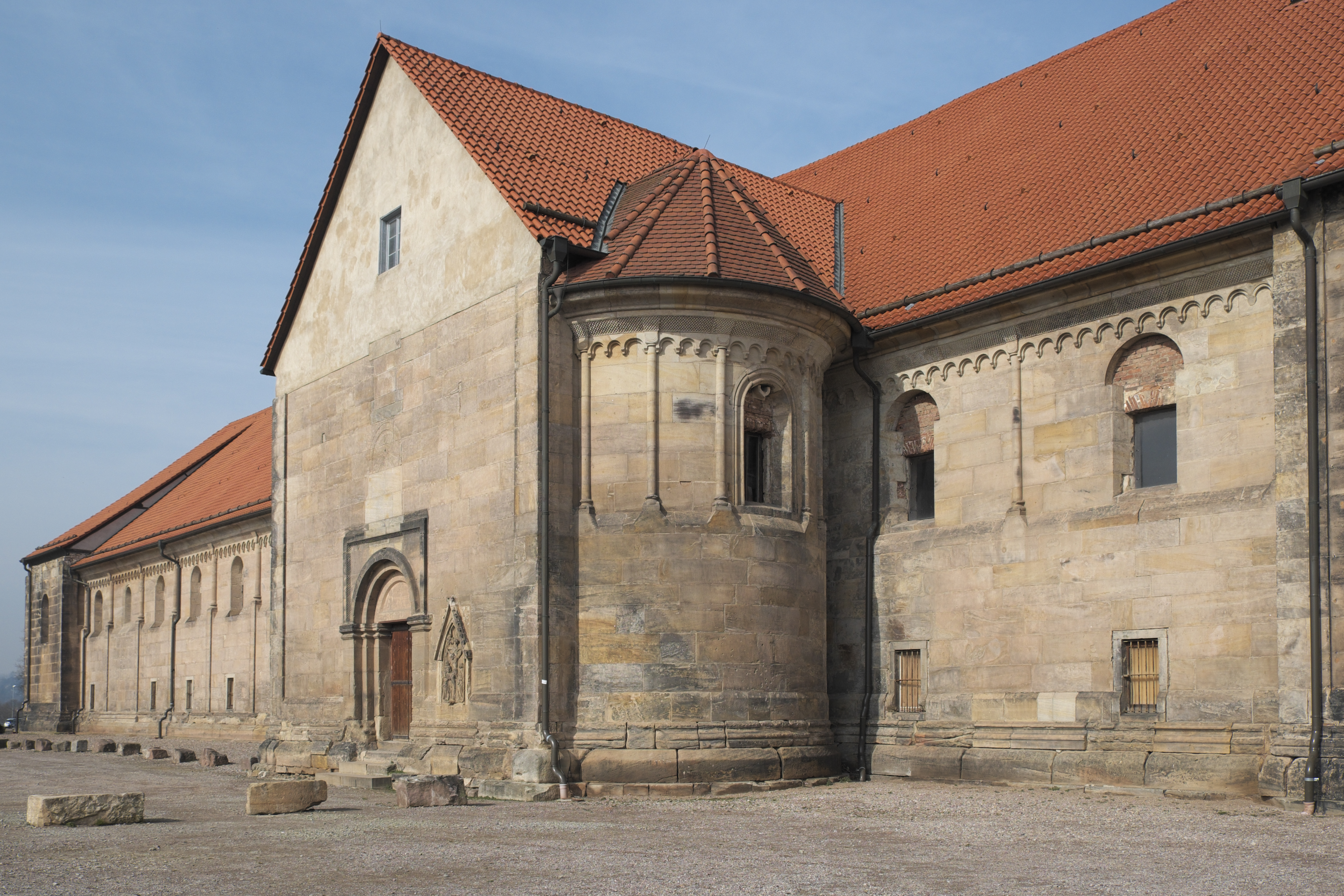
St Peter's Church built 1103–1147

The Peterskirche, the 75 metre-long monastery church, was built between 1103 and 1147. It originally had two towers at its east end, which along with the towers of the Erfurt cathedral and the Severikirche, dominated the city skyline. Until the end of the 13th century, emperors of the Holy Roman Empire and German kings often held court in the church. Church synods also took place there. In November 1181 an Imperial Diet was held in the church, presided over by Holy Roman Emperor Frederick I, known as Barbarossa. There Barbarossa's cousin Henry the Lion submitted to the emperor's authority after several years of opposition and war, and ceded most of his lands.

During the Thirty Years' War (1618–1648) Erfurt was occupied from 1631 by the troops of Gustav II Adolf of Sweden. In 1632, the Swedes briefly dissolved the monastery and temporarily converted it into a Protestant monastery in 1633. After the occupation only three monks remained. The church was damaged and the treasures and stores of the monastery were plundered. The damage to the church was repaired in the first and second building phases of citadel, in 1672 and 1727. In 1765 its interior was baroqueized by Italian plasterers.

In 1803 the monastery was secularised. On 6 November 1813 Prussian troops bombarded the French occupied citadel and much of it caught fire, including the church and monastery buildings. The monastery buildings, other than the church, were later then completely removed by Prussian forces who took possession of citadel in May 1814. From 1820 the remaining church was used as a store for flour and military provisions. The towers were dismantled, a new roof was built and three storage levels were constructed inside. In spite of these alterations, the building still has traces of medieval and baroque architectural details, sculpture and paintwork, and the monumental size of the building can still be appreciated.

Since 1993 the church has been used as an exhibition space for international concrete art, i.e. art which places a strong emphasis on geometrical abstraction. It has nothing to do with concrete, the building material.

=== Defense Barracks (Defensionkaserne) ===
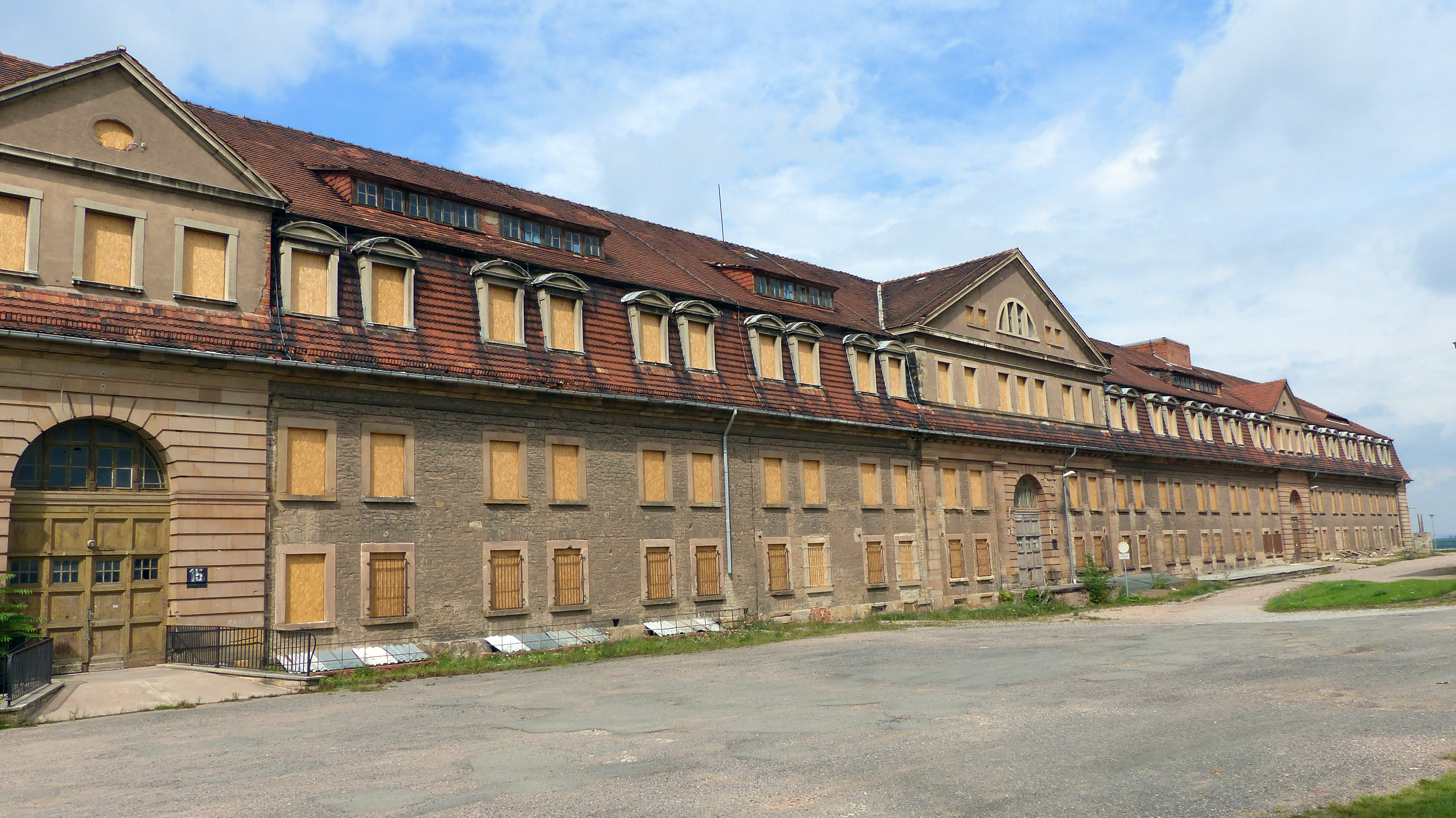
Defense Barracks, 2014

The Defense Barracks, by far the largest building on Petersberg Citadel, was built from 1828 to 1831 by the Prussian administration, on the site of the former monastery building which had been damage by fire in 1813 and later demolished.

The building is 167 metres long and 18.8 metres wide. The external walls are up to 2 metres thick. It could accommodate approximately 500 soldiers and was built primarily as an artillery position to hinder enemy access to the upper plateau of the citadel from the north. After the unification of Germany in 1871, the building was mainly used for housing soldiers and for storage. In 1912–1913 it was remodelled and expanded with a neo-Baroque style mansard roof and the addition of large dormer windows on both sides of the building. After this it was then able to accommodate 750 soldiers.

After the end of World War I in 1918, as a result of the Treaty of Versailles in 1919, there was gradual decline in use of military facilities in Germany. The barracks was used as residential building and as quarters for the civil police and the Freikorps Thüringen, a civilian militia army unit.

During the rearmament of the army during the Nazi period, there was renewed military use of Petersberg citadel. From 1936 to 1938 part of the barracks was used to house the new established Motorized Infantry Regiment no. 71, and from 1938 to 1939 as the headquarters of the army's administrative offices. In 1944 a transit camp for displaced people was established in the Defense Barracks, and this was continued by the occupying Soviet administration after the war.

When the German Democratic Republic (East Germany) was founded in 1949, the citadel again was used by the military. The Defense Barracks was used to accommodate a police school, the Kasernierte Volkspolizei (a precursor to the Nationale Volksarmee – NVA), and after 1956 newly formed NVA. After 1963 the citadel became the property of the city of Erfurt and the Defense Barracks were used for storage. It has been vacant since 2000 and there is on going discussion about how it will ultimately be restored and used.

=== Barracks A (Kaserne A) ===
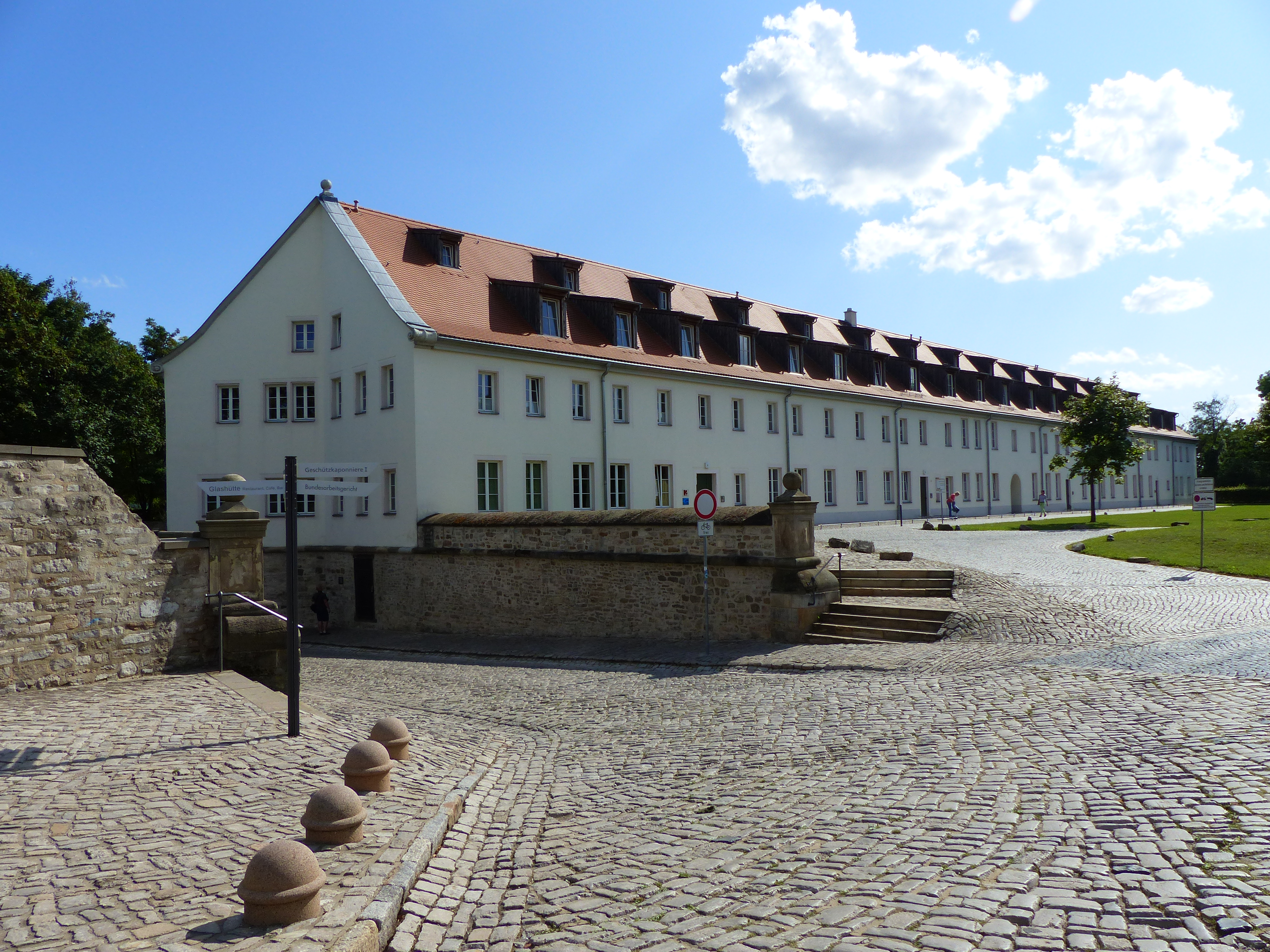
Barracks A, 2014

Barracks A was built in 1675. The 94-meter-long building is a terrace of four houses with separate entrances and a central portal providing access to a back courtyard. It was used as a barracks until the end of World War I in 1918. After that it was used for civilian housing. From 1935 to 1945 it housed the Wehrbezirkskommando (District military command headquarters). From 1945 it was an old people's home. The building was restored between 2000 and 2001, and it now houses a mixture of private apartments and offices.

=== Lower Barracks (Untere Kaserne) ===
The Lower Barracks was built c.1690. It now houses the Stasi Records Agency, officially the Bundesbeauftragt für die Stasi-Unterlagen (BStU). It provides exhibitions and public guided tours, in German, every third Thursday of the month. The BStU has 15 such regional archives in Germany.

=== Artillery Barracks (Artilleriekaserne) ===
The Artillery Barracks was built between 1679 and 1681. Side wings were added to the building in 1825. It was in military use until 1964, when it housed the military headquarters. It was restored 1990–1993. Administrative offices of the Thuringian department for monument protection and archaeology (Thüringische Landesamt für Denkmalpflege und Archäologie, TLDA) are now housed in the building.

=== Maintenance Sergeant's quarters (Schirrmeisterei) ===
The Maintenance Sergeant's quarters was built in 1530 as part of the Monastery of St Peter and Paul. From 1665, when the military took over the site, it was used as the Marketenderei, in English the 'sutler's building'. The sutler was a merchant who accompanied an army in order to sell provisions to soldiers. After 1820 it became a farm yard for the Prussian garrison.

=== St. Leonard's Church (Leonhardskirche) ===
It is not known exactly when the Leonhardskirche was built, but the first mention of it was in 1185. It was originally in the romanesque style, but after the site became a fortress the windows were altered and the building became an artillery store. It was destroyed in a World War II air raid. In the early 1990s the foundations were excavated and can be seen today.

== Gallery ==
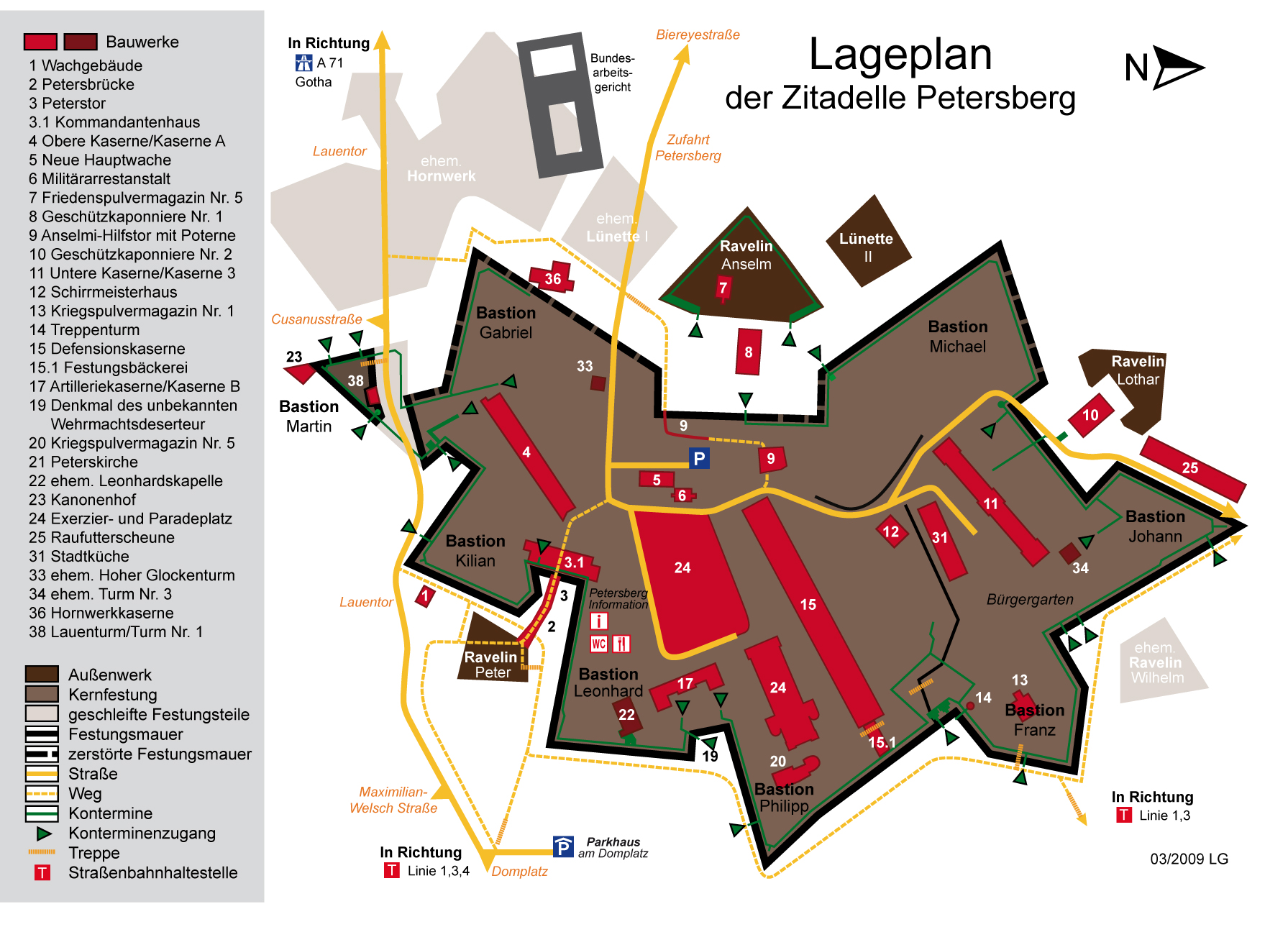
Groundplan of Petersberg Citadel, 2009

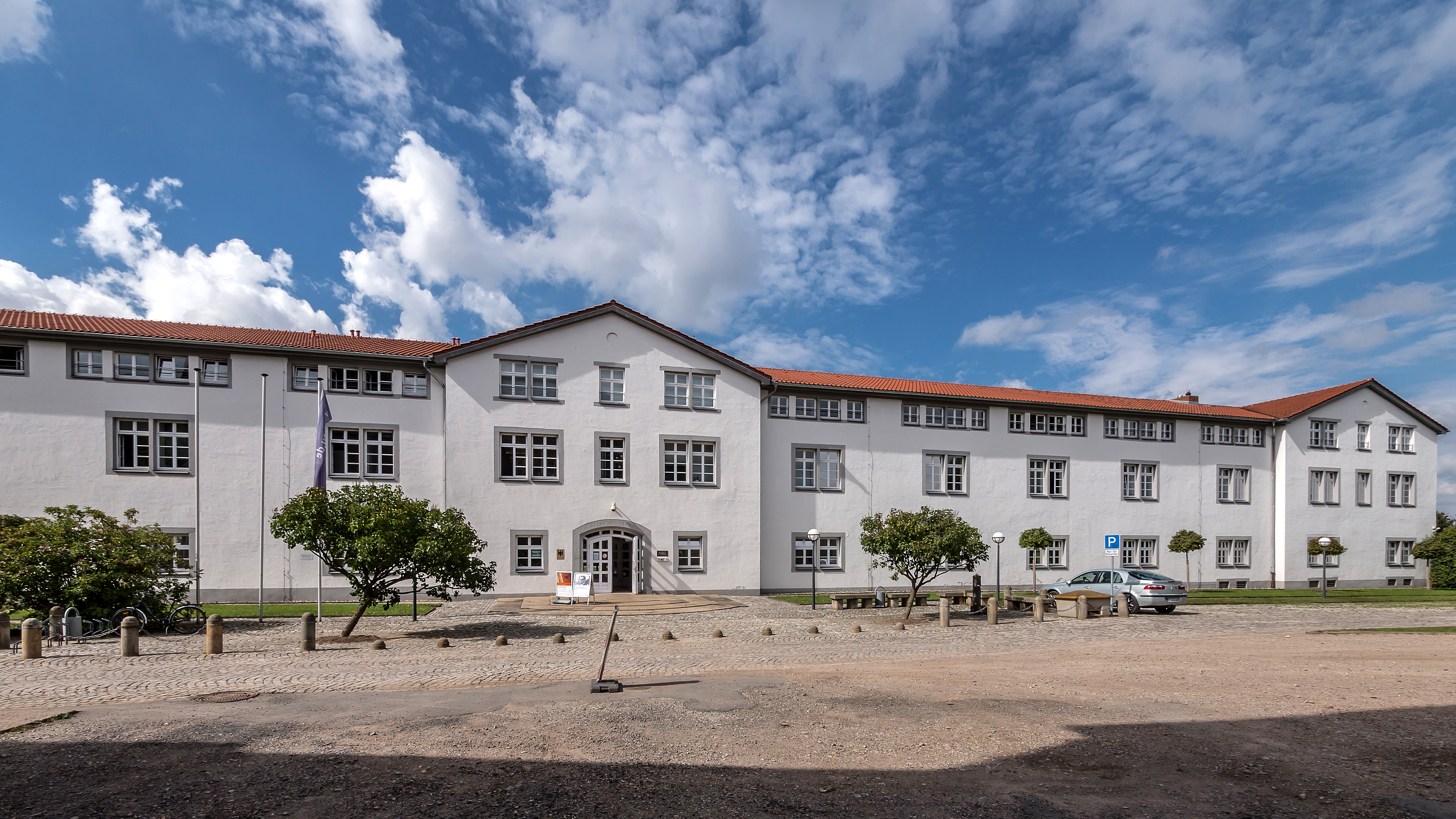
Former Lower Barracks, now the Stasi Archive, built c.1690

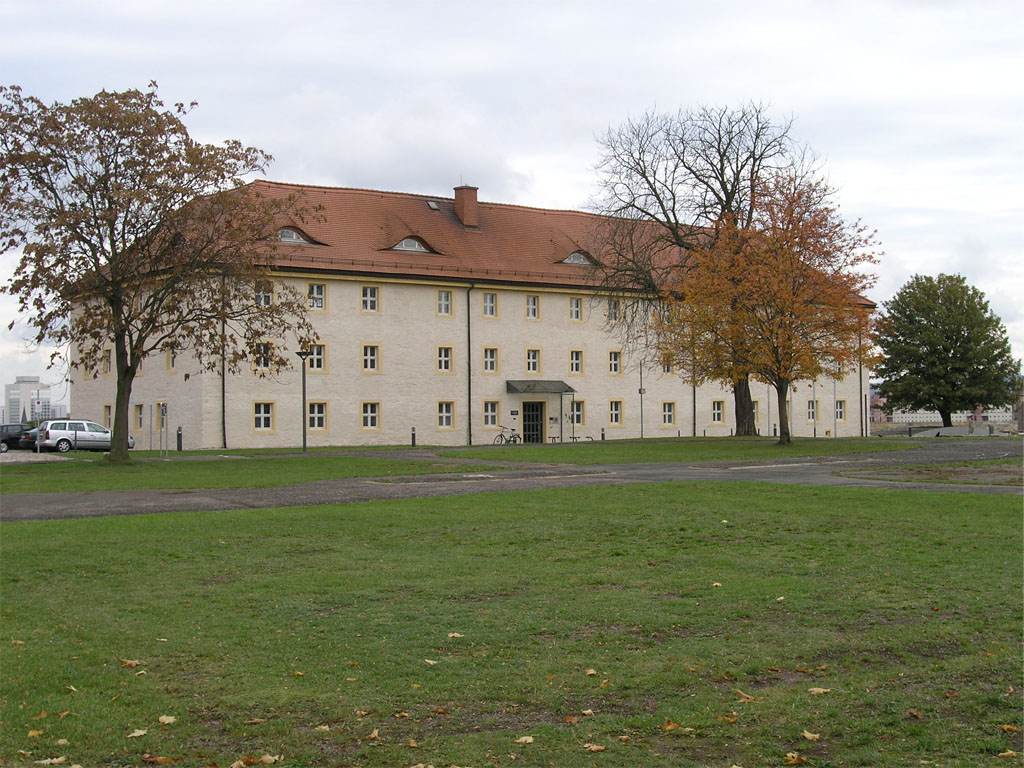
Artillery Barracks, built 1679–1681

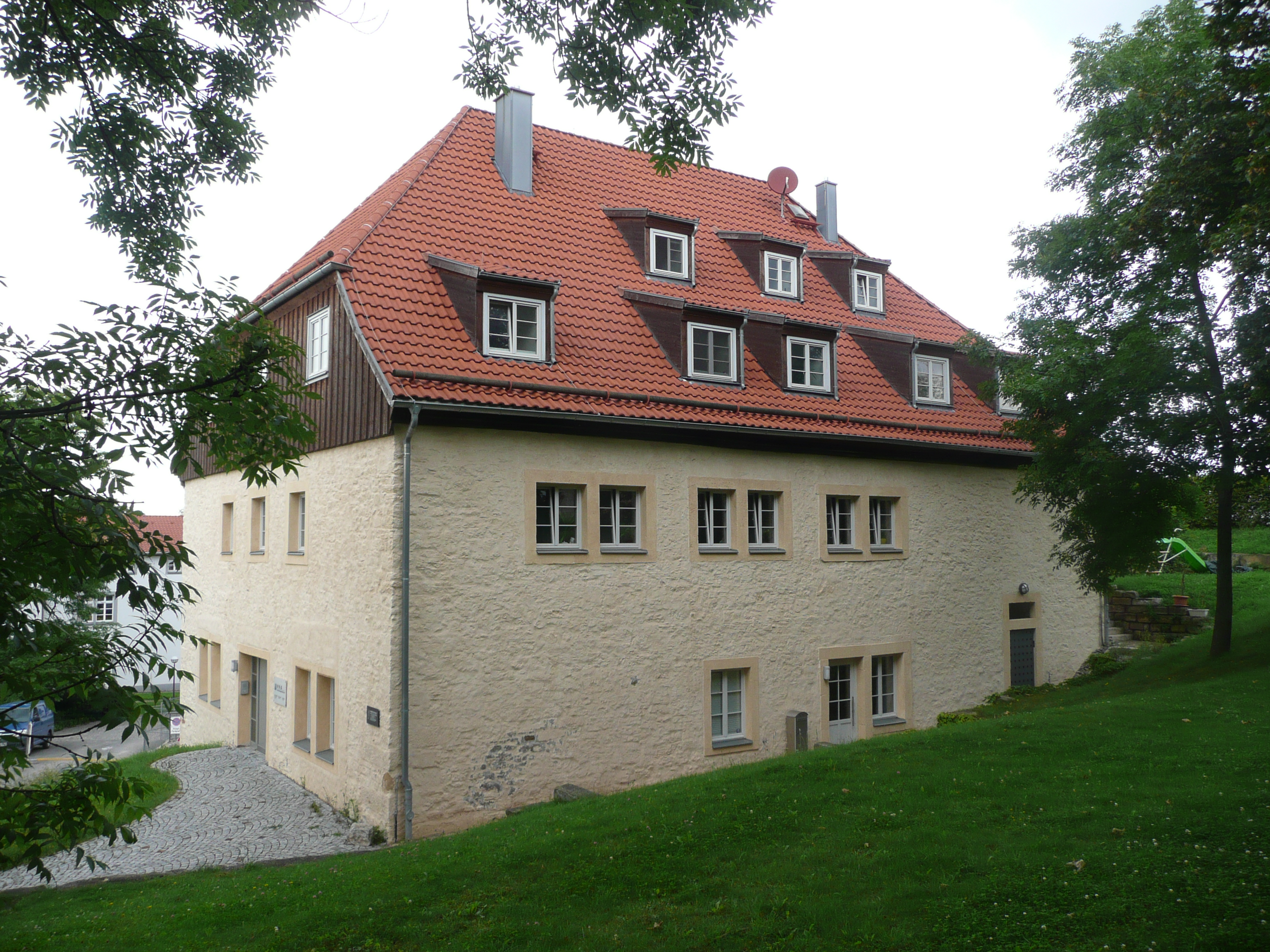
Maintenance Sergeant's quarters, built 1530

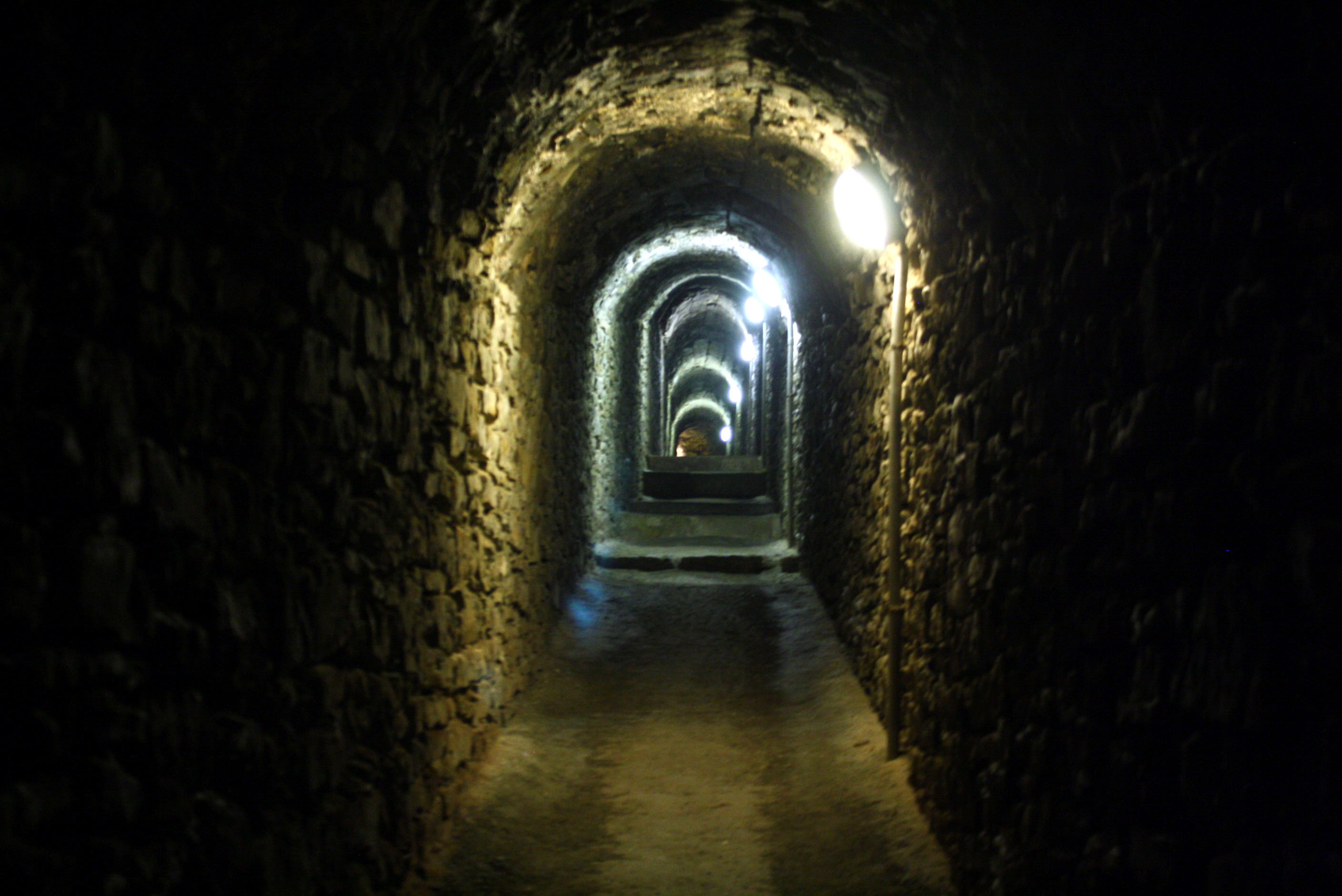
Tunnels, Petersberg Citadel

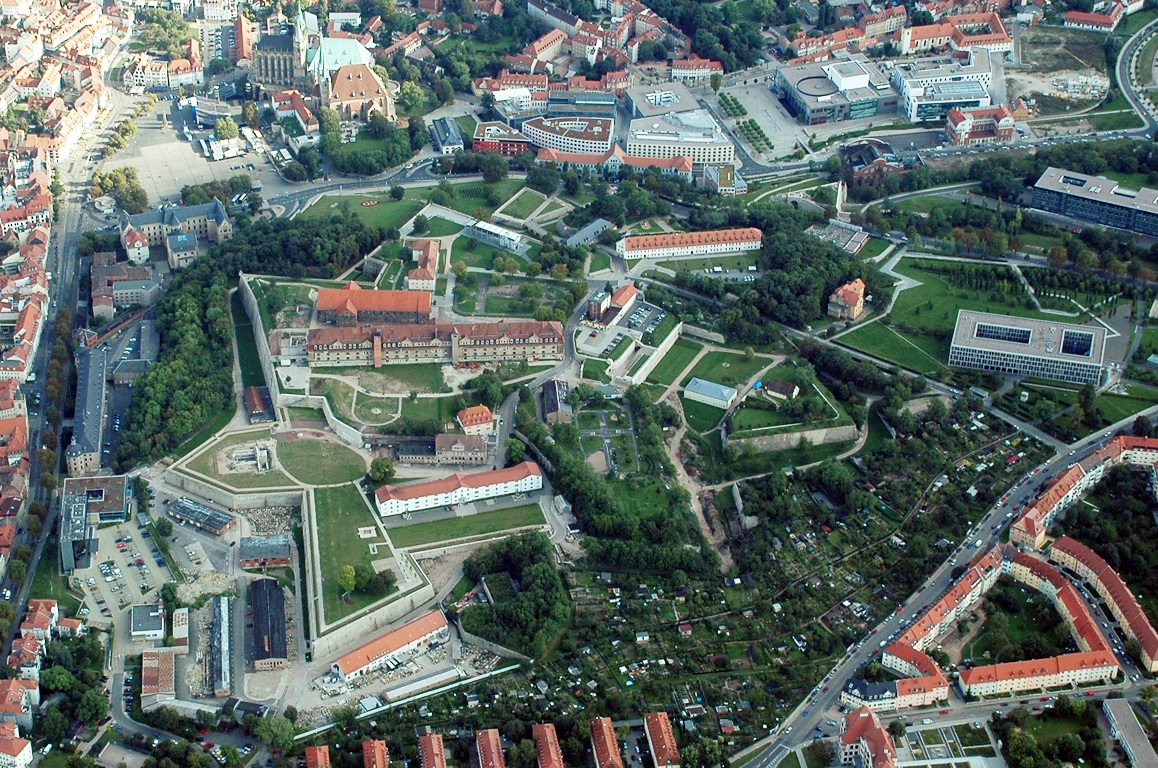
Aerial view of Petersberg Citadel, 2007

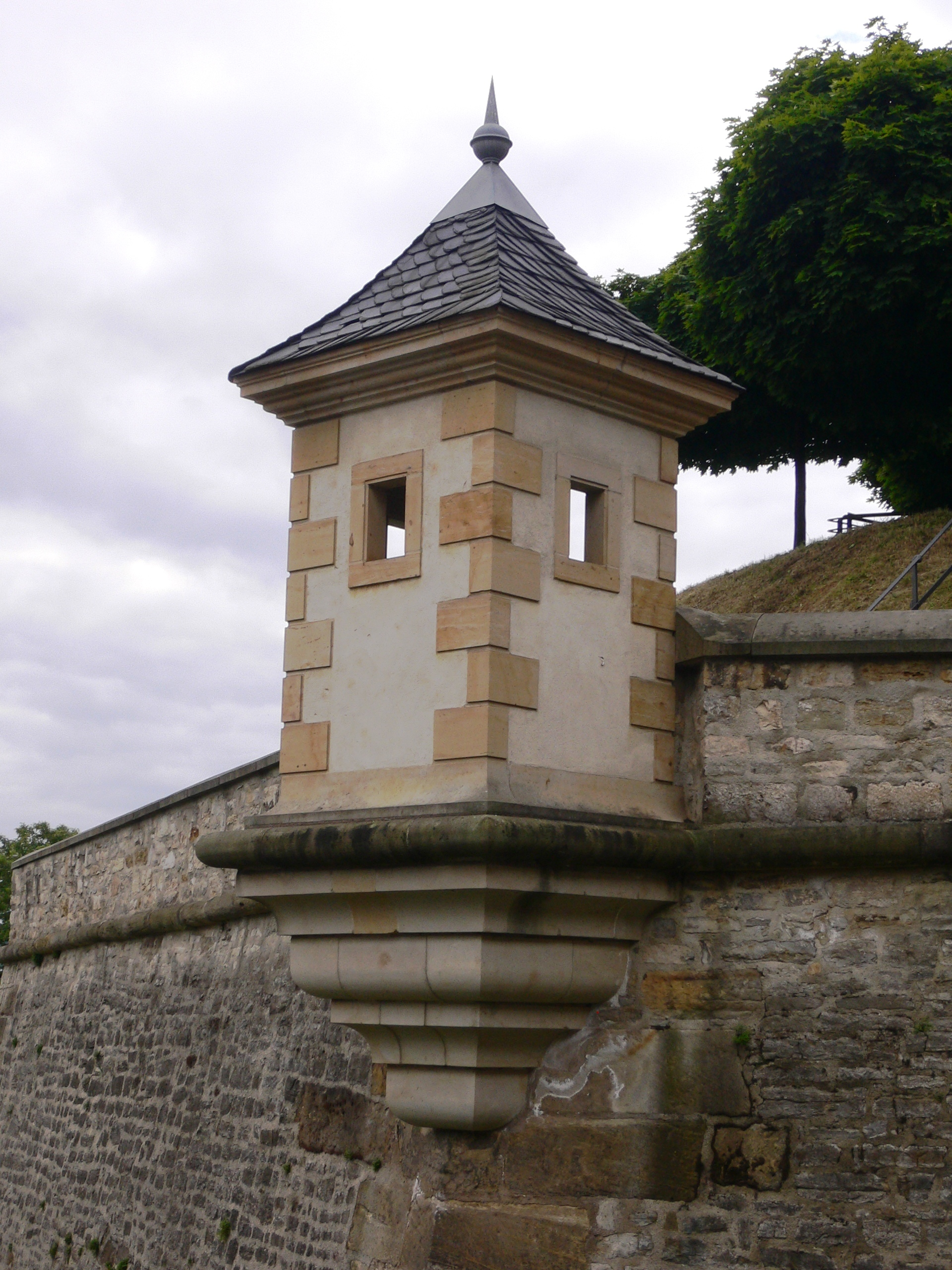
Lookout point, Petersberg Citadel

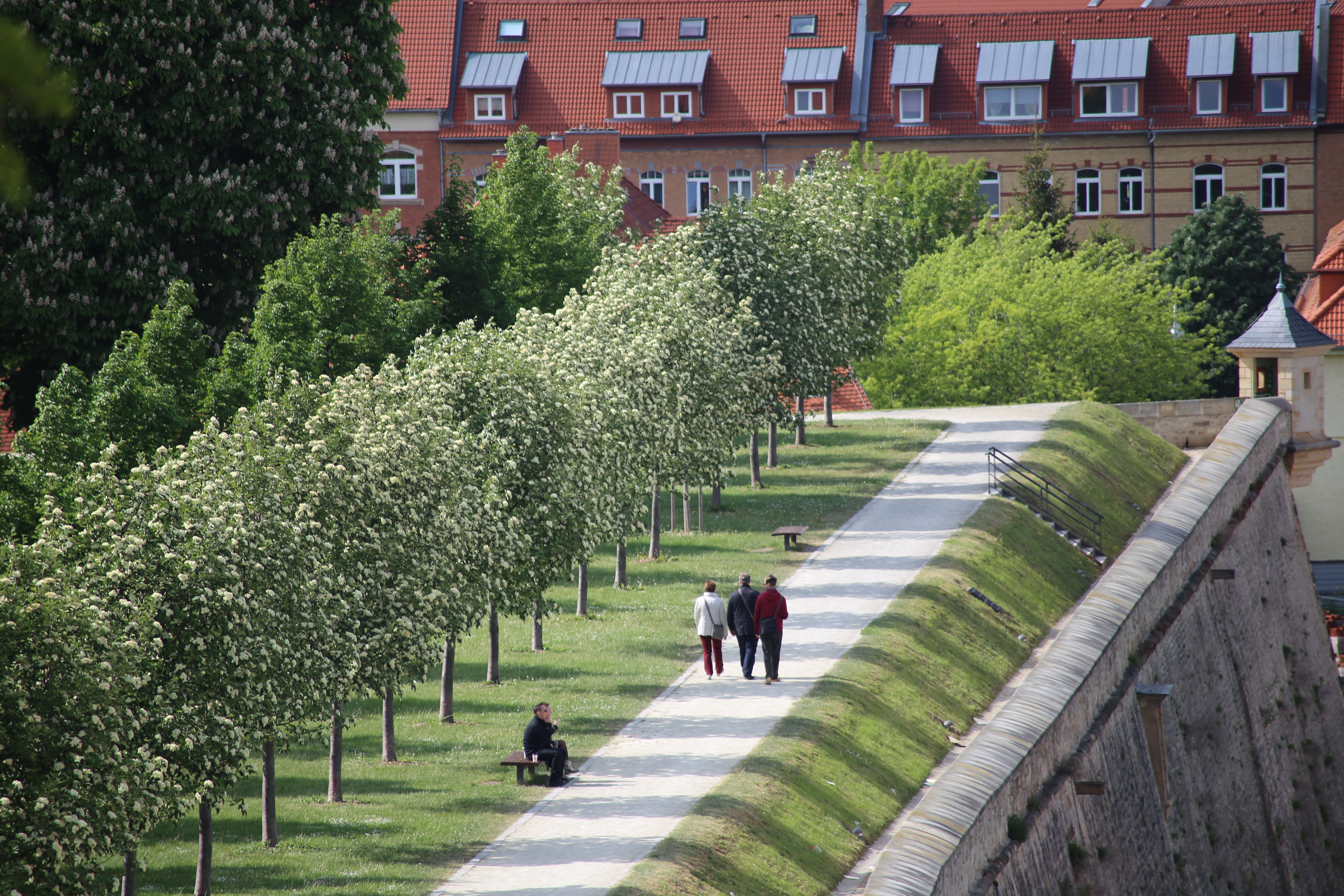
Wall walk, Petersberg Citadel, May 2015

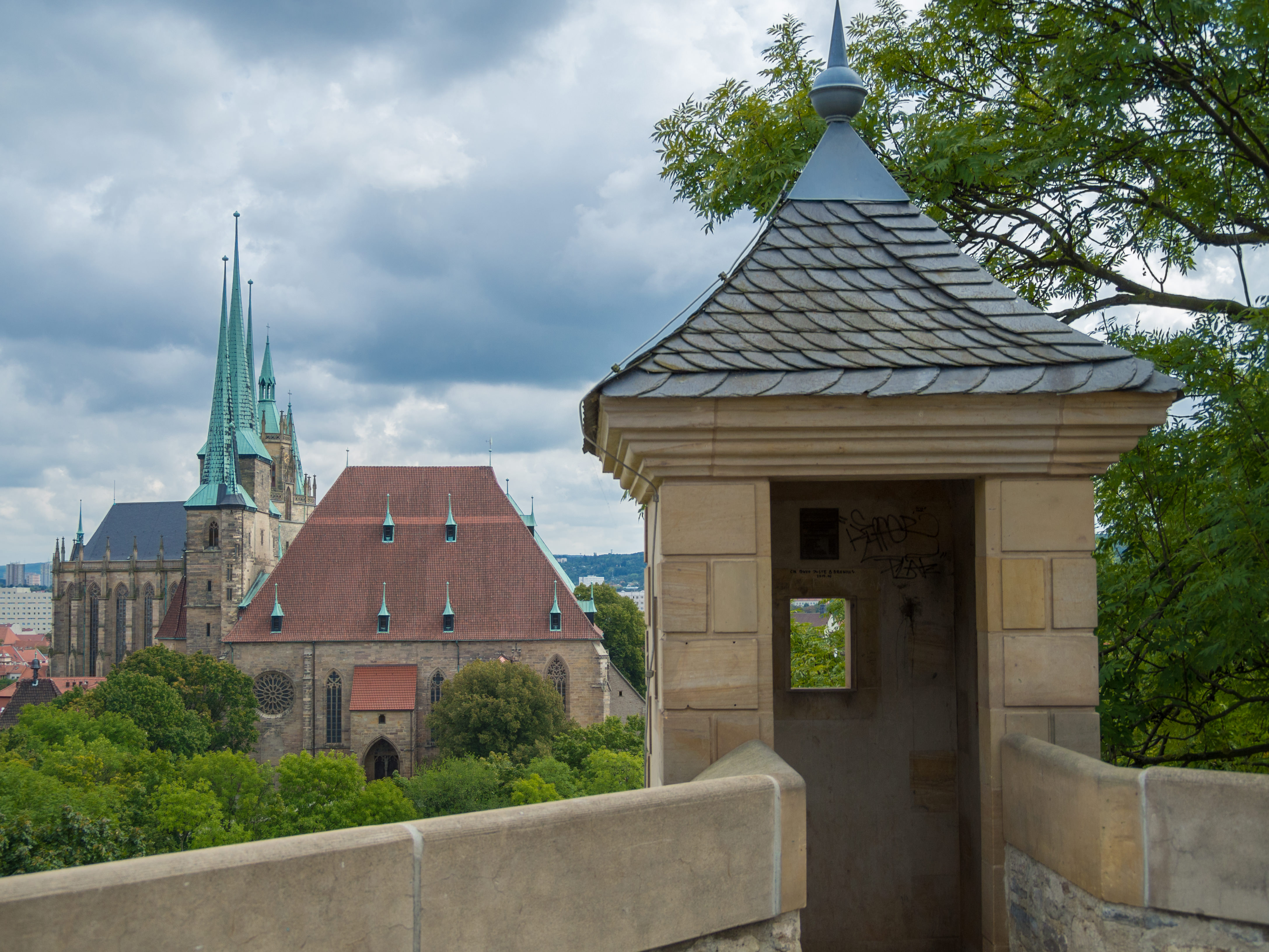
View of Erfurt Cathedral and Severikirche from Petersberg Citadel

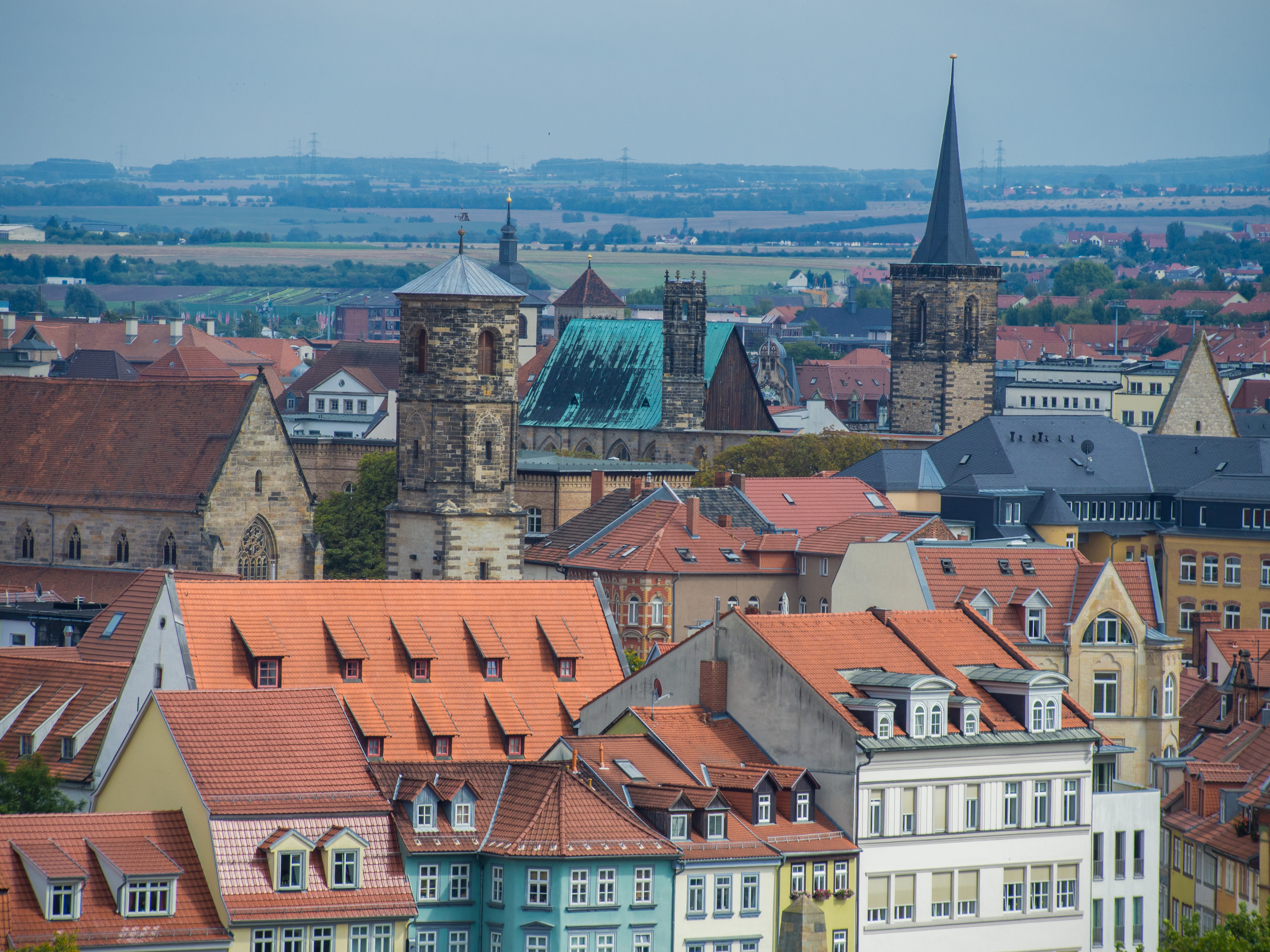
View of Erfurt old town from Petersberg Citadel, 2014

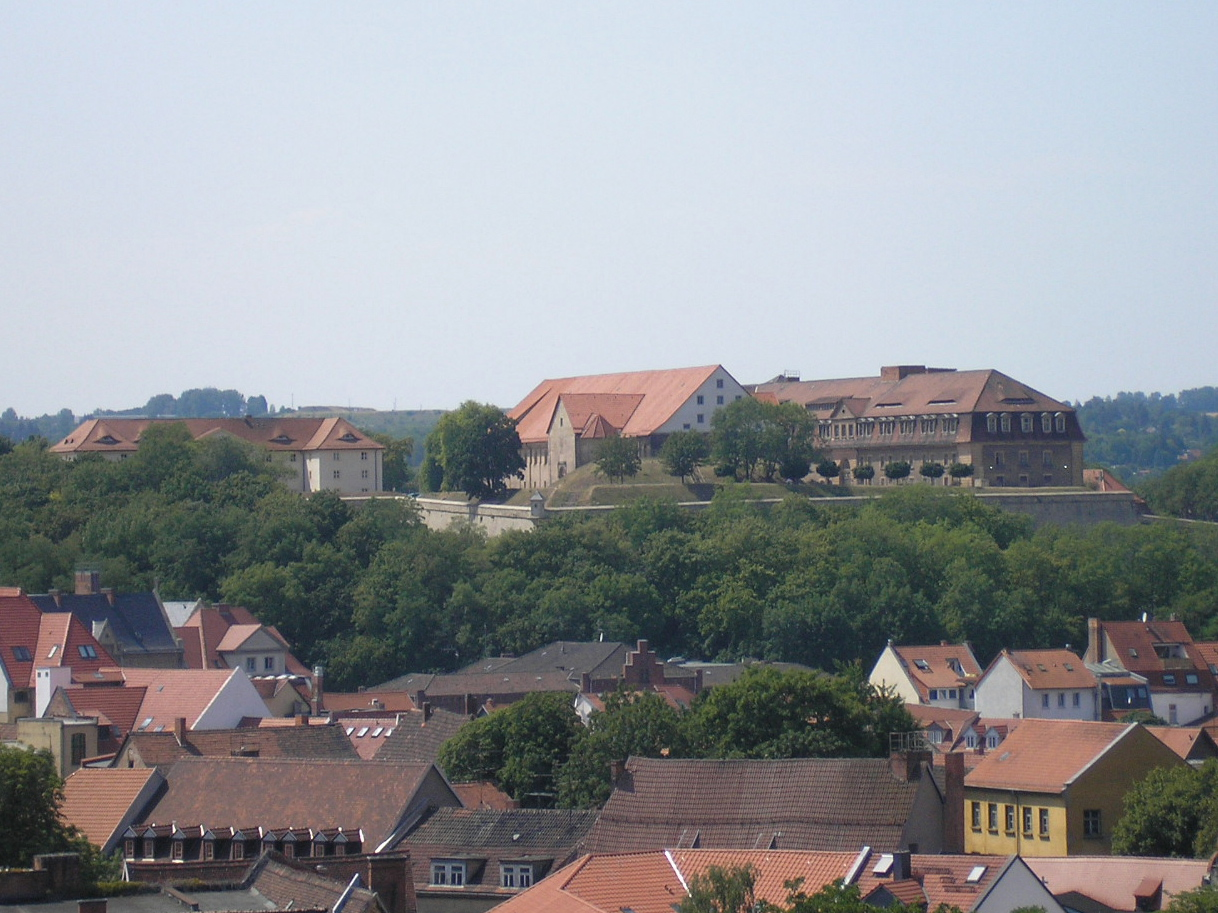
St Peter's Church and Defense Barracks

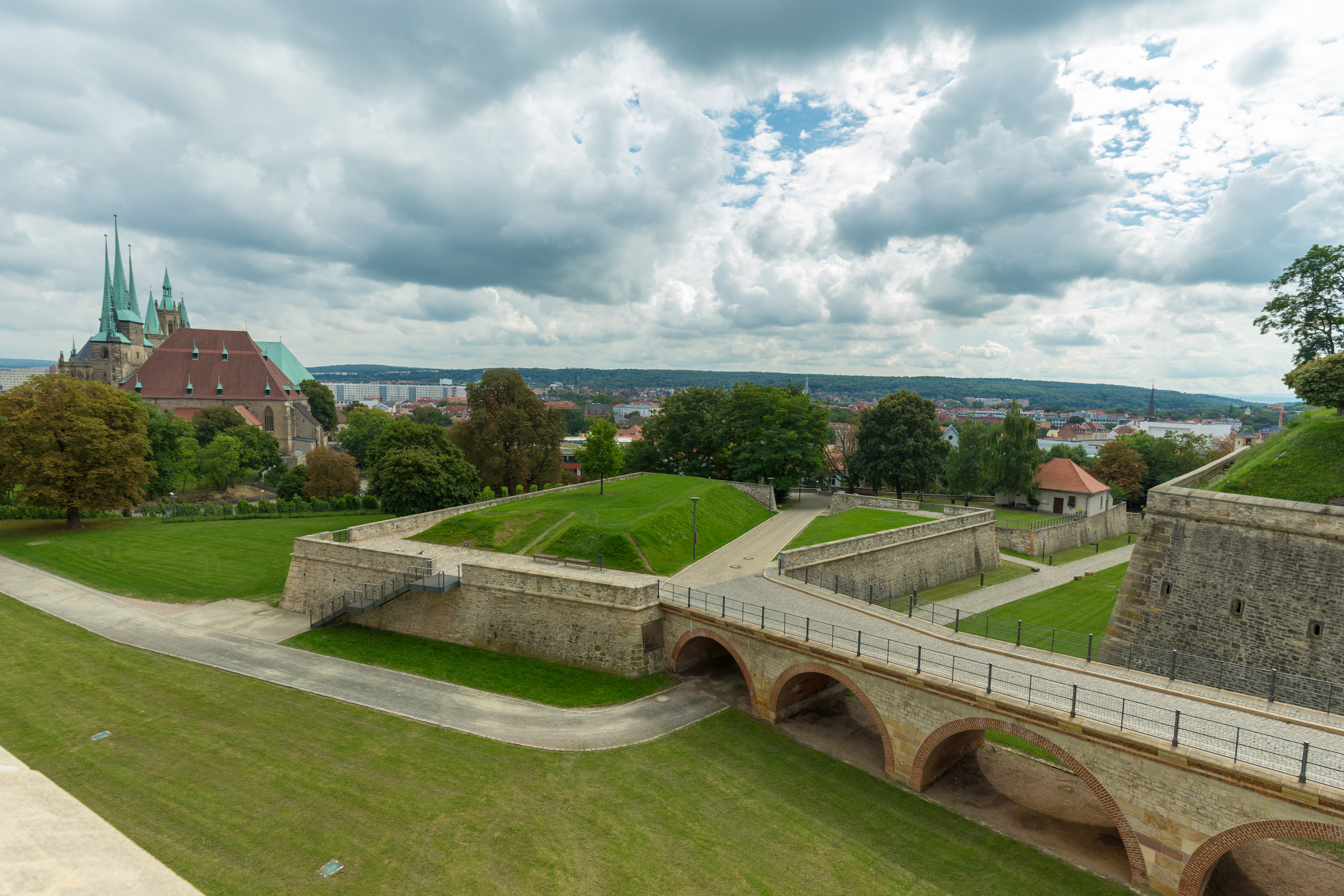
Ravelin Peter, built 1708, and access bridge, Petersberg Citadel, 2014

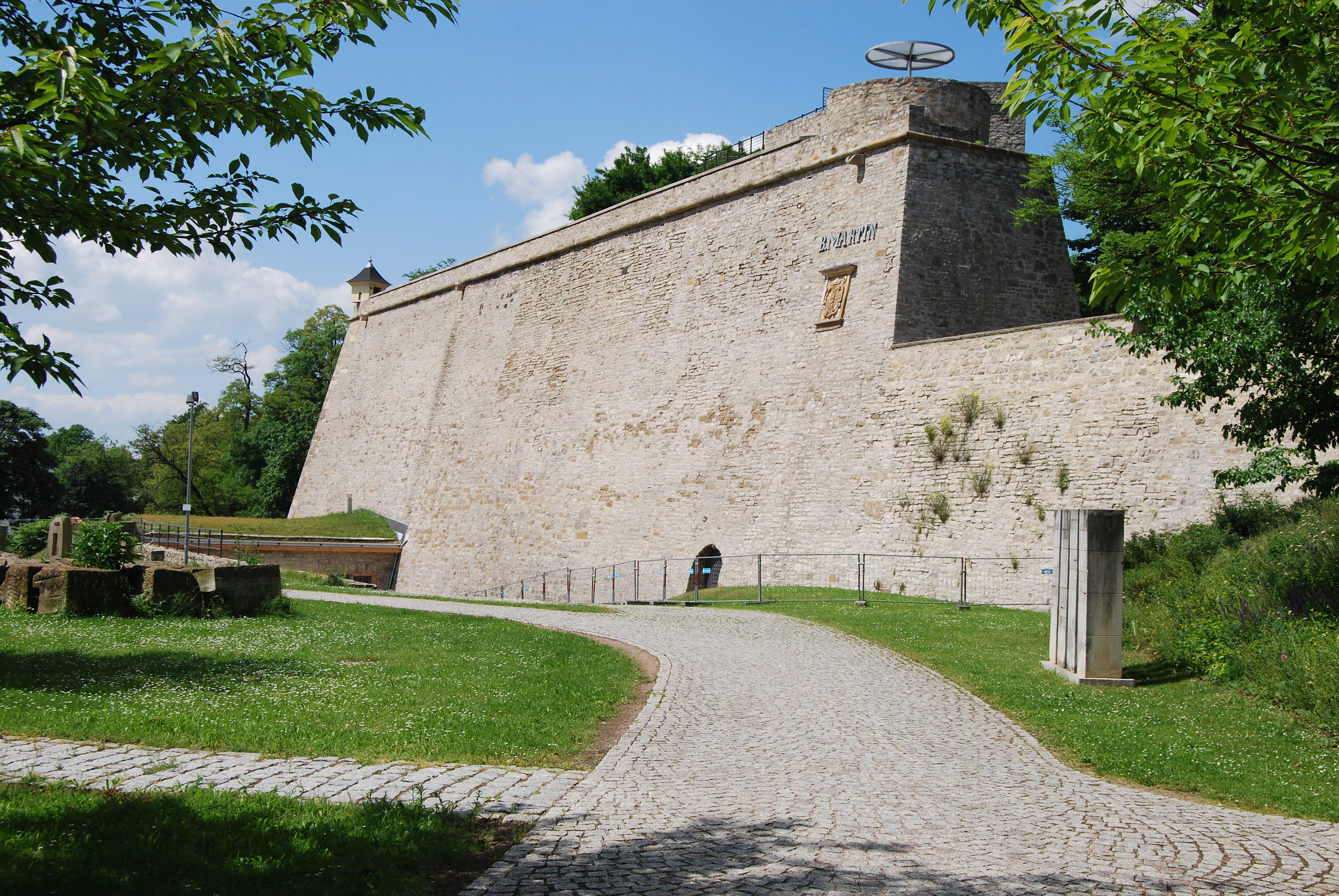
Bastion Martin, Petersberg Citadel, built 1667–68,

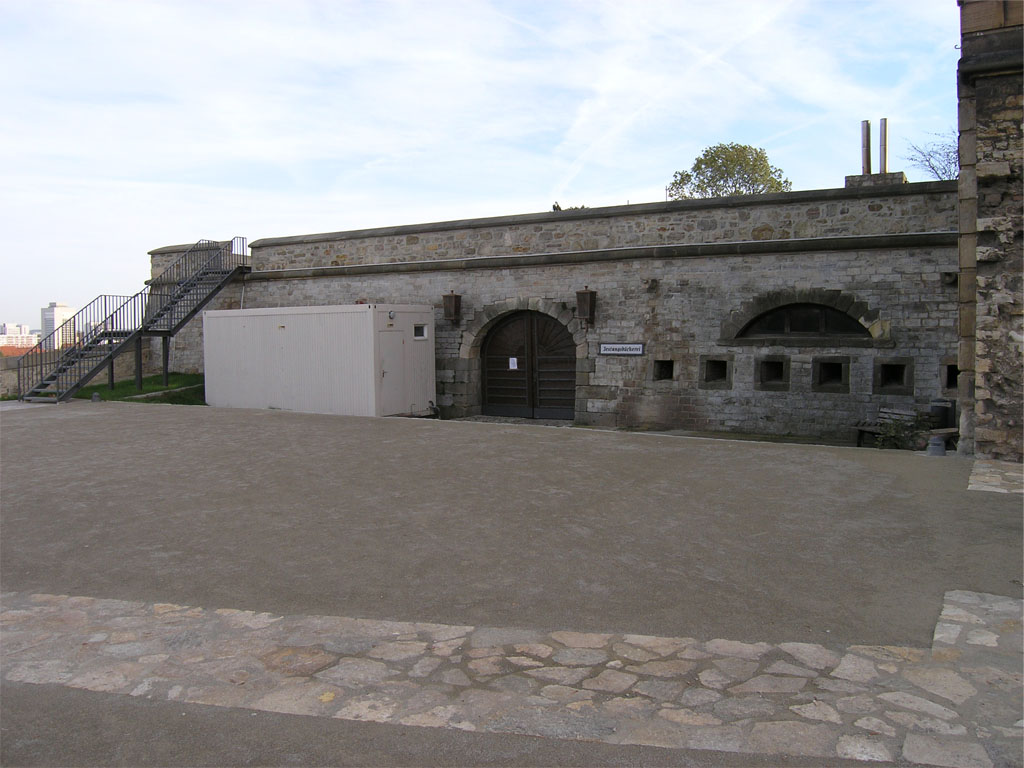
Fortress bakery, Petersberg Citadel, built 1832

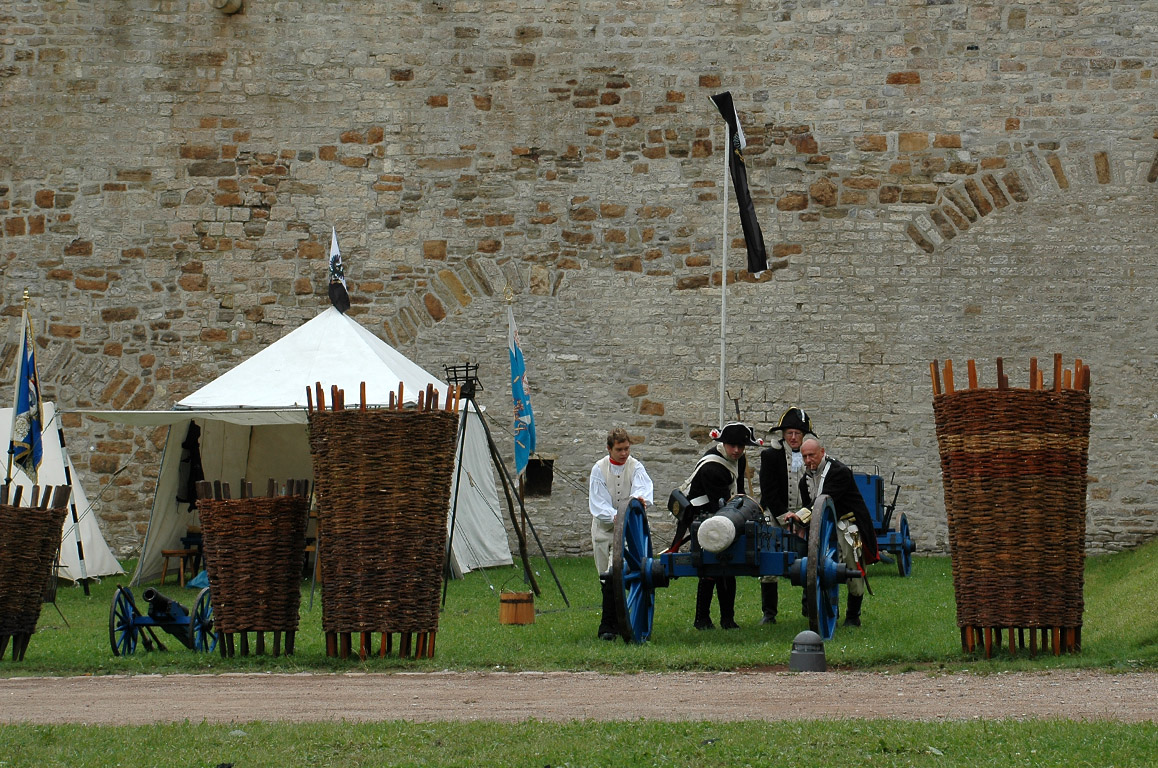
Reenactment of Prussian soldiers using cannon at Petersberg Citadel, 2007

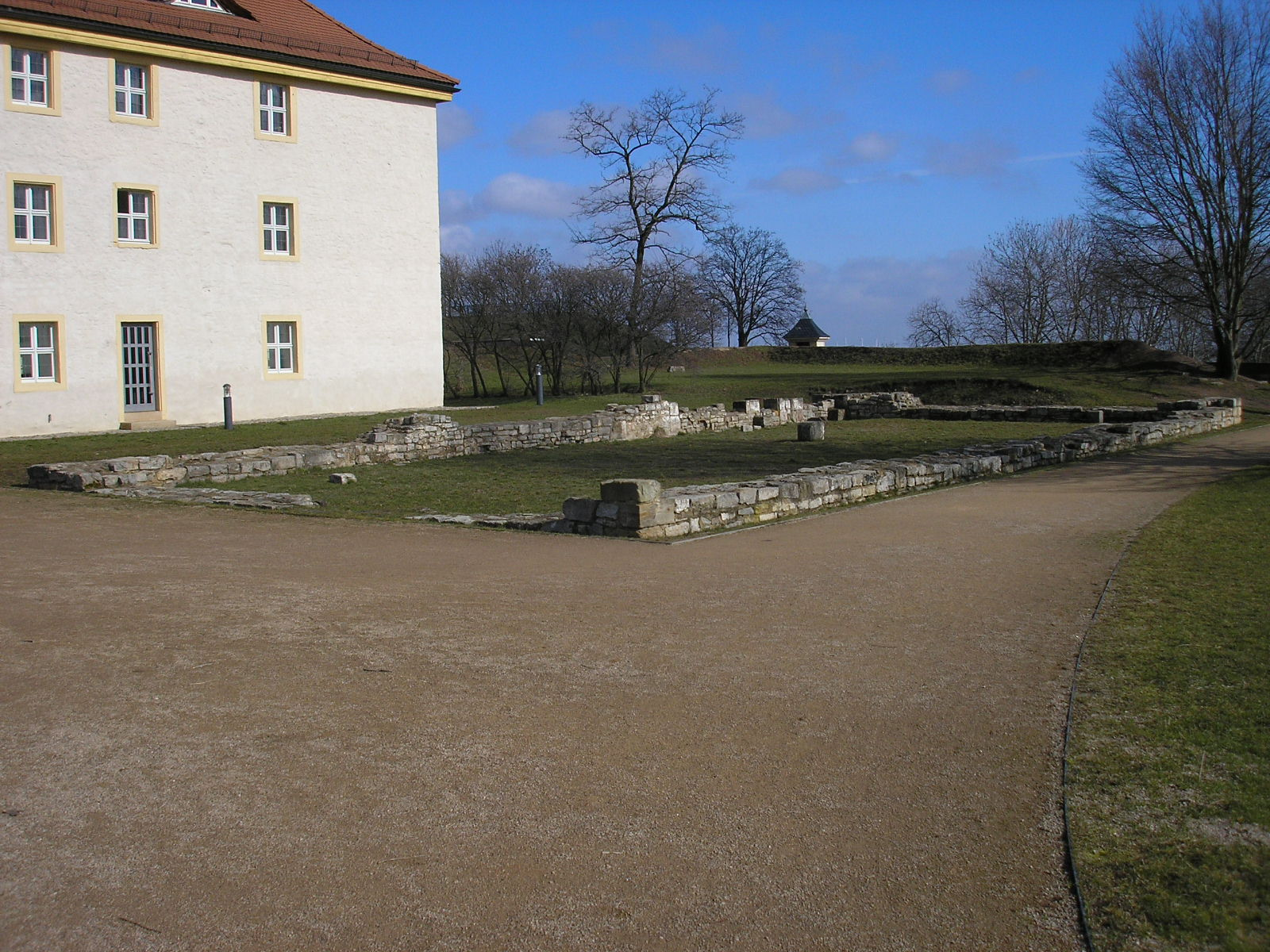
Foundations of the Leonhardskirche

== See also ==
- Bastion fort
- Capitulation of Erfurt
- Citadel
- Principality of Erfurt
