= Congress of Erfurt =

1808 meeting to reinstate France and Russia's alliance

Congress of Erfurt Fürstenkongress Erfurt (German)
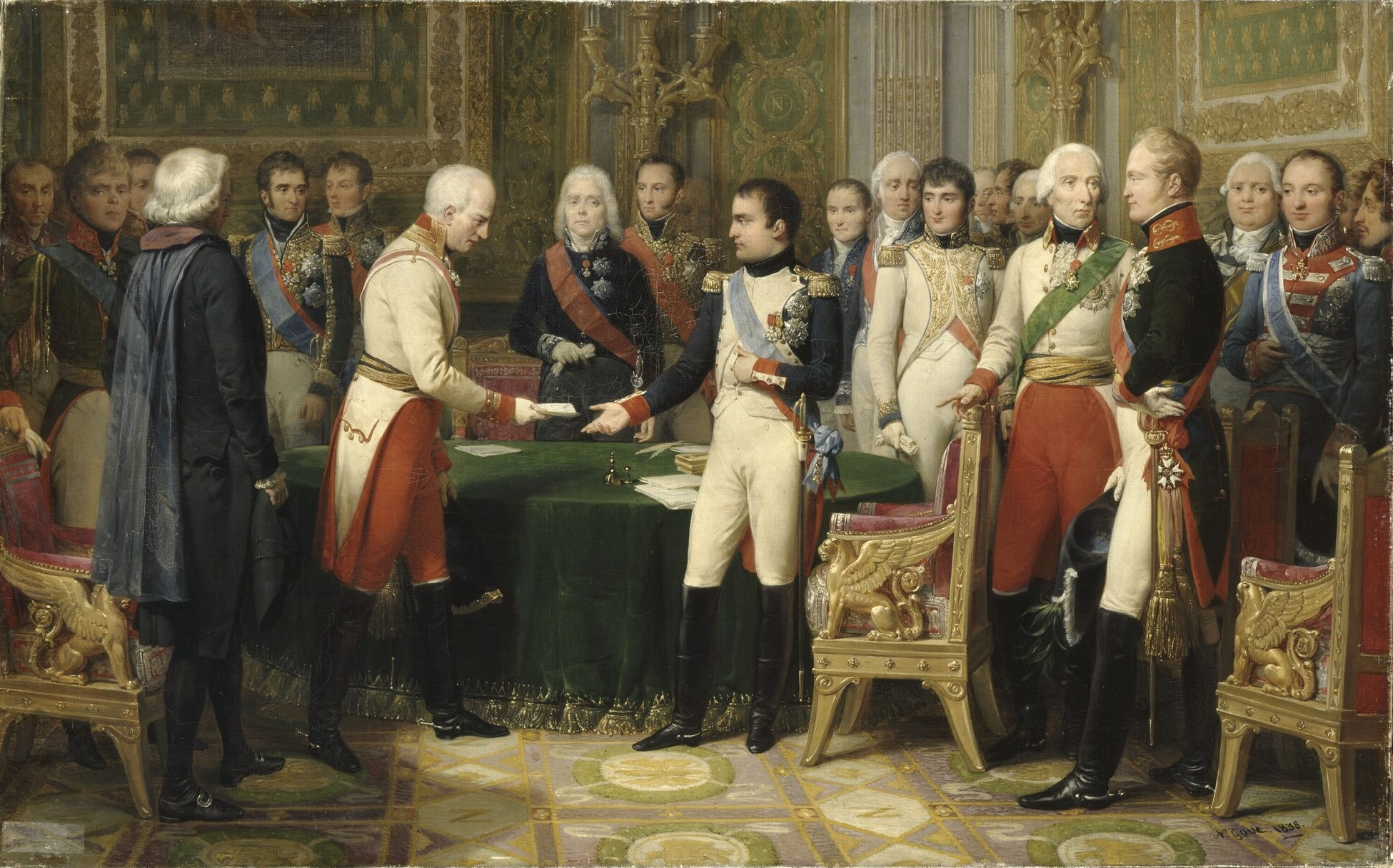
- The Congress of Erfurt, oil on canvas by Nicolas Gosse
- Host country: First French Empire
- Date: 27 September – 14 October 1808
- Venue(s): Kurmainzische Statthalterei, Principality of Erfurt
- Participants: (First French Empire) Napoleon, Emperor of the French; (Russian Empire) Alexander I, Emperor of All Russia
- Follows: Treaties of Tilsit

The Congress of Erfurt was the meeting between Napoleon, Emperor of the French, and Alexander I, Emperor of All Russia, from Tuesday 27 September to Friday 14 October 1808 intended to reaffirm the alliance concluded the previous year with the Treaties of Tilsit which followed the end of the War of the Fourth Coalition.

== Background ==
At Tilsit, Napoleon had made an admirer of Alexander, but by the time of the meeting at Erfurt anti-French sentiment at the Russian court was beginning to threaten the newly forged alliance. Napoleon and his foreign minister Jean-Baptiste Nompère de Champagny sought to strengthen the alliance once more in order to settle affairs in Spain and prepare for the expected war with Austria. Working at cross-purposes to Napoleon was Charles Maurice de Talleyrand-Périgord who had by this time come to the conclusion that Napoleon was leading France to destruction, and who secretly advised Alexander to resist Napoleon's demands.

== Conference ==
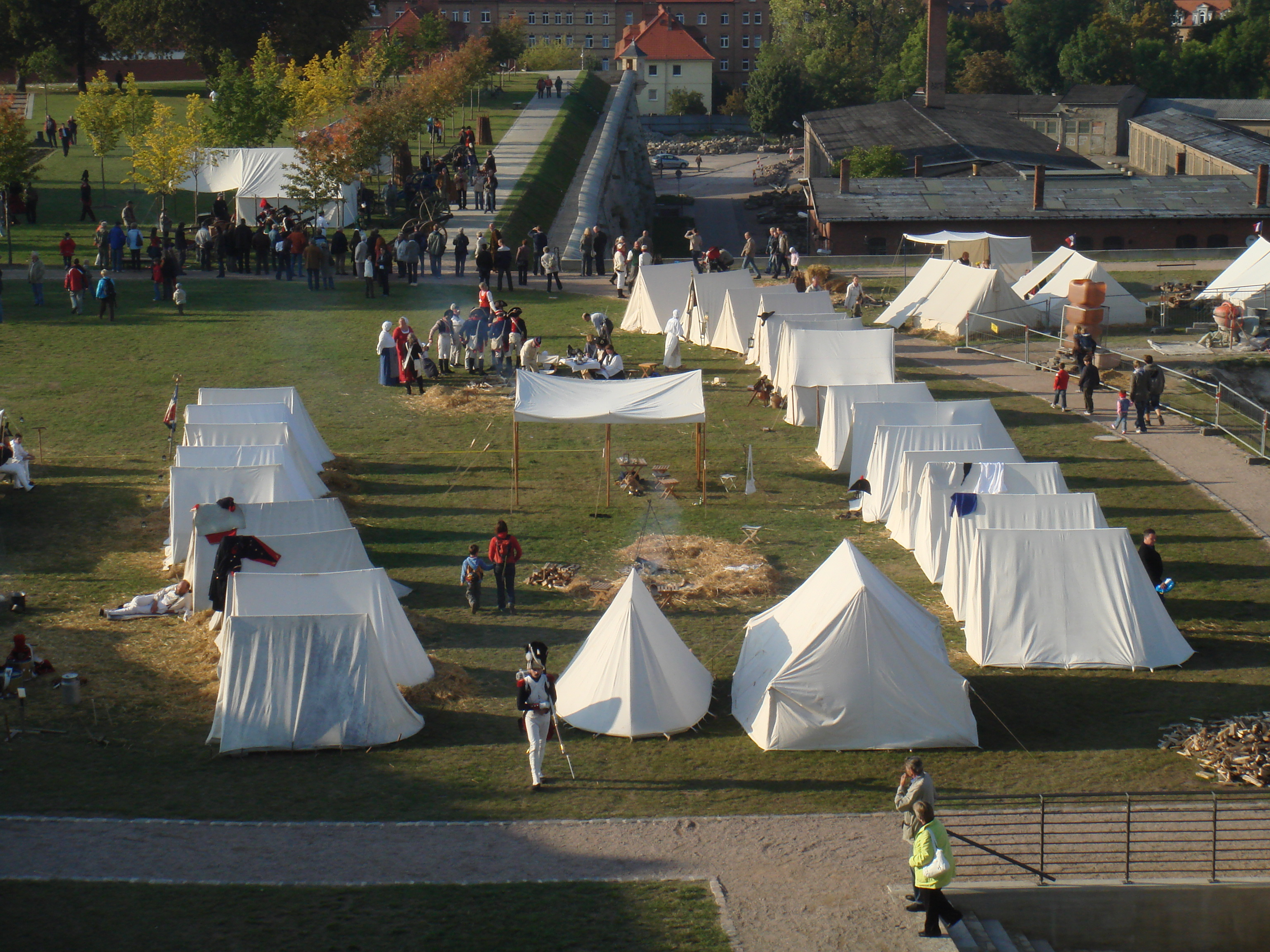
Reenactment of military camp at Petersberg Citadel, 200th anniversary of Congress of Erfurt, September 2008.

The city of Erfurt was under the direct control of the Emperor of the French at this time as the Principality of Erfurt. Napoleon attempted to awe Alexander with the glories of the French Empire. The meeting became a great conference involving an array of kings, princes, dukes, barons and notables from all over Europe. Among the attendees was Talma and the entire Comédie-Française, who presented sixteen French tragedies over the course of the Congress. Goethe was courted by Napoleon himself and the twenty-year-old Arthur Schopenhauer arrived in Goethe's train and cast a cynical eye over the proceedings.

Out of the meetings came an agreement, the Erfurt Convention, in fourteen articles, calling upon Britain to cease its war against France, recognizing the Russian conquest of Finland from Sweden, and stating that in case of war with Austria, Russia should aid France "to the best of its ability." The two emperors departed for their homelands on 14 October. Six months later the expected war with Austria began, and Alexander barely lived up to his agreement, aiding France as little as possible. By 1810 both emperors were considering war with one another. Erfurt was the last meeting between the two leaders.

By 1812 Russia no longer complied with Napoleon's Continental System of economic warfare against the United Kingdom and anti-French sentiment in the Russian court had reached a new height. Russian defence spending had increased and troops were deployed to the border in preparation for an invasion of Poland. Napoleon pre-empted this by attacking first and with greater force.

From the beginning at Tilsit few onlookers believed these two European powers could peacefully exist side by side, with the Grand Duchy of Warsaw a French satellite state neighbouring Russia. Erfurt may have delayed the eventual outbreak of war, but it was likely the two powers would ultimately come into conflict.

== In popular culture ==
The congress is an event referred to by Leo Tolstoy in his War and Peace (Book Two Part Three Chapter 1).
