= Principality of Erfurt =

Former principality

Principality of Erfurt Fürstentum Erfurt (German) Principauté d'Erfurt (French)
- 1807–1814
- Coat of arms

- Principality of Erfurt highlighted in yellow within the First French Empire (coloured in blues), shown with 1812 borders

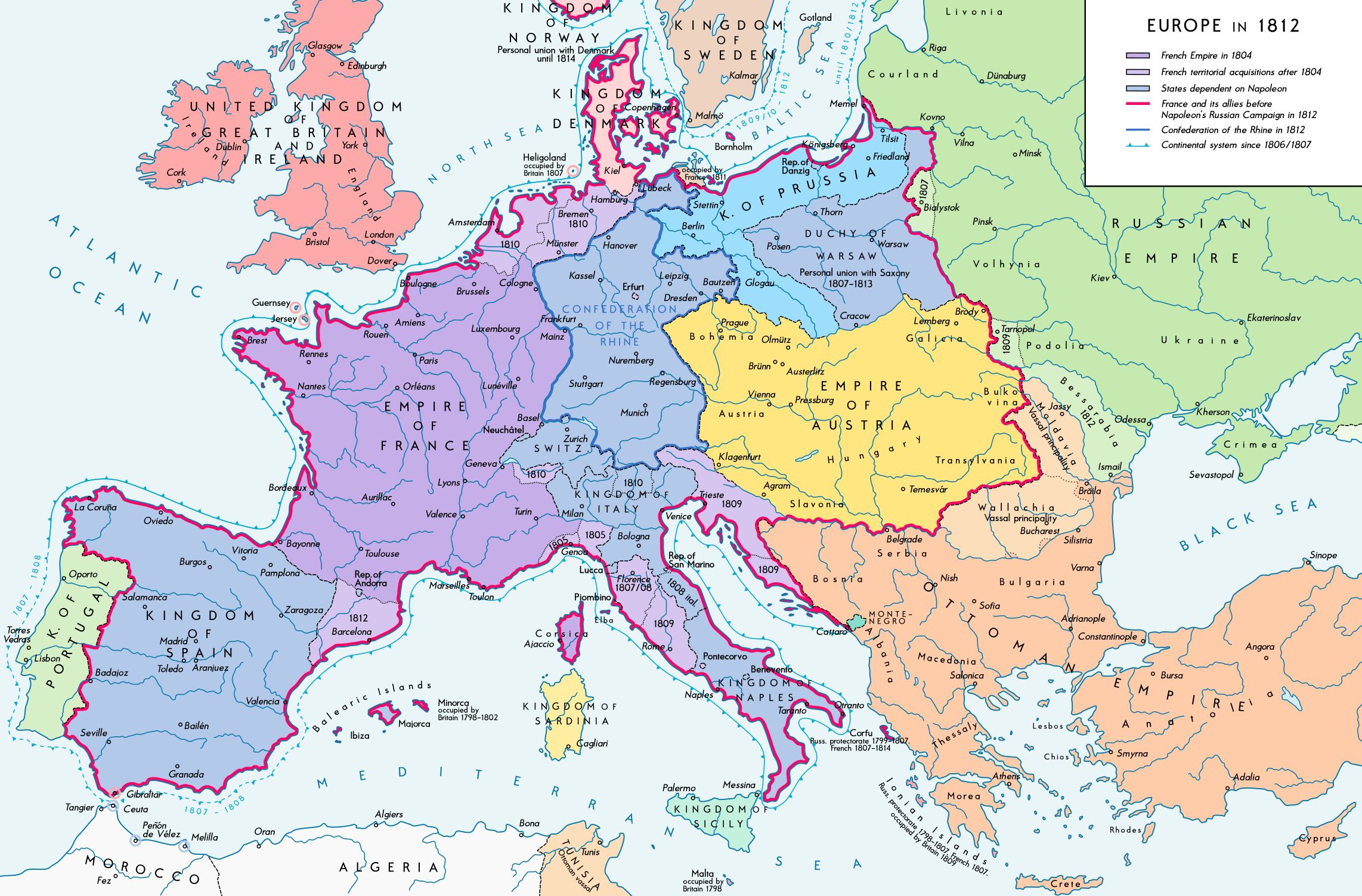
- The French Empire and sphere of influence in 1812. French Empire in 1804 French acquisitions after 1804 French satellite states Kingdom of Prussia French sphere of influence
- Status: Imperial state domain of the First French Empire
- Capital: Erfurt; 50°59′0″N 11°2′0″E
- Government: Principality
- Historical era: Napoleonic Wars
  - Capitulation of Erfurt: 16 October 1806
  - Principality established by Napoleonic decree: 4 August 1807
  - Congress of Erfurt: 27 Sept – 14 Oct 1808
  - Battle of Leipzig: 16–19 October 1813
  - Siege of Erfurt: 28 October 1813 – 5 May 1814
  - Congress of Vienna: Sept 1814 – June 1815
Preceded by	Succeeded by
Kingdom of Prussia; Duchy of Saxe-Weimar-Eisenach	Province of Saxony; Grand Duchy of Saxe-Weimar-Eisenach
- Today part of: Germany

The Principality of Erfurt (German: Fürstentum Erfurt; French: Principauté d'Erfurt) was a small state in modern Thuringia, Germany, that existed from 1807 to 1814, comprising the modern city of Erfurt and the surrounding land. It was subordinate directly to Napoleon, the Emperor of the French, rather than being a part of the Confederation of the Rhine. In 1814 after over seven months of siege, the city fell to Prussian, Austrian and Russian forces. Having mainly been Prussian territory before the Napoleonic Wars, most of the lands were restored to Prussia by the Congress of Vienna.

== Background and establishment ==
In the wake of the French Revolutionary Wars and the Treaty of Lunéville, the Holy Roman Empire underwent a process of substantial territorial reorganisation known as the German mediatization, under which Erfurt, since the 10th century a subject of the Electorate and Archbishopric of Mainz, was transferred to the Kingdom of Prussia, to compensate for territories Prussia lost to France on the Left Bank of the Rhine.

Fearing the rise in the power of Napoleon's First French Empire after their defeat of Austria and establishment of the French-sponsored Confederation of the Rhine, Prussia and Russia mobilized for a fresh campaign, and Prussian troops massed in Saxony as a part of the War of the Fourth Coalition. The twin battles of Jena and Auerstedt were fought on 14 October 1806 on the plateau west of the river Saale, between the Grande Armée and the forces of Frederick William III of Prussia. The decisive defeat suffered by the Prussian Army subjugated Prussia to the French Empire until the Sixth Coalition was formed in 1813.

After Jena and Auerstedt, a large number of refugees appeared at the Prussian fortress of Erfurt. At first they were refused entrance, but later the gates were opened and soon the city thronged with at least 12,000 demoralized soldiers. Attempts were made by some officers to return the troops to their regiments, but the men refused to cooperate. Joachim Murat, Marshal of France, sent French Colonel Claude de Préval into Erfurt under a flag of truce. The Frenchman demanded an immediate surrender, which the Prussian commandant initially refused. Karl August, Duke of Saxe-Weimar and Saxe-Eisenach, waited near Erfurt in the hope that large numbers of troops would join the retreat; when few did so, he withdrew toward Langensalza. Without support from Prussian Generalfeldmarschall Möllendorf, collapsed from injuries suffered at Auerstedt, the fortress commandant signed articles of capitulation; included in the terms were the surrender of the Petersberg Citadel and large quantities of gunpowder and munitions. Altogether, about 12,000 Prussian and Saxon troops under William VI, Prince of Orange-Nassau, became prisoners and 65 artillery pieces were captured. At the time of the capitulation, Murat had about 16,000 troops near Erfurt. Historian Francis Loraine Petre remarked that Erfurt was the first of a series of "pusillanimous capitulations" by Prussian fortress commanders, writing that Napoleon's plans might have been delayed had the city held out for just a few days. Instead, the French emperor was able to immediately launch the entire army after his fleeing enemies.

== French rule ==
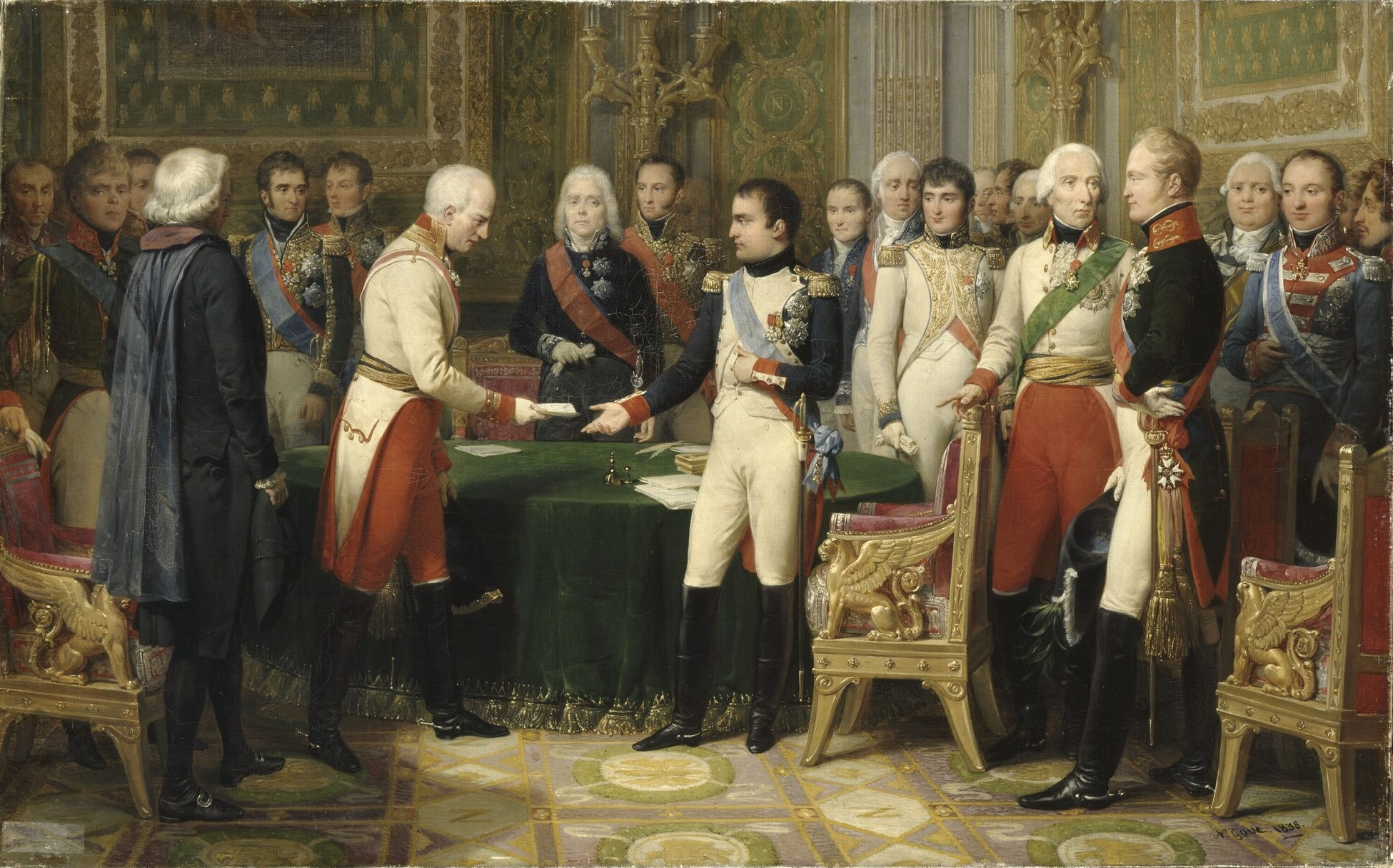
L'entrevue d'Erfurt, oil on canvas by Nicolas Gosse, showing the Congress of Erfurt — Napoleon (centre) is receiving Baron Vincent, ambassador of Austria, (left) with Talleyrand behind the table and Tsar Alexander I side-on, to the picture's right.

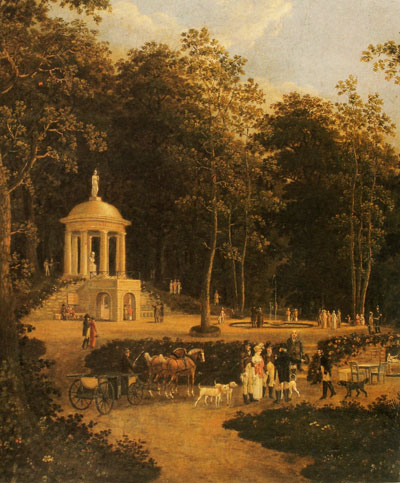
Die Napoleonshöhe im Steiger bei Erfurt, painted by Nikolaus Dornheim in 1812. Inaugurated in March 1811 to celebrate Napoleon's birthday, this Greek-style temple with grotto, flowerbeds and fountain in the Stiegerwald was burned in November 1813 and completely destroyed by Erfurters and their besiegers in 1814.

Erfurt was administered by a civilian and military Senate (Finanz- und Domänenkammer Erfurt) under a French governor, based in the Kurmainzische Statthalterei, previously the seat of city's governor under the Electorate. Napoleon first visited the principality on 23 July 1807, inspecting the citadels and fortifications.

On 4 August 1807, Napoleon attached the Saxe-Weimar territory of Blankenhain and declared the Principality of Erfurt to be directly subordinate to himself as an "imperial state domain", separate from the Confederation of the Rhine (which was nominally a French protectorate set up to replace the now-defunct Holy Roman Empire), which the surrounding Thuringian states had joined.

On 27 September 1808, Napoleon was ceremonially presented the keys to the city at the Brühler-Tor before going to meet Tsar Alexander I on the road to Weimar to re-enter the city with the tsar. Between 27 September and 14 October 1808, Napoleon hosted the Congress of Erfurt in the principality, intended to reaffirm the alliance with the Tsar, which had been concluded the previous year with the Treaties of Tilsit at the end of the War of the Fourth Coalition. The meeting became a great conference involving an array of kings, princes, dukes, barons and notables from all over Europe, including the kings of Saxony, Bavaria, Württemberg and Westphalia (the last being Napoleon's brother Jérôme). The resulting convention recognised the Russian conquests of Finland from Sweden and the Danubian Principalities from the Ottoman Empire and stated that, should France go to war again with Austria, Russia should make common cause, though the tsar's support in the War of the Fifth Coalition was minimal.

During their administration, the French introduced street lighting and a tax on foreign horses to pay for maintaining the road surface. The Peterskirche suffered under the French occupation, with its inventory being auctioned off to other local churches — including the organ, bells and even the tower of the Corpus Christi chapel (Fronleichnamskapelle) — and the former monastery's library being donated to the University of Erfurt (and then to the Boineburg Library when the university closed in 1816). Similarly the Cyriaksburg Citadel (Zitadelle Cyriaksburg) was damaged by the French with the city-side walls being partially dismantled in the hunt for imagined treasures from the convent, with workers being paid from the sale of the building materials.

In 1811, to commemorate the birth of the Prince Imperial (later Napoleon II), a 70-foot (21-metre) ceremonial column (Die Napoleonsäule) of wood and plaster was erected on the common, on the instigation of the French administration and funded by the city treasury. Inaugurated on 20 March 1811; it was burned and destroyed by the citizenry on 6 January 1814 when the Sixth Coalition finally entered the city after over 2 months of siege. Similarly, the Napoleonshöhe — a Greek-style temple topped by a winged victory with shield, sword and lance and containing a bust of Napoleon sculpted by Friedrich Döll — was erected in the Stiegerwald woods on the direction of the senate-president von Resch; the design included a grotto with fountain and flower beds, using a large water basin removed from the Peterskirche. Inaugurated with ceremony on 14 August 1811 after extravagant celebrations for Napoleon's birthday, with a eulogy on Napoleon being given by Resch to little celebration from the citizenry, the French administration commissioned a painting of the temple from Nikolaus Dornheim in 1812, but it was burned on 1 November 1813 and completely destroyed by Erfurters and their besiegers in 1814. The celebrations of Napoleon's birthday were repeated in 1812, with a concert in the Predigerkirche, conducted by Louis Spohr.

== Siege and fall ==
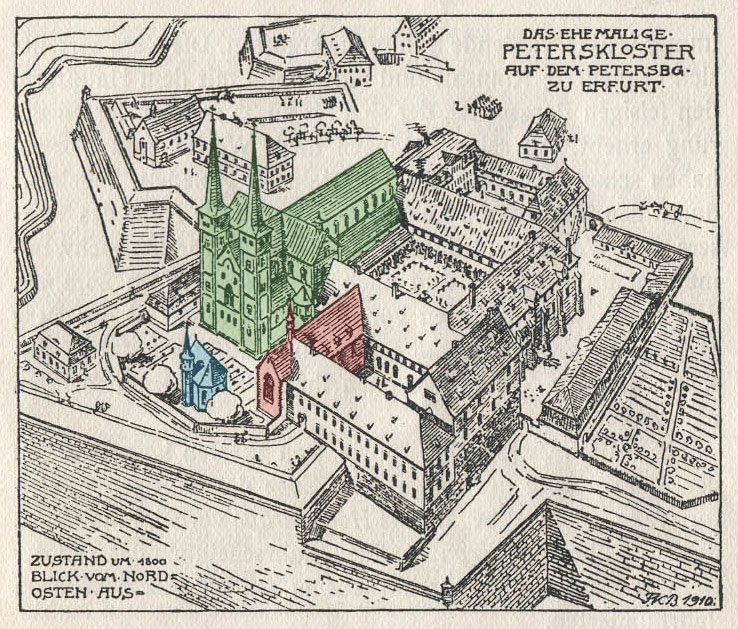
The former Benedictine monastery buildings of Peterskloster within the Petersberg Citadel, as seen from the northeast in 1800. These buildings were damaged in the siege by the Sixth Coalition; in green is the Peterskirche, blue is the Corpus Christi chapel (Fronleichnamskapelle) and red is the Chapel of Saint Anne.

After his disastrous invasion of Russia, Napoleon briefly rested the remnants of the Grande Armée in Erfurt on 15 December 1812, on their way back to France proper.

With the Sixth Coalition forming after French defeat in Russia, on 24 February 1813 Napoleon ordered the Petersberg Citadel to prepare for siege, visiting the city on 25 April to inspect the fortifications, in particular both Citadels. The French authorities banned all burials in city cemeteries from 26 June 1813, setting up a single central cemetery in Johannesplatz, an arrangement that continued until 9 December 1816 after the city had been restored to Prussia. After the imposition of martial law on the Petersberg Citadel in 1813, the Peterskirche was used as a warehouse and the counts of Gleichen were reburied in Erfurt Cathedral.

On 10 July 1813, Napoleon put in charge of the defences of Erfurt Brigadier General Alexandre d'Alton, baron of the Empire. However, when the French decreed that 1000 men would be conscripted into the Grande Armée, the recruits were joined by other citizens in rioting on 19 July that led to 20 arrests, of whom 2 were sentenced to death by French court-martial; as a result, the French ordered the closure of all inns and alehouses.

With the Sixth Coalition's decisive victory at Leipzig (16–19 October 1813), French troops head to Erfurt; Napoleon visited on 23 October, Erfurt being his only major weapons and storage depot east of the Rhine. Within a week of Leipzig, however, Erfurt was besieged by Prussian, Austrian and Russian troops under the command of Prussian Lt Gen von Kleist. Coalition shelling of the Petersberg Citadel on 6 November caused substantial damage to districts to the north of the cathedral and the destruction of much of the monastery buildings and the Peterskirche.

After a capitulation signed by d'Alton on 20 December 1813 the French troops withdrew to the two fortresses of Petersberg and Cyriaksburg, allowing for the Coalition forces to march into Erfurt on 6 January 1814 through the Schmidtstedter Gate, to jubilant greetings; the Napoleonsäule ceremonial column was burned and destroyed as a symbol of the citizens' oppression under the French. After a call for volunteers 3 days later, 300 Erfurters joined the Coalition armies in France.

Finally, in May 1814, the French capitulated, with 1,700 French troops vacating the Petersberg and Cyriaksburg fortresses. During the two and a half months of siege, the mortality rate rose in the city greatly; 1,564 Erfurt citizens died in 1813, around a thousand more than the previous year.

After the Congress of Vienna, Erfurt was restored to Prussia on 21 June 1815, becoming the capital of one of the three districts (Regierungsbezirke) of the new Province of Saxony, but some southern and eastern parts of Erfurter lands joined Blankenhain in being transferred to the Grand Duchy of Saxe-Weimar-Eisenach the following September. Although enclosed by Thuringian territory in the west, south and east, the city remained part of the Prussian Province of Saxony until 1944.
