= Foreign policy of France under the July Monarchy =

French foreign policy from 1830 to 1840

The foreign policy of France under the July Monarchy from 1830 to 1840 was characterized by two primary elements: a new system of alliances, notably the rapprochement with the United Kingdom within the "Entente Cordiale," and the French conquest of Algeria. This policy aimed to maintain peace with European neighbors, as summarized by Casimir Perier's statement: "peace without compromising honor."

== Recognition of the new regime by foreign powers ==
The July Revolution of 1830 in France caused concern among European powers, who feared a resurgence of revolutionary fervor similar to that following Napoleon's return from Elba in 1815. This concern led to a united front among European monarchies against the perceived threat of a republican France, particularly as vocal republican factions in France expressed a desire to avenge the defeat at Waterloo. However, France in 1830 lacked the capacity to engage in a major conflict with European powers. The economic crisis had strained finances, and the army was weakened: key forces had been deployed to Greece and Algeria, and the revolution had disrupted military discipline.

Thiers argued to Adélaïde d'Orléans on 30 July 1830 that foreign powers would likely view the new monarchy as a means to prevent a republic and contain internal agitation, provided it did not expand beyond France's borders. The accession of Louis-Philippe, constrained by legitimacy issues and focused on peace with neighbors, was seen as advantageous by European powers, who had grown wary of Charles X's independent actions. As Guy Antonetti observed: "The European sovereigns pretended to regret Charles X, but they recognized Louis-Philippe!"

Upon ascending the throne, Louis Philippe I prioritized obtaining recognition from foreign powers. After confirming that Charles X and his family had left France on 19 August, the king sent letters to European monarchs via personal emissaries, justifying the regime change and notifying them of the new reign. The letters described the July Revolution as an unavoidable event and expressed the king's regret for the "misfortunes" of the elder branch of his family. Louis-Philippe emphasized that he had reluctantly accepted the throne to prevent anarchy in France.

The United Kingdom, having grown frustrated with Charles X, welcomed the new monarchy, particularly given the Duke of Orléans' pro-British stance. Before receiving Louis-Philippe's letter, British Foreign Secretary Lord Aberdeen informed Metternich that the UK would remain neutral regarding France's political changes, provided France maintained stability. On 31 August, British ambassador Charles Stuart presented his letters of credence to Louis-Philippe, and on 3 September, Talleyrand was appointed ambassador to London. The UK's neutrality, signaling a break from the Holy Alliance, ensured that European powers would not interfere in French affairs.

In Austria, Emperor Francis I expressed disapproval of the events in France but recognized the July Monarchy on 5 September after assurances that the new regime would respect the 1815 treaties and not pursue territorial expansion. Austria's ambassador, Count Apponyi, presented his credentials to Louis-Philippe on 24 October.

Prussia's King Frederick William III followed Austria's lead in recognizing the new regime. Similarly, the July Monarchy received recognition from Spain's Ferdinand VII, whose ambassador presented credentials on 13 October, as well as from the kings of Sardinia and Denmark.

Russia's Emperor Nicholas I was less accommodating, though his ambassador in Paris, Pozzo di Borgo, had supported the July Revolution. Nicholas I, sensitive to issues of legitimacy due to his own ascension, recognized Louis-Philippe's government but used formal language that implied a lack of full sovereign recognition. Relations normalized in 1831 after the appointment of the Duke of Mortemart as ambassador to Saint Petersburg, but remained cool.

In Portugal, Dom Miguel ignored the new French regime. In response, France sent Admiral Roussin's squadron, which forced the Tagus on 11 July 1831 and compelled Portugal to accept French conditions on 14 July. In July 1833, Dom Pedro, supported by the British fleet, deposed Miguel and established a liberal regime, which Paris and London immediately recognized. The Duke of Modena, Francis IV, refused to recognize the July Monarchy, reflecting his hostility toward Louis-Philippe, despite familial ties through the king's maternal lineage. Modena never recognized the July Monarchy, and the legitimist pretender, the "Count of Chambord," married a princess from Modena in 1846.

By the end of October 1830, Louis-Philippe had secured recognition from all European powers by pledging to respect the 1815 borders and positioning his regime as a safeguard against anarchy in France.

== July Monarchy and Troubles ==
European monarchies recognized the July Monarchy as a bulwark against republicanism and the spread of revolutionary ideas. Their support was contingent on France maintaining internal stability and not exporting revolution. However, disturbances in Belgium, Poland, and Italy soon challenged the new regime.

=== Belgium ===
Occupied by French revolutionary armies in 1794 and annexed in 1795, the Départements réunis, or Belgian provinces, were separated from France in 1814. The Congress of Vienna in 1815 united them with the former United Provinces to form the Kingdom of the Netherlands under the House of Nassau. The UK financed fortresses along the French border to prevent French expansion.

==== Belgian Revolution ====
Dissatisfaction with William I of the Netherlands's rule led to unrest in Belgium by the late 1820s. On 25 August 1830, Brussels rose in rebellion, and Belgian militias halted Dutch troops on 27 September, pushing them back to the former border of the Austrian Netherlands. On 4 October, Belgium proclaimed independence, and a provisional government was formed, including Catholics Félix de Mérode and Emmanuel d'Hoogvorst and liberals Alexandre Gendebien and Charles Rogier.

In France, nationalist and revanchist factions saw the Belgian uprising as an opportunity to reclaim what was considered a lost French province. They advocated for military intervention, supported by liberal Catholics, patriots like Armand Carrel, republicans like Godefroy Cavaignac, Bonapartists like General Lamarque, and the petty bourgeoisie aligned with the "movement party" of Laffitte and Thiers.

However, such intervention risked provoking Prussian support for the Dutch king, who was the brother-in-law of Frederick William III. Prussia, having acquired Rhine territories in 1815, feared that French intervention in Belgium could lead to further territorial claims.

==== Independent Belgium ====
Louis-Philippe, following the policy of Louis XV in 1748, rejected the idea of reclaiming Belgium, as it would be unacceptable to the United Kingdom, which opposed French control over the Scheldt estuary. By reassuring the UK, Louis-Philippe sought support for a neutral Belgian state under European guarantee.

The Netherlands, Louis-Philippe explained to Guizot, have always been a source of conflict in Europe: no great power can tolerate their control by another. Let them be an independent and neutral state by general consent; this state will become the keystone of European order.

This approach also aimed to dismantle the fortified "barrier" established by the UK along the Belgian border.

The King of the French first informed Prussia and Russia that France would not intervene in Belgium but would not tolerate intervention by other powers. On 31 August, Foreign Minister Molé conveyed this to the Prussian ambassador, and the king told the Russian ambassador, Pozzo di Borgo: "If the Prussians enter Belgium, it is war, for we will not tolerate it." This introduced the "principle of non-intervention." Talleyrand then proposed to the UK that France renounce Belgium in exchange for its neutrality. The British government agreed and suggested discussing the Belgian question at the conference of the five powers (UK, Austria, Prussia, Russia, and France) in London, originally convened for Greek affairs.

The Belgian provisional government convened a National Congress, which decided in late November 1830 that Belgium would be a constitutional monarchy and excluded members of the House of Nassau from the throne. However, the London powers considered installing the Prince of Orange, son of the King of the Netherlands, to minimize disruption to the 1815 treaties.

The Tory government of Wellington, committed to the 1815 treaties, was replaced on 22 November by a Whig government under Lord Grey, with Lord Palmerston as Foreign Secretary, who was more flexible. Additionally, the Russian army was occupied with the Polish uprising that began on 29 November, preventing support for William I. Palmerston and Talleyrand then directed the London conference, which imposed an armistice on the Dutch and Belgians, recognized Belgium's independence (20 December), and declared Belgium a perpetually neutral state under the powers' guarantee. However, the conference awarded the King of the Netherlands control over Luxembourg and Limburg (20 January 1831), which the Belgians contested, leading to further conflict.

Starting in late December 1830, the Belgians sought a king. Louis-Philippe noted to Marshal Maison on 11 November that the Belgian National Congress resembled the 1790 assembly under Vandernoot and Van Enpen, being largely aristocratic and clerical. This made it unlikely for a Protestant prince to be elected.

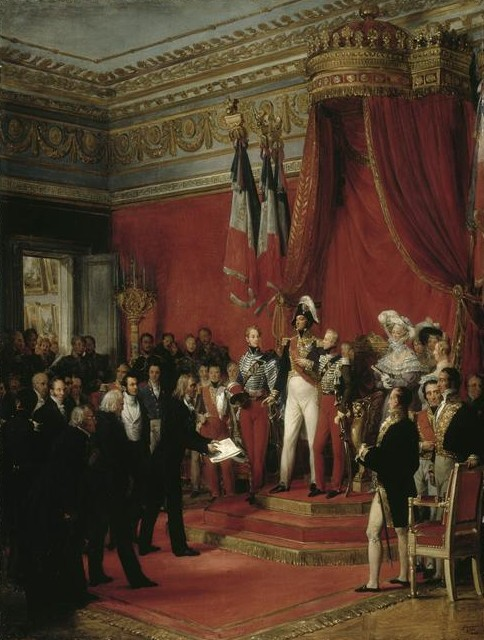
Louis Philippe Declining the Crown of Belgium Offered to His Son by Nicolas Gosse, 1836, Palace of Versailles

Louis-Philippe also stated that neither a French nor an Austrian prince could become King of the Belgians: "It is believed that the Belgians would be inclined to ask for one of my sons, but this idea must be dismissed, and it must not even be discussed, since in the current state of Europe, this discussion would be dangerous and would present no chance of success. The same can be said of all the archdukes of Austria."

Potential candidates were limited:

- Count Félix de Mérode, a member of the Belgian provisional government, was a Catholic married to a Frenchwoman related to La Fayette. Despite his noble lineage, he declined to run, citing his non-royal status, but could serve as regent or hereditary grand duke.
- Auguste de Beauharnais (1810), Duke of Leuchtenberg, son of Eugène de Beauharnais and Princess Augusta of Bavaria, was supported by French Bonapartists but opposed by Louis-Philippe, who distrusted the "Beauharnais" connection to Napoleon.
- Charles Ferdinand of the Two Sicilies (1811), Prince of Capua, brother of King Ferdinand II of the Two Sicilies and nephew of Queen Maria Amalia.
- Prince Otto of Bavaria (1815), second son of King Ludwig I of Bavaria, was the UK's candidate.
- Prince John of Saxony (1801), nephew of King Anthony of Saxony.
- Ferdinand of Savoy (1822), Duke of Genoa, second son of the Prince of Carignano, heir to Charles Felix of Sardinia.
- The Belgian National Congress showed sympathy for the Duke of Leuchtenberg. In January 1831, Louis-Philippe indicated that he would not recognize Leuchtenberg as king and refused to consider his son, the Duke of Nemours, for the throne, but supported Otto of Bavaria, offering a marriage alliance with one of his daughters. Within the Congress, factions supported Leuchtenberg, Nemours, or the Archduke Charles, Duke of Teschen. On 3 February, Nemours was elected king with 97 votes out of 192.

Talleyrand negotiated with the UK to ensure that France would decline the Belgian throne for Nemours if the powers agreed not to recognize Leuchtenberg. On 17 February 1831, Louis-Philippe informed the Belgian delegation that he could not accept their offer due to his commitment to European peace and lack of dynastic ambition. The Belgians then appointed Surlet de Chokier as regent and resumed their search for a king.

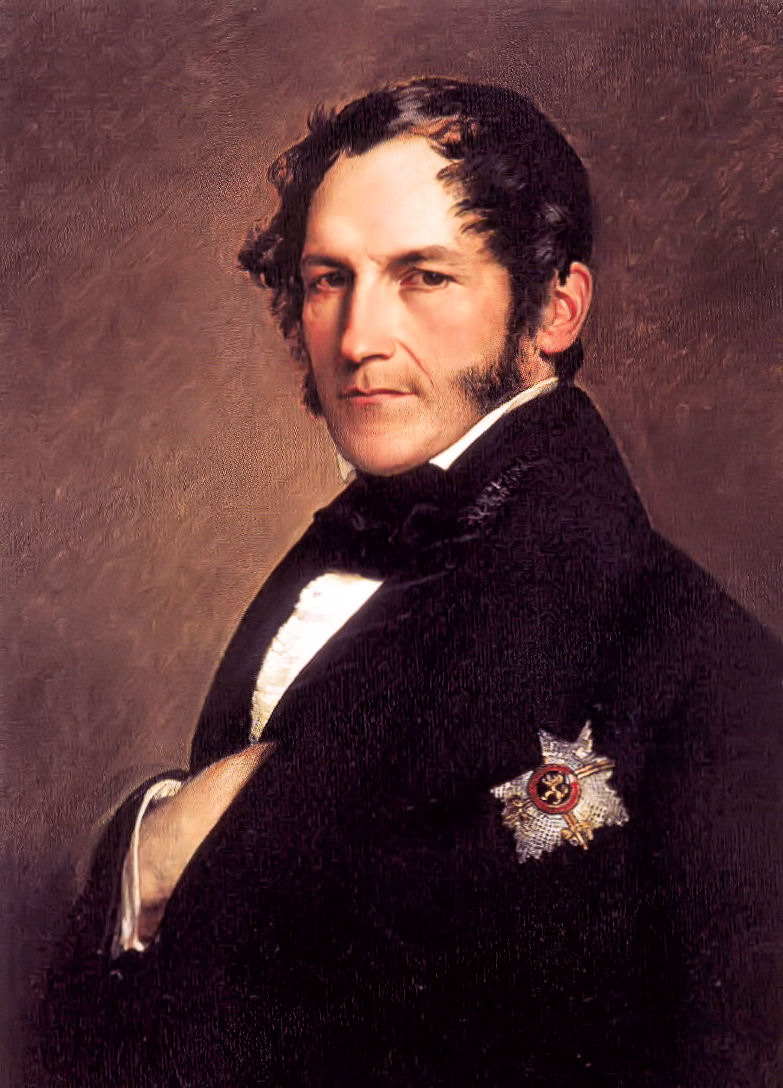
Leopold of Saxe-Coburg

The candidacies of John of Saxony, Otto of Bavaria, and Charles Ferdinand of the Two Sicilies were reconsidered. Louis-Philippe officially supported the latter, a nephew of Queen Maria Amalia, but his chances were slim due to his ties to the reactionary House of Bourbon of the Two Sicilies.

The UK proposed Prince Leopold of Saxe-Coburg, widower of Princess Charlotte and uncle of Queen Victoria. Despite personal ties with Leopold, Louis-Philippe was cautious about this candidacy, which was backed by the UK and the Holy Alliance. Talleyrand, however, supported it and envisioned a marriage between Leopold and a princess of Orléans.

On 4 June 1831, the Belgian National Congress elected Leopold with 152 votes out of 196. He accepted the crown on 9 July and was enthroned in Brussels on 21 July.

==== Dutch military intervention ====
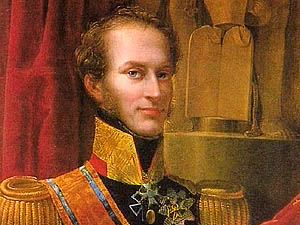
William I of the Netherlands

Leopold conditioned his acceptance on the National Congress recognizing the "Eighteen Articles" from the London Conference, which favored Belgian claims on Limburg and Luxembourg. The King of the Netherlands, William I, rejected the Eighteen Articles and invaded Belgium on 2 August 1831.

Leopold immediately requested aid from the UK and France. Casimir Perier ordered Marshal Gérard, commanding 50,000 men in the Northern Army, to assist the Belgians. Louis-Philippe sent his sons, the Duke of Orléans and the Duke of Nemours, to join the expedition. By 6 August, French troops were prepared to enter Belgium, but the Belgian government hesitated, citing constitutional requirements for parliamentary approval. On 8 August, Leopold authorized Marshal Gérard to enter Belgium. French forces reached Brussels on 12 August, prompting William I to withdraw to avoid conflict with France. The French army returned to France by mid-September at the request of the London Conference.

This intervention demonstrated France's military capability and commitment to its pledges. France had promised not to reclaim lost territories and honored this by ensuring Belgium's independence and neutrality, while dismantling the fortified barrier. Domestically, the outcome was favorable for Louis-Philippe: patriots celebrated, and revolutionaries took pride in "liberating" an oppressed people. France also succeeded in fracturing the Holy Alliance, forming a liberal Western alliance with the UK and Belgium against the absolute monarchies of Austria, Prussia, and Russia, thereby ending its isolation in Europe.

The London Conference developed the Treaty of the Twenty-Four Articles on 15 October 1831, granting Belgium parts of Limburg and Luxembourg, as well as control over the Scheldt estuary. Belgium accepted it on 15 November, but the Netherlands refused.

On 14 December 1831, the four powers signed a secret agreement with Belgium regarding secure places, excluding France. Louis-Philippe was angered, but Talleyrand reassured him with a note from the plenipotentiaries: "H.M. will find in this note expressed reasons to be completely reassured about the fear of a renewal of the Holy Alliance, with which the government seemed a little too preoccupied. When the United Kingdom and France march together on all major issues, and Europe knows and sees it, there is no possible Holy Alliance." This laid the foundation for the "Entente Cordiale," a key principle of the July Monarchy's foreign policy.

==== Alliance between France and Belgium ====
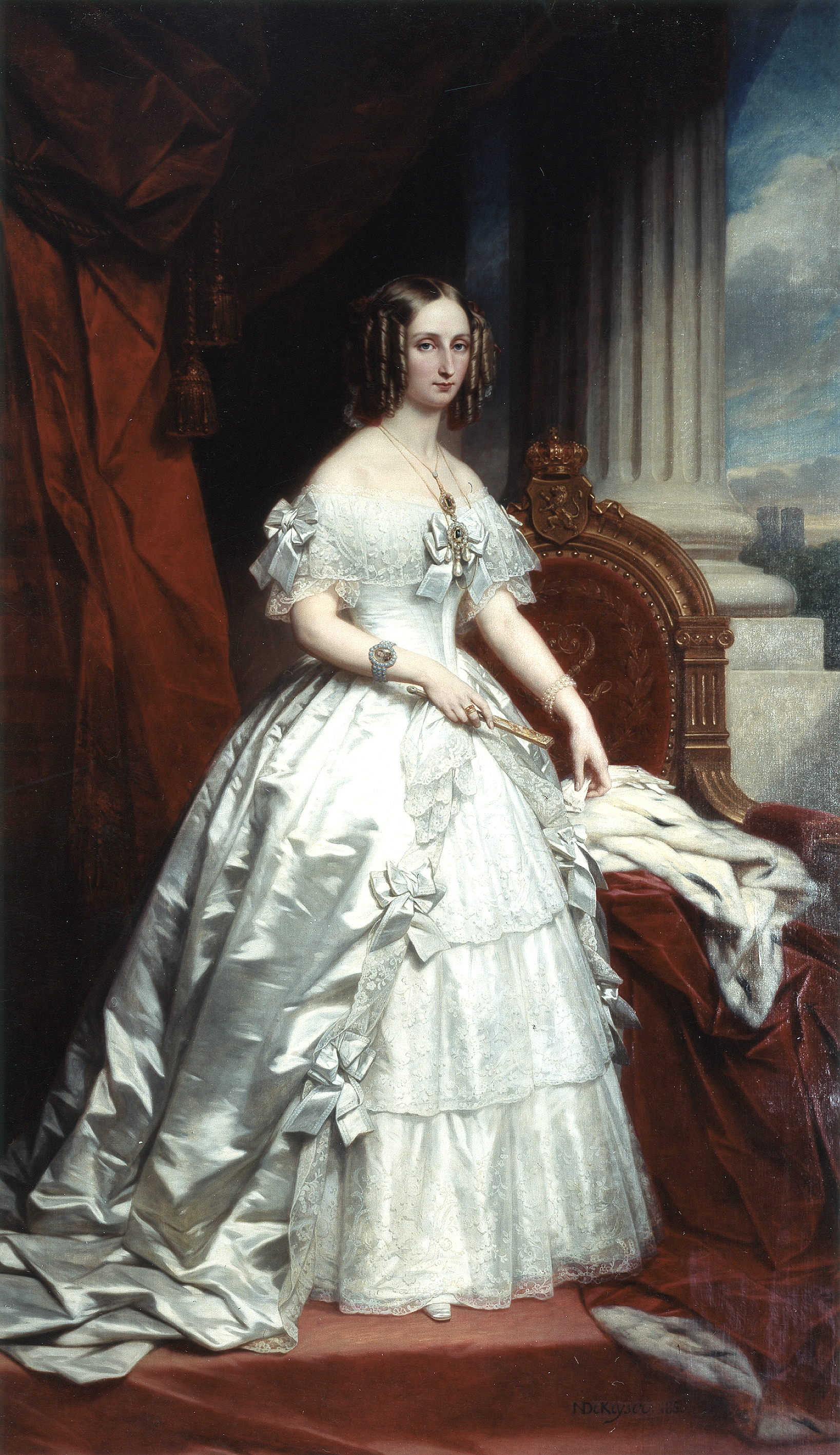
Princess Louise d'Orléans, first Queen of the Belgians

In 1830, Prince Leopold of Saxe-Coburg had sought a marriage alliance with Louis-Philippe's daughter but was initially rejected due to his uncertain status, a liaison with a dancer, and his Lutheran faith. These issues were resolved upon his accession to the Belgian throne: his position was secure, he ended his liaison, and he agreed to raise his children as Catholics. For Louis-Philippe, the marriage set a precedent for his children's future alliances.

Leopold visited Louis-Philippe at the Château de Compiègne from 29 May to 1 June 1832, where marriage terms were arranged between Leopold and Princess Louise d'Orléans, Louis-Philippe's eldest daughter.

The wedding took place in Compiègne on 9 August 1832. Bishop Gallard of Meaux officiated the Catholic ceremony, followed by Pastor Goepp of the Augsburg Confession for the Lutheran rite.

Despite Louise's initial reluctance due to the age difference, the marriage was successful and strengthened ties between France and Belgium. Leopold, close to the British court and uncle to Queen Victoria, helped reinforce the "Entente Cordiale" between France and the UK.

The Netherlands, refusing the Treaty of the Twenty-Four Articles, occupied Antwerp, prompting France and the UK to propose coercive measures at the London Conference on 1 October 1832. On 22 October, Talleyrand and Palmerston signed a convention for joint action.

Prussia moved troops to the Belgian border, but France dismissed these as symbolic gestures.

When the Dutch refused to evacuate Antwerp, Leopold I requested French intervention. On 14 November, the French Council of Ministers, with support from the king, Broglie, and Thiers, decided to act. The British government concurred that night.

Marshal Gérard, leading 70,000 men, including Louis-Philippe's sons, crossed into Belgium. On 19 November, French forces besieged Antwerp's citadel, which surrendered on 23 December. Louis-Philippe promptly handed the fortress to the Belgians and withdrew French troops, demonstrating France's reliability in the European concert.

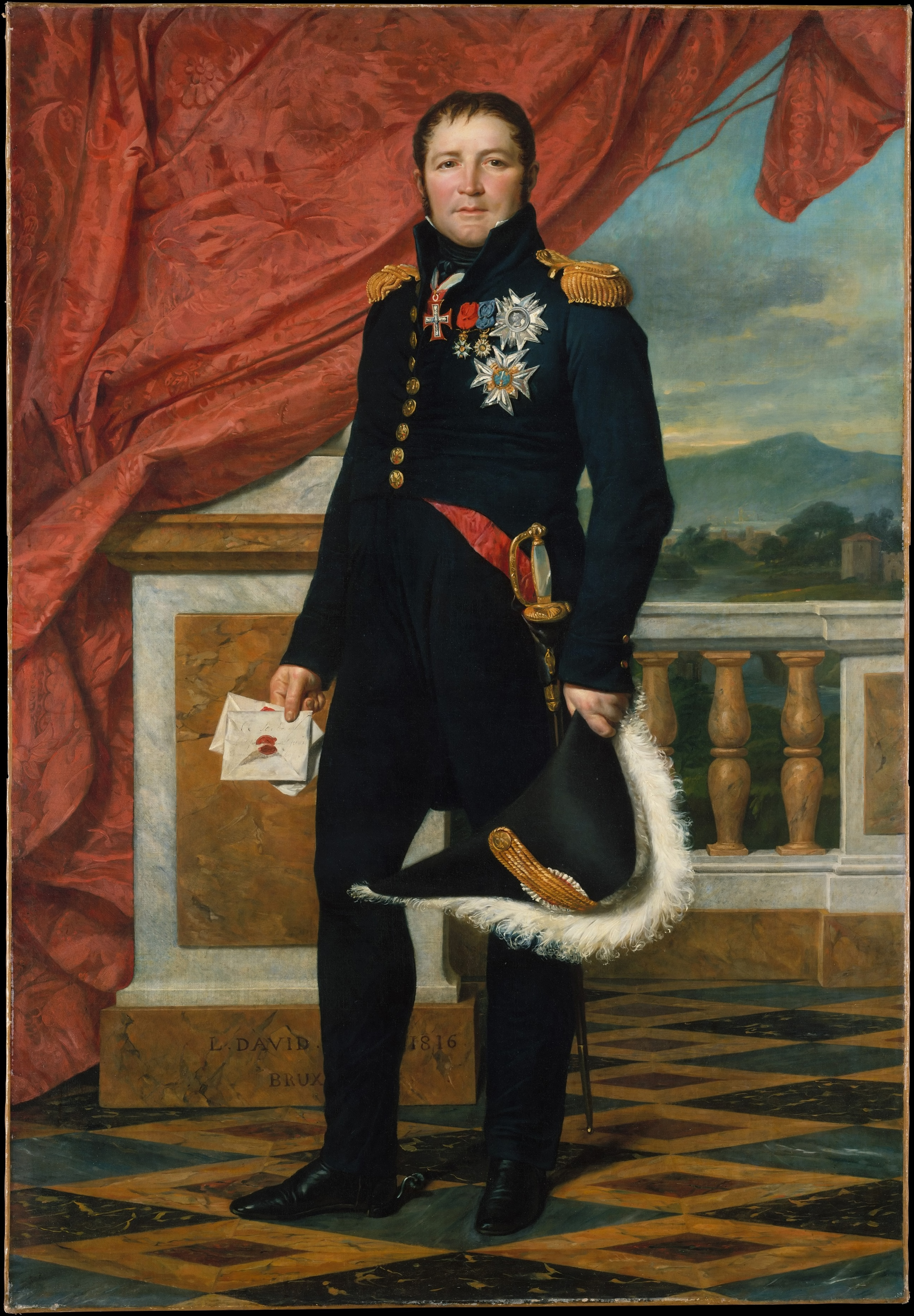
Marshal Gérard

==== Final settlement ====
In March 1838, William I accepted the Treaty of the Twenty-Four Articles, requiring Belgium to evacuate parts of Limburg and Luxembourg and repay its share of the common debt. Belgium resisted, but Palmerston, without consulting France, agreed with Austria, Prussia, and Russia to enforce the treaty. Louis-Philippe persuaded Leopold to comply, securing a reduction in Belgium's debt. An agreement was reached on 11 December 1838, ratified by the treaty of 19 April 1839, which resolved the Belgian question.

=== Polish question ===
France-Poland relations have historically been marked by mutual sympathy but limited practical support. France was unable to prevent the Partitions of Poland in the late 18th century. Emperor Nicholas I viewed the 1830 revolution in Paris as a threat to the European order established by the Congress of Vienna and considered intervening to restore Charles X. However, the November Uprising in Poland on 29 November 1830 diverted Russian forces, garnering widespread support in France from figures like Montalembert and La Fayette, who established a Franco-Polish Committee.

When the Polish Diet formed a provisional government under Prince Czartoryski and declared independence on 25 January 1831, French republicans called for military intervention, hoping to destabilize the monarchy. Louis-Philippe, however, deemed the French army incapable of sustaining a major conflict, with only 78,000 men available, including 40,000 in metropolitan France. During debates in the Chamber on 27 and 28 January 1831, Foreign Minister Sébastiani stated that while France sympathized with Poland, it could not intervene and that doing so would disrupt European peace.

In December 1830, Louis-Philippe sent the Duke of Mortemart, Charles X's former ambassador to Russia, to reassure Nicholas I of the July Monarchy's intentions. En route through Poland in January 1831, Mortemart informed Polish emissaries that France would not intervene militarily.

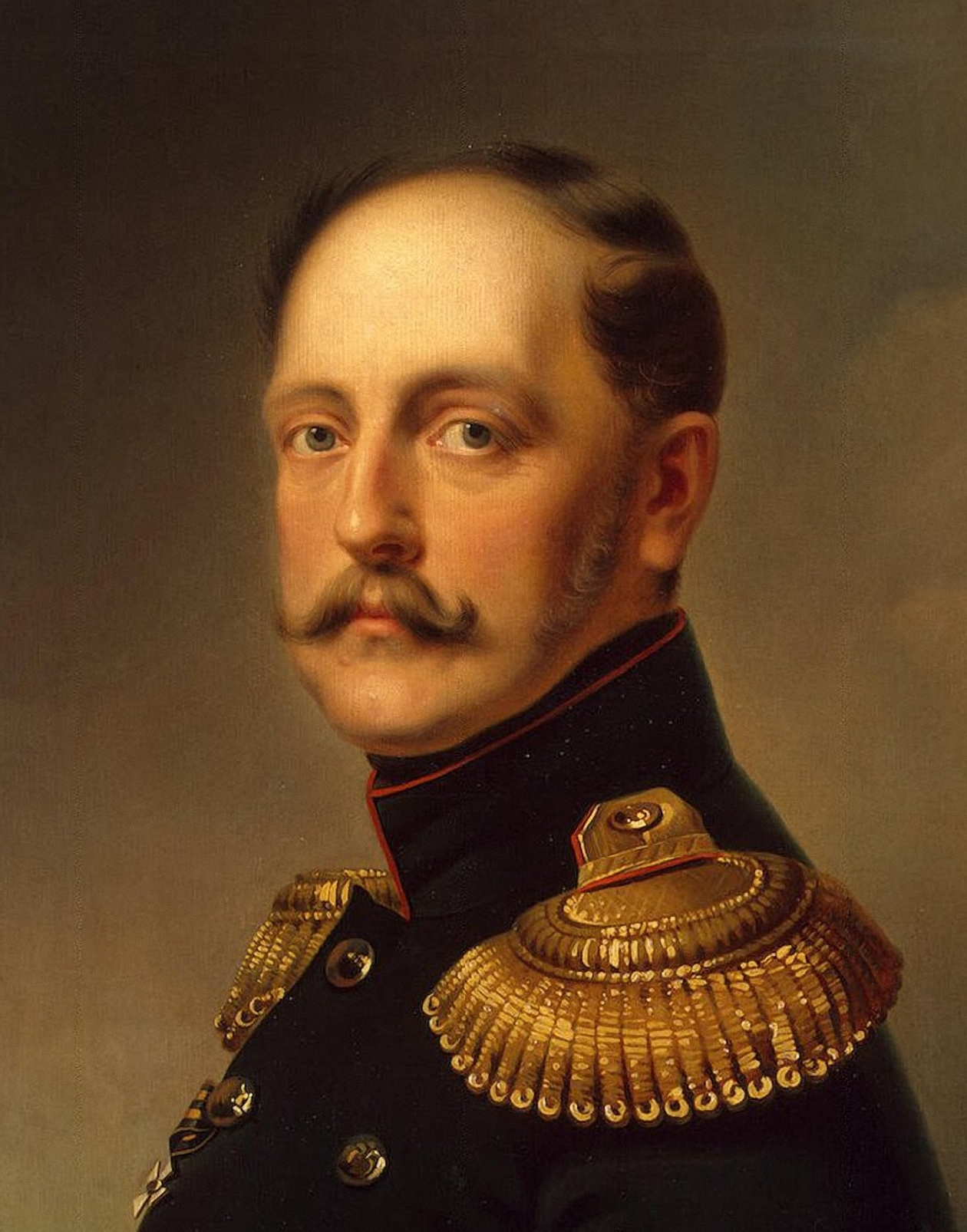
Tsar Nicholas I of Russia

France limited its support to encouraging the spread of the revolt to Lithuania, Volhynia, Podolia, and Ukraine to distract Russian forces. However, after initial setbacks, the Russian army resumed its offensive in July 1831. In Paris, debates on Poland during the address to the throne in late July saw deputies like Baron Bignon advocate for intervention, but Council President Casimir Perier resisted, securing vague language in the address. On 16 August, the Chamber adopted the address by 282 votes to 73.

The Polish insurgents were soon confined to Warsaw, which fell to Russian forces on 8 September 1831. News of the defeat reached Paris on 15 September, sparking protests and attacks on Russian and Austrian embassies. On 16 September, the left criticized the government in the Chamber, with Sébastiani's statement that "tranquility reigned in Warsaw" drawing ire. A debate from 19 to 22 September saw François Mauguin challenge Casimir Perier, but the Chamber moved to the order of the day by 221 votes to 136, effectively closing the Polish question.

At a court ball in February 1832, La Fayette attempted to discuss Poland with Louis-Philippe, who responded that he had fulfilled his duty by protecting France from war and Europe from conflict: "I consider that I have fulfilled my duty by protecting my country from the scourge of war and Europe from a general conflagration."

In 1836, France again refused to aid Poland when Russia, Austria, and Prussia invaded the Free City of Cracow, a refuge for Polish patriots. The powers occupied Cracow in February 1836, with Austria maintaining a garrison until 1841. France offered asylum to Polish exiles but took no further action, while the UK protested in vain.

=== Troubles in Italy ===
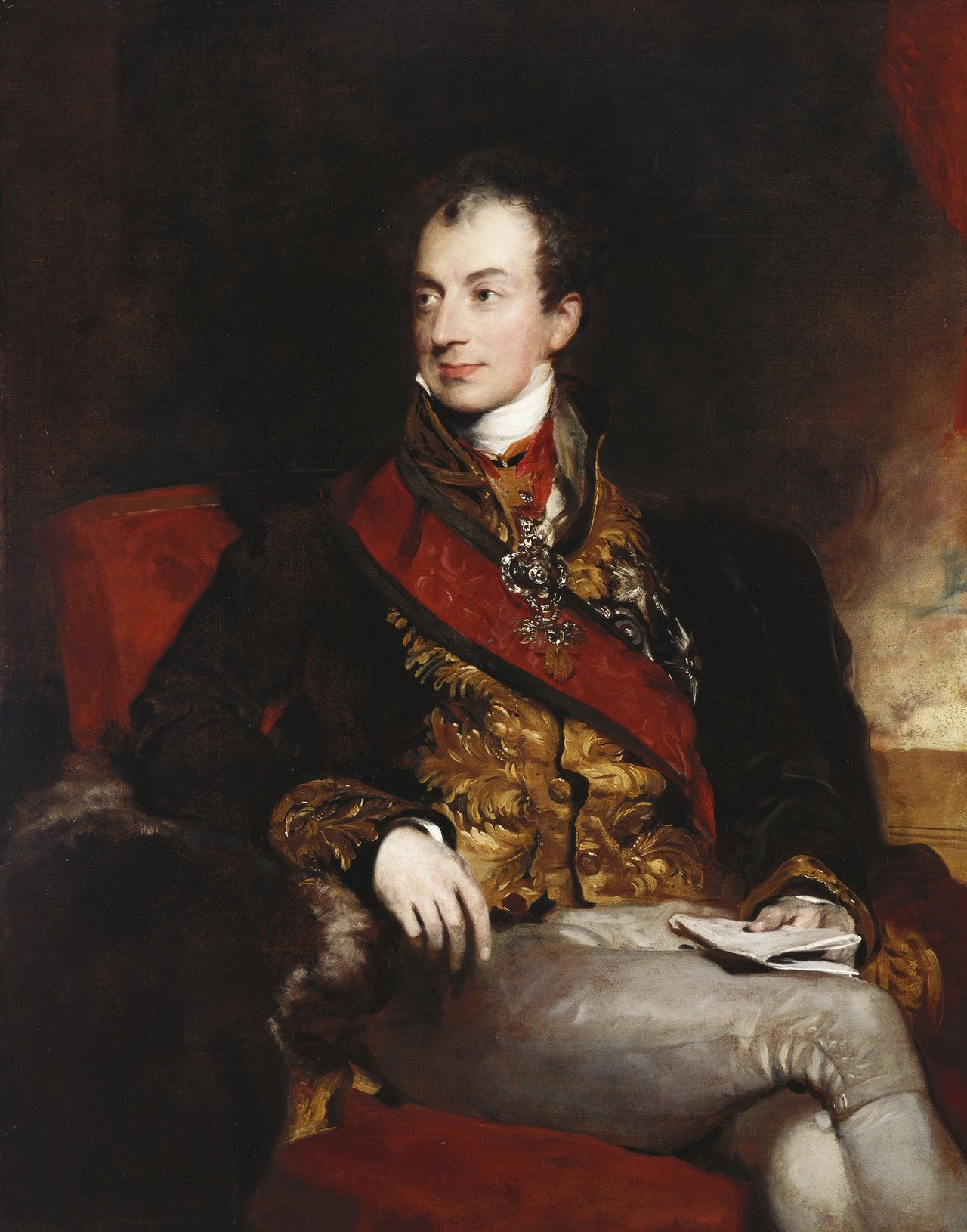
Prince Metternich

In early 1831, Italy experienced unrest. Following the election of Pope Gregory XVI on 2 February 1831, the Carbonari movement incited insurrections in the Papal States and the Duchy of Modena, forcing the duke to flee. The unrest spread across northern Italy.

The Pope, the Duke of Modena, and the Duchess of Parma requested Austrian assistance. Louis-Philippe and his government invoked the "principle of non-intervention," demanding that Austria refrain from intervening in Italy, as France would. However, France's domestic instability—marked by riots in Paris on 14 and 15 February 1831—weakened its position. Austria proceeded to cross the Po in March 1831.

Despite public statements, Louis-Philippe was content to allow Metternich to suppress the Italian insurrection, as it included Louis Bonaparte's sons, Napoleon-Louis and Louis-Napoleon, whose success could strengthen Bonapartism in France.

==== Ancona Affair (April 1832) ====
In late 1831, unrest resumed in the Papal States, with Romagna and the Legations refusing papal troops. The papal legate called in Austrian forces, who occupied Bologna on 28 January 1832.

In response, Casimir Perier dispatched the ship "Suffren" and two frigates with 1,100 troops to Ancona, which they occupied despite protests from Pope Gregory XVI and Metternich. The operation's forceful execution raised questions about France's intentions.

In Paris, the left celebrated, and Guizot claimed the action demonstrated the dissolution of the Holy Alliance and France's independent policy. Louis-Philippe publicly expressed displeasure, but Perier affirmed France's stance: France would not tolerate foreign intervention in other states and would occupy Ancona as long as Austria occupied Bologna. Gregory XVI accepted the "temporary" occupation of Ancona on 17 April, which lasted until 1839 when Austria withdrew from Bologna.

== Franco-British Entente Cordiale ==
The July Monarchy was established in 1830 with the support of the United Kingdom, which quickly recognized the new regime, preventing intervention by the Holy Alliance. This relationship was strengthened through the Belgian question, allowing France and the UK to neutralize the Holy Alliance and place a British-backed candidate on the Belgian throne, while France secured Belgium's independence and neutrality and married a princess of Orléans to the new king.

However, tensions arose as the UK sought to limit France's influence in the Middle East, where France supported Muhammad Ali, whose growing power concerned the UK. On 15 April 1834, the UK concluded an alliance with Spain and Portugal without informing France (see "The Quadruple Alliance of 1834"). Louis-Philippe recognized the risks of relying solely on the UK as an ally.

=== Attempts at Franco-Austrian rapprochement (1835-1836) ===
To counterbalance the UK, Louis-Philippe sought closer ties with the Holy Alliance, particularly Austria, aiming to signal to the British that France had alternatives and to find a suitable marriage for the Crown Prince, who was 25 in 1835.

Throughout 1835, France accommodated Metternich's interests:

In Poland, France tolerated the invasion of Kraków, isolating the UK, which protested the violation of the 1815 Congress of Vienna resolutions.

In Switzerland, where the July Revolution had inspired challenges to oligarchic cantonal constitutions, France replaced its ambassador, the Marquis de Rumigny, who was sympathetic to Swiss democrats, with the Duke of Montebello, who aligned with Austrian interests. Adolphe Thiers further pressured Switzerland in April 1836 to expel political refugees, threatening war if it did not comply, pleasing Metternich and Russian Foreign Minister Nesselrode.

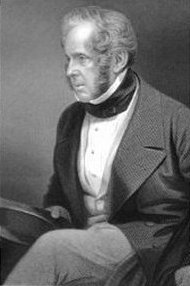
Lord Palmerston

Although Austria ultimately rejected the marriage proposal for the Crown Prince, the rapprochement temporarily softened British Foreign Secretary Lord Palmerston's stance. At the end of 1835, the UK proposed a triple alliance with France and the Ottoman Empire to maintain the territorial status quo in the East. Louis-Philippe conditioned acceptance on resolving disputes with the United States, as France could not risk conflict in both the East and America. On 8 December 1835, Louis-Philippe requested William IV's mediation with the US, which resolved the issues by February 1836.

The Rhine Crisis of 1840 was a diplomatic confrontation between Kingdom of France and the German Confederation, sparked by French demands to re-establish the Rhine River as France’s eastern border. amplifying German unification sentiments and underscoring the Rhine's geopolitical centrality as a potential flashpoint for Franco-German rivalry.

=== Entente Cordiale ===
Relations between France and the UK deteriorated in 1837-1838 due to the unpopularity of Foreign Minister Count Molé in London and Palmerston's hostility. France's refusal to intervene in Spanish affairs, contrary to UK wishes, further strained ties.

To improve relations, Louis-Philippe sent Marshal Soult as ambassador extraordinary to London for Queen Victoria's coronation on 28 June 1838. Despite some reservations about Soult's imperial background, he was well-received.

In the 1840 sulfur affair in Sicily, Adolphe Thiers prioritized UK interests over those of Marseille. Sulfur, essential for producing sulfuric acid and soda, was primarily sourced from the Kingdom of the Two Sicilies. A Marseille company had secured an exclusive concession from King Ferdinand II, which the UK opposed due to its industrial reliance on sulfur. With François Guizot's assistance, Thiers negotiated an agreement on 7 July to revoke the concession.

Britain continued to assert its strategic interest in European balance and peace. British diplomatic posture and its naval presence, particularly its alliance and coordination with Austria and other European powers, served as a check against French expansionism during the Rhine Crisis, effectively reinforcing the threat of a collective response should France militarily pursue its Rhine claims. Prime Minister Adolphe Thiers adopted an aggressive posture that strained diplomatic trust between France and Great Britain, invoking historical precedents from the Napoleonic era to justify territorial revisionism amid domestic pressures after a diversionary failed pro-Egyptian policy.

== Spanish marriages ==
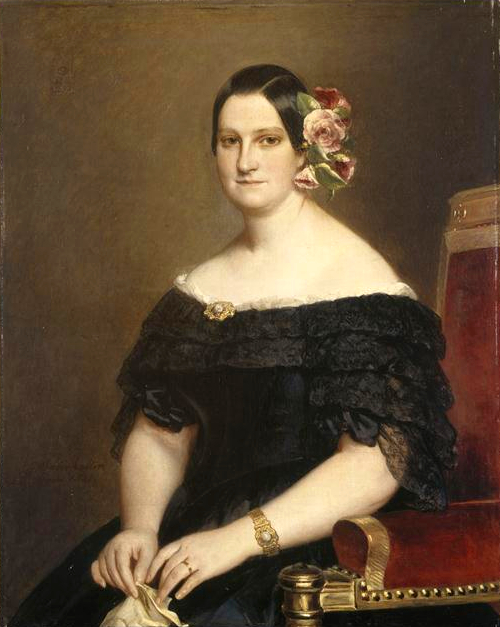
Queen Regent Maria Christina, portrait by Franz Xaver Winterhalter, Paris, 1841

Upon the death of Ferdinand VII on 20 September 1833, the Spanish crown passed to his three-year-old daughter Isabella II, with her mother, Maria Christina of Bourbon-Sicily, as regent. Ferdinand VII had abolished the Salic law to allow female succession, but his brother Don Carlos contested this, claiming the throne and leading the Carlist movement.

=== An Embarrassing Situation for the July Monarchy ===
The Spanish succession posed challenges for Louis-Philippe:

Maintaining the Spanish crown in the male line of Louis XIV was seen as crucial for securing the Pyrenéan border since the Peace of Utrecht in 1713. Female succession raised the risk of a foreign dynasty unfriendly to France ascending the Spanish throne.

The Carlist pretender, Don Carlos, represented absolutism and was allied with Charles X and French legitimists, supported by absolute monarchies like Austria. His victory would establish a legitimist stronghold south of France, threatening the July Monarchy.

Louis-Philippe and the British government recognized Isabella II, but her future marriage became a diplomatic concern.

=== Quadruple Alliance of 1834 ===
Regent Maria Christina sought to eliminate the Portuguese usurper Dom Miguel to weaken Spanish Carlists. Under UK auspices, Spain negotiated military aid to Portugal, leading to the Triple Alliance treaty on 15 April 1834 between Spain, Portugal, and the United Kingdom, without informing France.

When notified, Talleyrand protested to Palmerston, who then invited France to join, forming the Quadruple Alliance on 22 April 1834.

While the treaty maintained appearances, it placed France in a subordinate position. The UK pledged naval support to Maria II of Portugal and Isabella II of Spain, while France committed to act only "by common agreement" with its allies if military assistance was needed.

=== Military intervention in Spain ===
In May 1835, Spain requested military aid under the Quadruple Alliance due to the Carlist rebellion. Thiers supported intervention, but Louis-Philippe I, Duke of Broglie, and Palmerston opposed it.

By March 1836, Palmerston proposed joint intervention, with the UK acting at sea and France on land. Louis-Philippe, seeking to avoid displeasing Austria, refused, with Thiers' support.

In spring 1836, France considered intervention, forming a volunteer legion under General Jean-Louis Baux in Pau. On 13 August, following the La Granja pronunciamiento, which forced the regent to accept the liberal Constitution of 1812, General Lebeau announced imminent intervention. Thiers, then Council President, supported this to counter Austria's rejection of a marriage alliance and bolster his popularity. However, Louis-Philippe, opposed to intervention in Spain, clashed with Thiers, leading to his resignation on 16 August. On 24 August, the king clarified in "Le Moniteur" that General Lebeau's actions were not authorized by the crown. Louis-Philippe also ordered the dissolution of Lebeau's legion, but the government resisted.

The issue resurfaced in the Chamber of Deputies during the 1838 address debate. Louis-Philippe's speech on 18 December 1837 stated: "I continue to faithfully execute the clauses of the Quadruple Alliance treaty." The Doctrinaires, led by Guizot, proposed amending the address to implicitly endorse non-intervention. Despite Thiers' opposition, the amended address was adopted on 13 January, approving the policy but straining relations with the UK, which supported Spanish radicals while France backed constitutionalists.

== Eastern question ==
Sultan Mahmud II aimed to restore Ottoman power after Greece's independence but faced challenges from Muhammad Ali, supported by France.

In 1832, Muhammad Ali's son Ibrahim Pasha conquered Syria, defeating Ottoman forces at Konya on 21 December 1832, threatening Constantinople. Mahmud II sought Russian aid, leading to Russian troops landing in Constantinople in February 1833, which alarmed France and the UK.

To secure Russian withdrawal, France and the UK imposed the Treaty of Kütahya on 8 April 1833, granting Muhammad Ali hereditary rule over Egypt and sovereignty over Syria for life. However, before withdrawing, Russia forced the Sultan to sign the Treaty of Hünkâr İskelesi on 8 July 1833, establishing a military protectorate over the Ottoman Empire, giving Russia dominance in the eastern Mediterranean.

France and the UK allied to counter Russian influence over the Bosphorus, though they competed in Egypt and the Middle East, where the UK sought to limit French power.

Between 1833 and 1839, relative calm prevailed. In 1839, Mahmud II attacked Syria but was defeated at Nezib on 24 June. Mahmud II died a week later, and the Ottoman fleet defected to Muhammad Ali in Alexandria. Egypt sought hereditary sovereignty over Syria and the creation of an Arab Empire.

The UK advocated for Ottoman territorial integrity to prevent an Arab Empire or Russian control over the Straits. Austria, historically opposed to the Ottomans, favored their weakening, provided Russia did not benefit.

France and the UK, allied in Spain, were at odds in the East, while Russia, potentially aligned with France, was deterred by Nicholas I's hostility toward the July Monarchy. The Tsar aimed to exploit Franco-British rivalry to advance Russian interests.

Louis-Philippe sought to preserve the alliance with the UK and believed Muhammad Ali's position was unassailable. He supported Austria's proposal for consultation among powers, which maintained ties with the UK and isolated Russia.

Upon returning to power in 1840, Thiers attempted to broker a Franco-Ottoman-Egyptian agreement, excluding other powers, while Palmerston secretly negotiated a four-power agreement excluding France. Despite warnings from ambassador Guizot, Thiers proceeded, but Palmerston concluded the treaty on 15 July, presenting France with a fait accompli.

The treaty confirmed Muhammad Ali's hereditary rule over Egypt and offered him the pashalik of Acre for life, contingent on acceptance within 10 days. Failure to accept would reduce the offer to Egypt alone, and further refusal would allow the Sultan to depose him with military support from the four powers.

News of the treaty sparked outrage in France, fueling patriotic sentiment. Louis-Philippe's sons — Orléans, Nemours, and Joinville — were open to war. Louis-Philippe publicly aligned with popular sentiment while privately opposing conflict.

While taking preparatory measures—mobilizing troops from 1836 to 1839 (29 July) and beginning work on Paris's fortifications (13 September)—Thiers advised Muhammad Ali to be conciliatory. However, Palmerston escalated, and on 2 October, the British fleet bombarded and captured Beirut, leading the Sultan to depose Muhammad Ali. France faced further humiliation.

After negotiations, a compromise was reached on 7 October: France would abandon support for Muhammad Ali's claims to Syria but insist that Egypt remain untouched. This was communicated in a note on 8 October to the four powers. The UK eventually recognized Muhammad Ali's hereditary rule over Egypt, reverting to the 1832 status quo.

Subsequent negotiations led to the Straits Convention, signed in London on 13 July 1841, by the five European powers, including France. The convention barred foreign warships from the Straits but confirmed Muhammad Ali's hereditary pashalik over Egypt. The UK thus excluded Russia from the Bosphorus and Egypt from the Orontes.

== See also ==
- July Monarchy

== Bibliography ==
- Antonetti, Guy (2002). Louis-Philippe [Louis-Philippe] (in French). Paris: Arthème Fayard. p. 992. ISBN 2-213-59222-5.
