= August Friedrich Ferdinand von der Goltz =

Prussian politician (1765–1832)

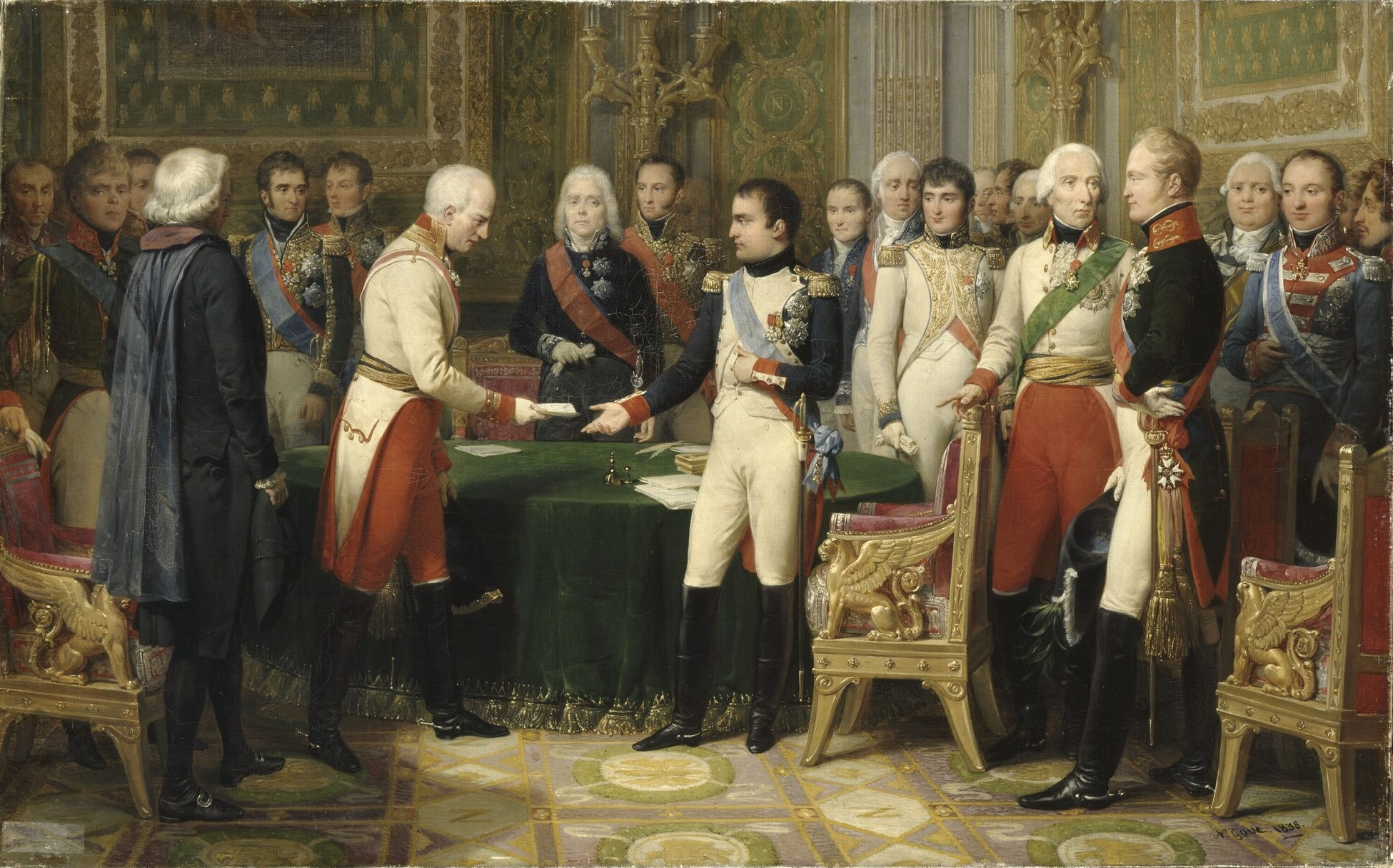
The Congress of Erfurt by Nicolas Gosse, depciting Von der Goltz in the crowd around Napoleon and Alexander I

August Friedrich Ferdinand Graf von der Goltz (20 July 1765 – 17 January 1832) was Minister for Foreign Affairs of Prussia between 1808 and 1814, the first person to hold that title.

== Early life ==
August was born on 20 July 1765 into the old noble Von der Goltz family. He was the elder son of Count Carl Friedrich von der Goltz (1727-1805) and his wife, Anna Maria Karolina Rummel von Lonnerstadt (1735–1809).

== Career ==
He entered the diplomatic service of Prussia in 1787. He help posts in the Prussian Legations at Copenhagen, Mainz, Stockholm, and St Petersburg. In 1807, at the Peace of Tilsit when Napoleon refused to negotiate with Karl August von Hardenberg and demanded his retirement, Goltz signed the treaty in place of Hardenberg and the next year became Minister of Foreign Affairs. Goltz represented Prussia at the Congress of Erfurt in 1808. He was head of the Corporate Governance in Berlin and after the Paris Peace of 1814 he became Oberhofmarschal to the Prussian court, in 1816, the courts representative to the Bundestag, in 1817 member of council of state. In 1824, he left the Bundestag and was reappointed Oberhofmarschal.

== Personal life ==
On 19 September 1796 in Dresden, he married Luise Juliane von Schack (1760-1835), daughter of Gneomar Berendt Wilhelm von Schack (1730-1776) and his wife, Julie Marie Luise von Wreech (1738-1769). They had one daughter:

- Countess Auguste Marie Amalie Luise von der Goltz (1798-1837); married Count Mortimer von Maltzan (1793-1843); and had issue

Goltz died on January 17, 1832.

== Sources ==
- "Гольц, Август-Фридрих-Фердинанд" . Brockhaus and Efron Encyclopedic Dictionary (in Russian). 1906.

Diplomatic posts
Preceded by Inaugural holder	Foreign Minister of Prussia; 1808-1814	Succeeded by Prince Karl August von Hardenberg
