= The Congress of Erfurt =

Painting by Nicolas Gosse

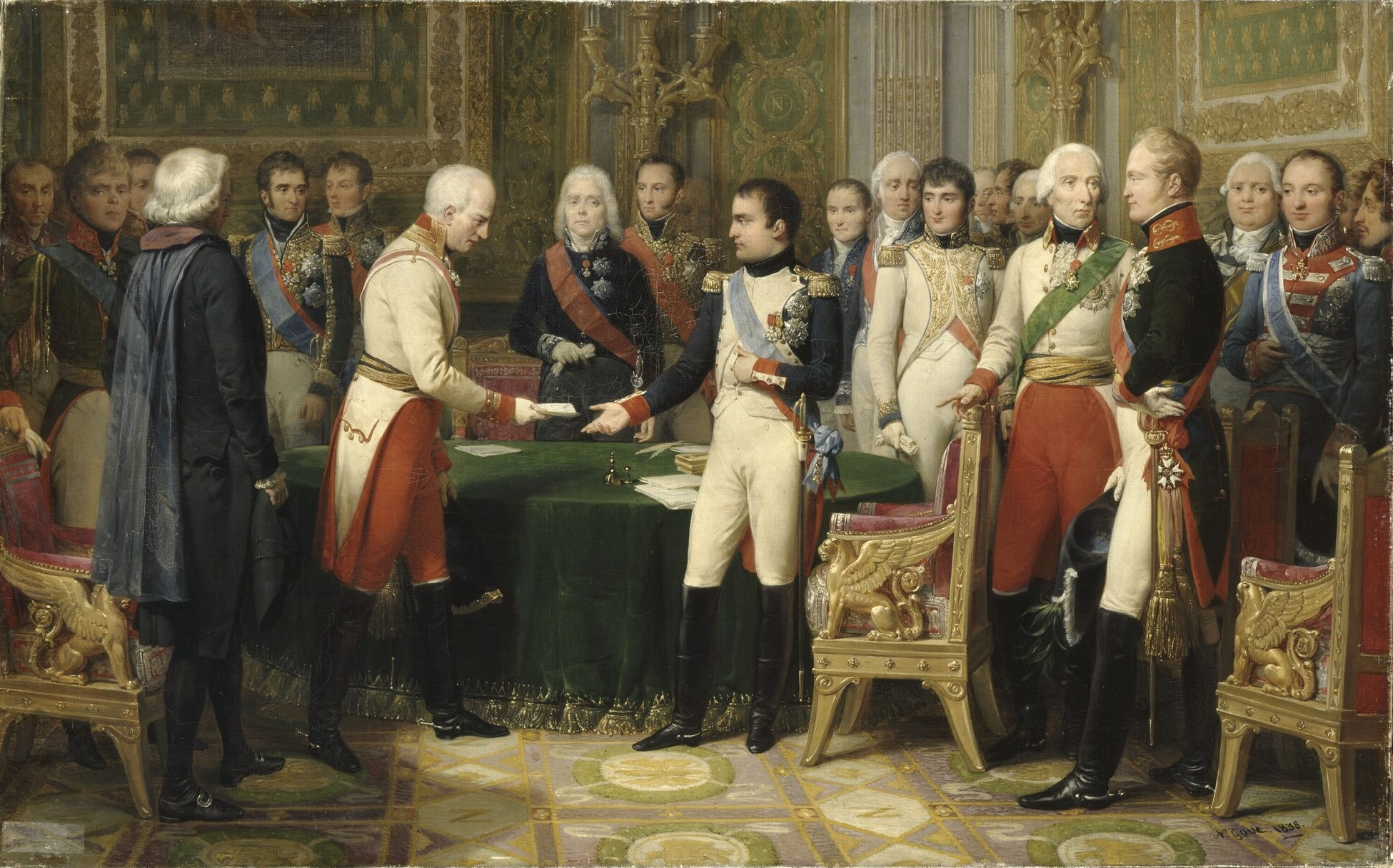
- Artist: Nicolas Gosse
- Year: 1838
- Type: Oil on canvas, history painting
- Dimensions: 66 cm × 107 cm (26 in × 42 in)
- Location: Palace of Versailles; Versailles

The Congress of Erfurt (French: L'entrevue d'Erfurt) is an 1838 history painting by the French artist Nicolas Gosse. It depicts the Congress of Erfurt held in 1808 in the German city of Erfurt during the Napoleonic Wars. It was the second face-to-face meeting between Napoleon and Alexander I of Russia following the Congress of Tilsit in 1807. Specifically it shows the moment when Karl von Vincent, the envoy of the Austrian Empire is received by Napoleon. Alexander is on the right of the picture while Napoleon's advisor on foreign affairs Talleyrand stands behind the table. The Prussian foreign minister August Friedrich Ferdinand von der Goltz is also shown. It was commissioned during the July Monarchy by Louis Philippe I and is today in the Palace of Versailles.

== Bibliography ==
- Franceschi, Michel & Weider, Ben. Wars Against Napoleon: Debunking the Myth of the Napoleonic Wars. Savas Beatie, 2008.
- Palmer, Alan. Alexander I: Tsar of War and Peace. Weidenfeld & Nicolson, 1974.
- Sieburg, Friedrich. La France de la royauté à nation, 1789-1848. Arthaud, 1963.
