= Louis Philippe Declining the Crown of Belgium Offered to His Son =

Painting by Nicolas Gosse

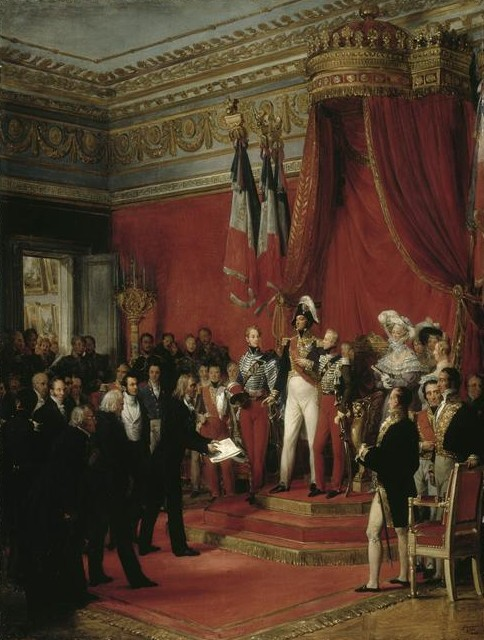
- Artist: Nicolas Gosse
- Year: 1836
- Type: Oil on canvas, history painting
- Dimensions: 118.5 cm × 90.5 cm (46.7 in × 35.6 in)
- Location: Palace of Versailles; Versailles

Louis Philippe Declining the Crown of Belgium Offered to His Son (French: Le roi Louis-Philippe refuse la couronne offerte par le Congrés belge au duc de Nemour) is an 1836 history painting by the French artist Nicolas Gosse. It depicts a scene on 17 February 1831 in Paris when Louis Philippe I of France refused an offer that had been made to his second son Prince Louis, Duke of Nemours to become king of the newly independent Belgium. Following the Belgian Revolution of 1830 the country broke away from the United Kingdom of the Netherlands. The National Congress of Belgium, desiring a Catholic candidate and wishing to secure French support, nominated Nemours to take the throne. Not wishing to offend his British allies, Louis Philippe rejected the offer on his son's behalf. The King is shown flanked by his sons Nemours and the Duke of Orelans as the Belgian politician Érasme-Louis Surlet de Chokier presents the offer.

Ultimately, Leopold of Saxe-Coburg emerged as a compromise candidate for the Belgian throne. He had close links to the British royal family (as the uncle of the future Queen Victoria) and was acceptable to the French. The following year he married Louise of Orléans, the daughter of Louis Phillipe and the elder sister of Nemours. The painting was commissioned by Louis Phillipe for the 800 Francs for the Musée de l'Histoire de France at the Palace of Versailles.

== Bibliography ==
- Boime, Albert. Art in an Age of Counterrevolution, 1815-1848. University of Chicago Press, 2004.
- Delcorde, Raoul. Les diplomates belges. Editions Mardaga, 2010.
- Huygebaert, Stefan, Angela Condello, Sarah Marusek & Mark Antaki (ed.) Sensing the Nation's Law: Historical Inquiries into the Aesthetics of Democratic Legitimacy. Springer, 2018.
- Koch, Jeroen, Van der Meulen, Dik & Van Zanten, Jeroen. The House of Orange in Revolution and War: A European History, 1772–1890. Reaktion Books, 2022.
- Price, Munro. The Perilous Crown: France Between Revolutions, 1814-1848. Pan Macmillan, 2010.
