= Nicolas Gosse =

French painter (1787–1878)

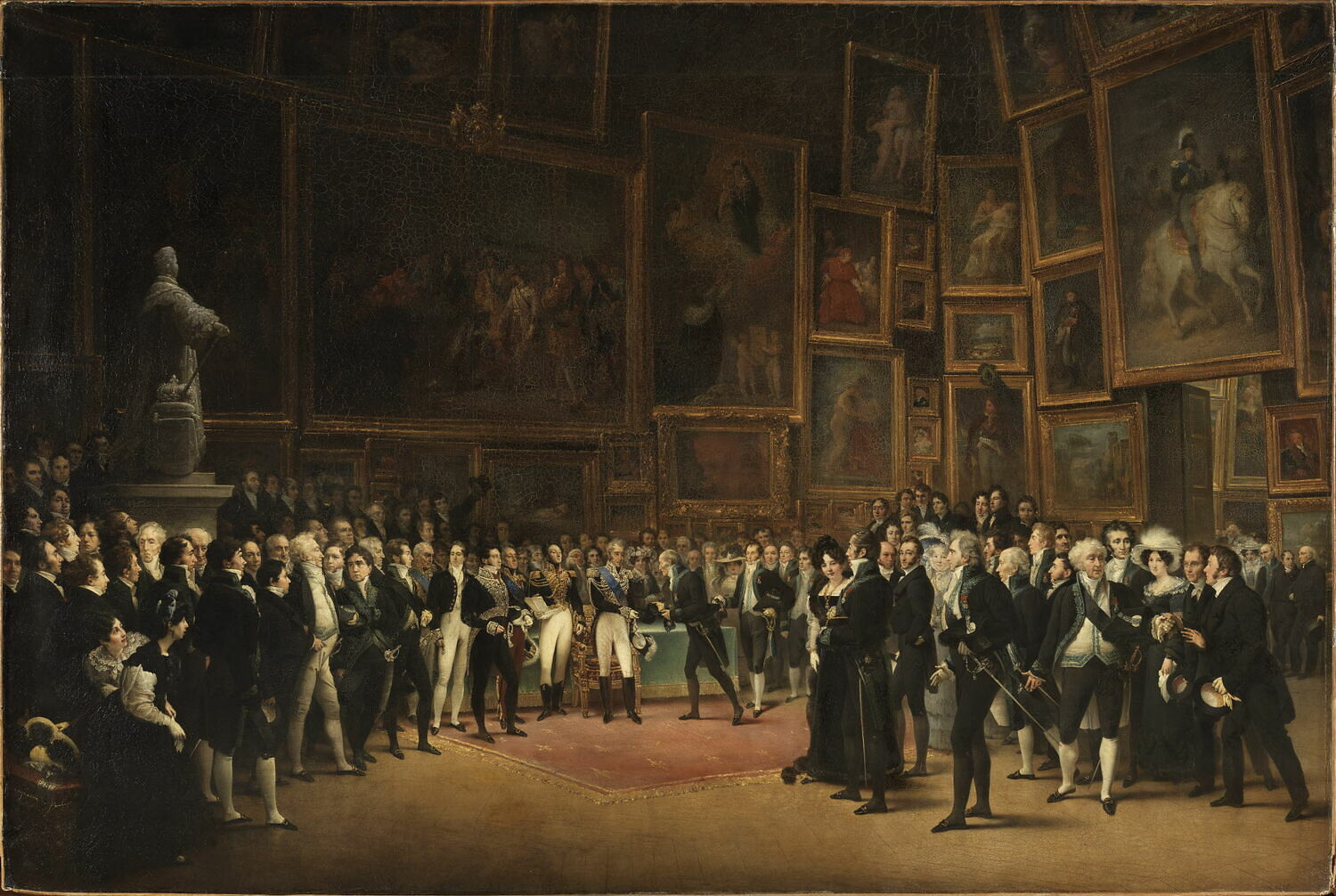
Gosse appears in the 1827 painting Charles X Distributing Awards to Artists by François Joseph Heim

Nicolas Louis François Gosse (2 October 1787 – 9 February 1878) was a French historical painter.

== Biography ==
Gosse was born in Paris, where he studied at the Ecole des Beaux-Arts and under Vincent, and became a skilled representative of the academic style prevailing in his earlier period. His principal works include: Napoleon I and Queen Louise at Tilsit, Meeting of Napoleon and Alexander of Russia at Erfurt, and Louis Philippe Declining the Crown of Belgium Offered to His Son all now housed in the Historical Museum at Versailles; and “Entry of the Duke of Angoulême into Madrid,” a wall painting in the Hôtel de Ville, Paris.

== Gallery ==
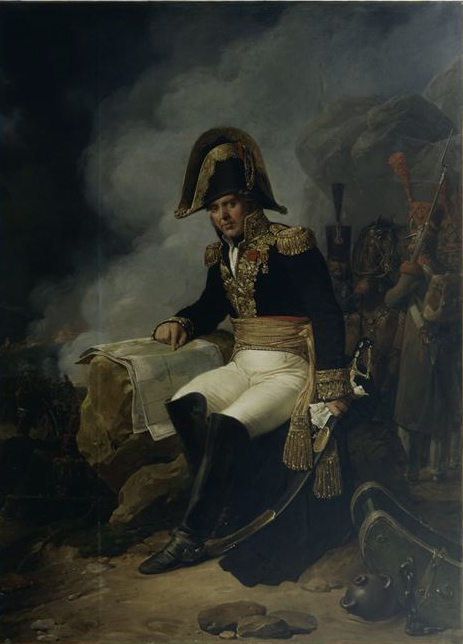
Portrait of Bernard-Georges-François Frère, 1808

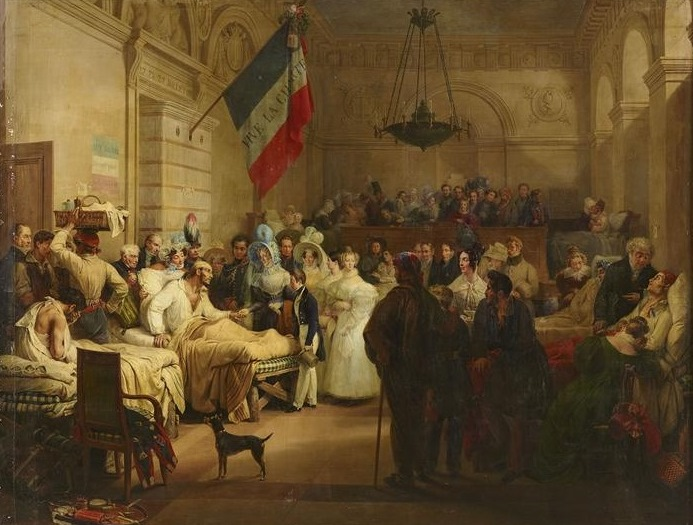
The Duchess of Orléans Visiting the Wounded of the Three Glorious Days, 1832

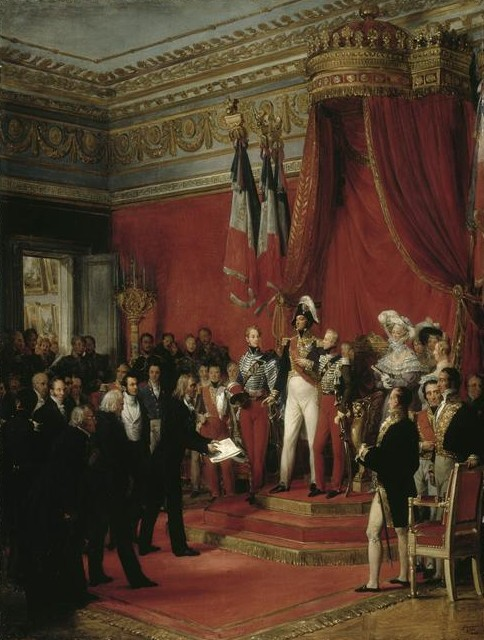
Louis Philippe Declining the Crown of Belgium Offered to His Son, 1836

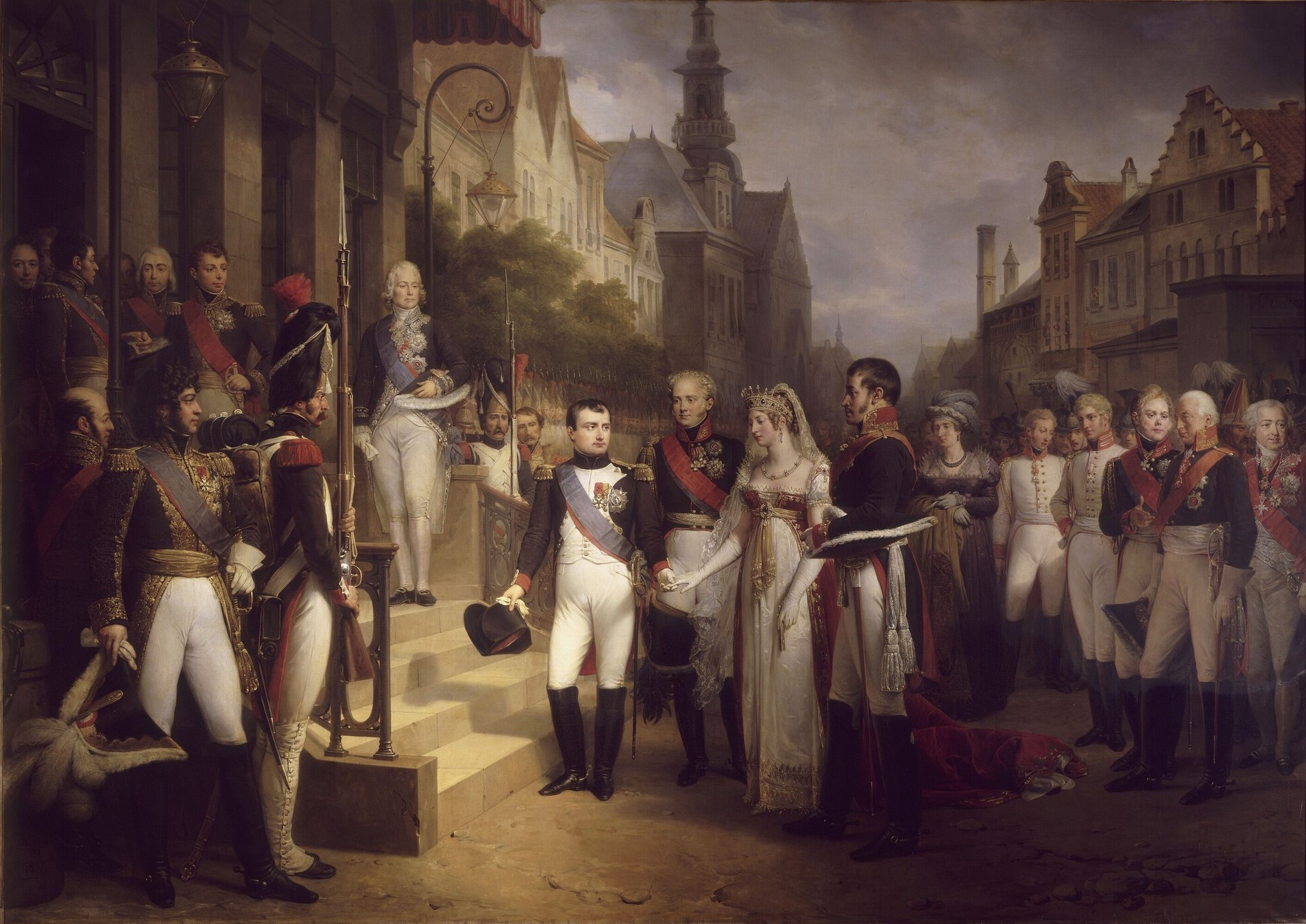
Napoleon Receiving the Queen of Prussia at Tilsit, 1837

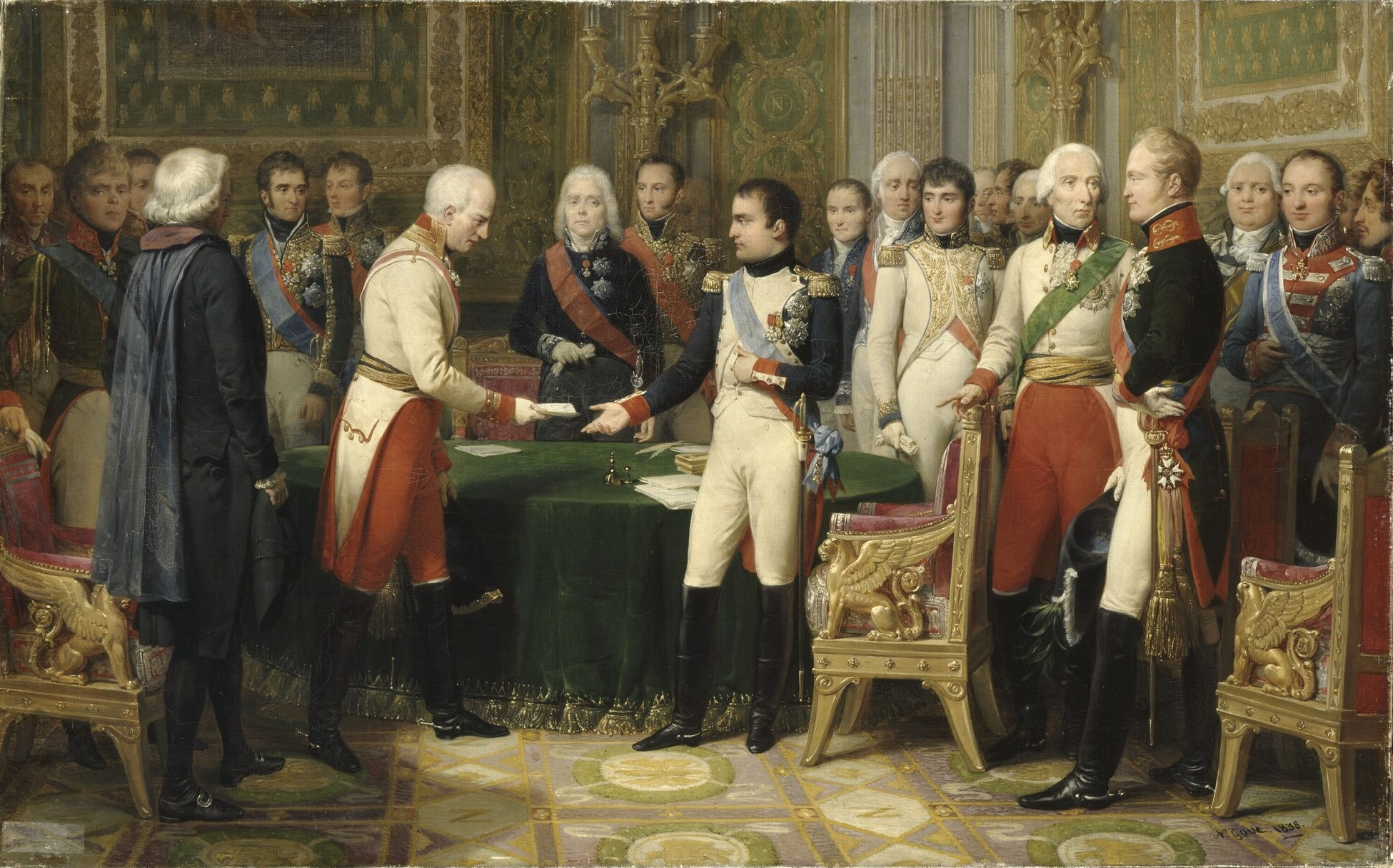
The Congress of Erfurt, 1838

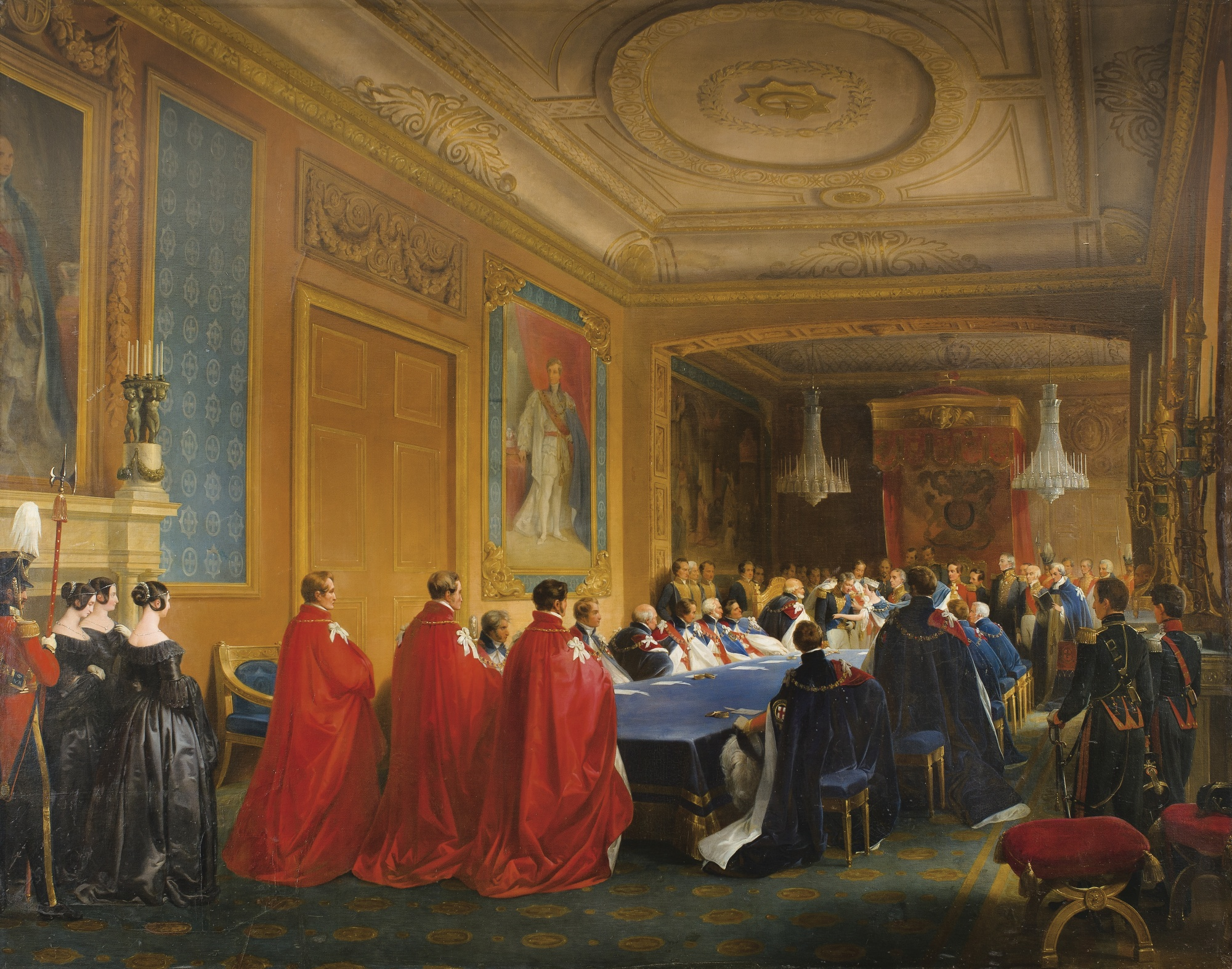
Louis Philippe Receiving the Order of the Garter, 1844

Napoleon III Visiting the Construction Site of the New Louvre, 1854

== Sources ==
- Gilman, D. C.; Peck, H. T.; Colby, F. M., eds. (1905). "Gosse, Nicolas Louis François" . New International Encyclopedia (1st ed.). New York: Dodd, Mead.
