= Hone (name) =

Hone is both a surname and a given name or nickname. As a given name, it is common in New Zealand; "Hōne" (also spelt "Hone") is the Māori transliteration of the name John.

Notable people with the name include:

== Surname ==
- Hone family
- Brian Hone (1907–1978), Australian headmaster
- Campbell Hone (1873–1967), Anglican bishop
- Danny Hone (born 1989), English footballer
- David Hone (born 1946), Australian Rules footballer, cricketer and headmaster in Victoria
- Evelyn Hone (1911–1979), British colonial administrator
- Evie Hone (1894–1955) Irish painter and stained glass artist
- Frank Sandland Hone (1871–1951), medical doctor in South Australia
- Galyon Hone, stained glass artist working for Henry VIII of England
- Garton Hone (1901–1991), South Australian cricketer and tennis player
- John Camillus Hone (1759–1836), English painter of miniatures
- Joseph Hone (1937–2016), British author
- Kate Hone, British psychologist and computer scientist
- Leland Hone (1853–1896), Irish cricketer
- Margaret Hone (1892–1969), English astrologer
- Mark Hone (born 1968), English footballer
- Nathaniel Hone the Elder (1718–1784), Irish painter
- Nathaniel Hone the Younger (1831–1917), Irish painter
- Nathaniel Hone (cricketer, born 1861), Irish cricketer
- Pat Hone (1886–1976), Irish cricketer
- Philip Hone, (1780–1851), Mayor of New York from 1826 to 1827
- Ralph Hone (1896–1992), British army officer, barrister and colonial administrator
- William Hone (1780–1842), English writer, satirist and bookseller
- William Hone (cricketer) (1842–1919), Irish cricketer

== First name ==
- Hone Glendinning (1912–1997), British cinematographer
- Hone Harawira (born 1955), New Zealand politician
- Hōne Heke (c. 1807–1850), Māori chief in New Zealand
- Hōne Heke Ngāpua (1869–1909), Māori and Liberal Party Member of Parliament in New Zealand
- Hone Heke Rankin (1896–1964), New Zealand tribal leader, medical worker, and farmer
- Hōne Taiapa (1912–1979), Māori master carver
- Hone Tuwhare (1922–2008), New Zealand poet of Māori ancestry

== Nickname ==
- Edward Tyne (1879–1959), New Zealand rugby footballer
