= Hone family =

Anglo-Irish family

The Hone family is an Anglo-Irish family dating back to the Cromwellian conquest of Ireland when Samuel Hone arrived with the Parliamentary army in 1649. The family is believed to be of Dutch extraction, although no connection to the Netherlands has yet been found.

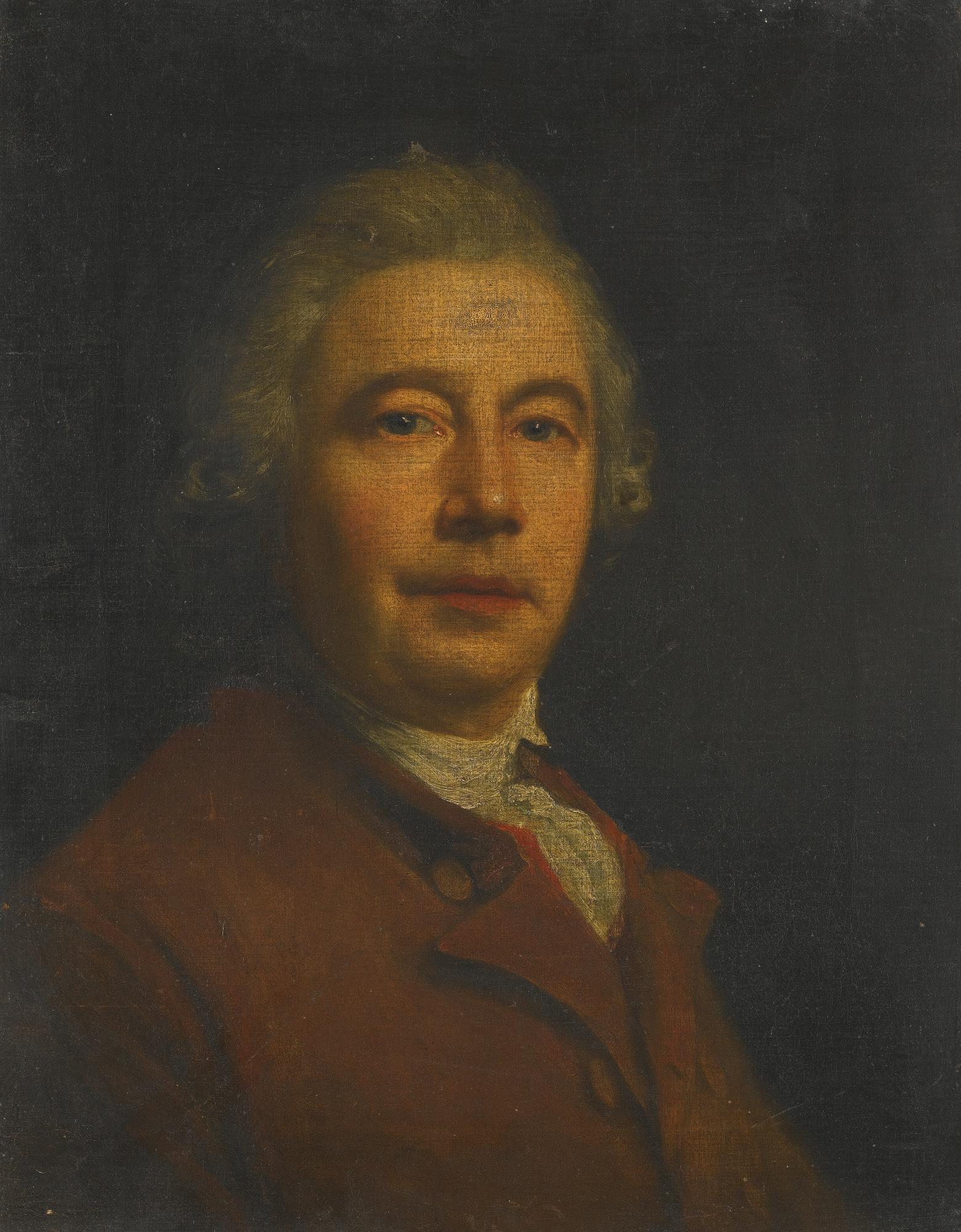
Nathaniel Hone the Elder (a self-portrait before 1784).

== History ==
Burke's Irish Family Records 1976 states that the Hones are of Welsh origin and that the name Hone is a variant of the name Owen. The earliest known ancestor of the Hones is Nathaniel Hone, living in 1632, who was a shoemaker in Marlborough. Nathaniel's second son, Samuel, went to Ireland with the Parliamentary army of Oliver Cromwell in 1649. In 1656, Samuel Hone was granted land near Carlow but he subsequently sold the land and established himself as a merchant in Wood Quay. Three of Samuel's grandsons are the ancestors of the various branches of the Hone family - namely Nathaniel Hone the Elder (1718-1784), Joseph Hone (1720-1799) and Brindley Hone (1734-1812), whose descendants often intermarried. The Hones, originally a merchant family, joined the ranks of the Anglo-Irish gentry in the early 19th century.

== Progenitors ==
=== Nathaniel Hone the Elder, RA (1718–1784) ===
Nathaniel Hone the Elder was the first Hone to enter the arts. He was notably one of the founder members of the Royal Academy in 1768. Nathaniel married Mary Earle, who has been described in varying sources as either the natural daughter of John Campbell, 4th Duke of Argyll or as a 'nobleman's mistress'. Nathaniel and Mary had 12 children in total, 2 of whom, Horace and John Camillus (the subjects of many of Hone's early paintings), became accomplished artists in their own right.

Horace Hone (1756-1825), a prominent society portrait miniature painter, was appointed an associate member of the Royal Academy in 1779. In 1795, Horace Hone was appointed miniature painter to the Prince of Wales, then the future George IV.

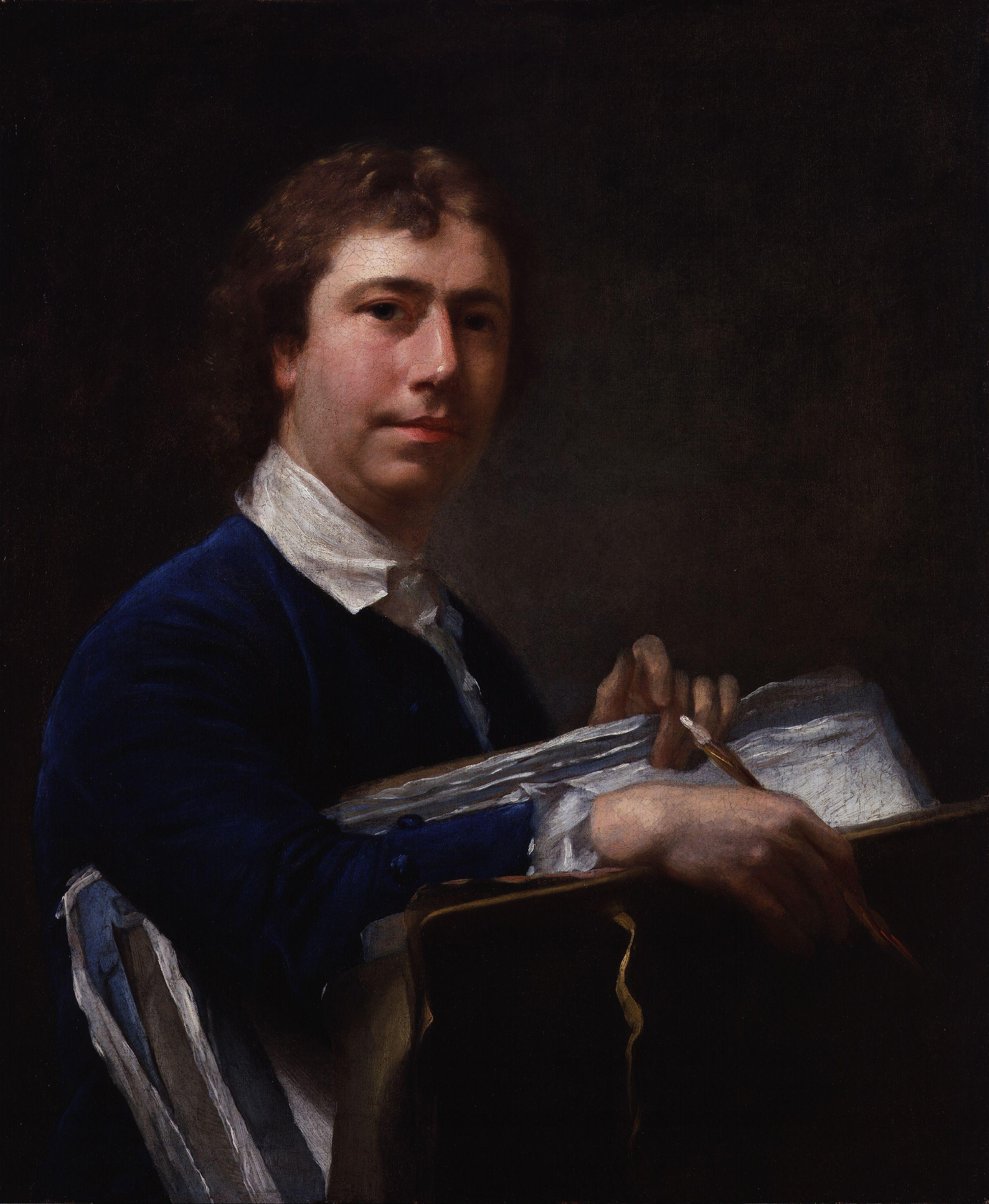
Nathaniel Hone the Elder (a self-portrait circa 1760).

John Camillus Hone (1759-1836), another of Nathaniel's sons, was also a portrait and miniature painter. John had a flourishing career as a painter with exhibitions at the Royal Academy from 1776 to 1780 before he went out to the East Indies to refine his art skills. John Camillus Hone returned to Dublin in 1790 and was appointed to the office 'Engraver of Dies' by the Lord-Lieutenant the Earl of Westmorland.

=== Joseph Hone (1720–1799) ===
Joseph Hone was a clothier in Dublin and a younger brother of Nathaniel Hone the Elder. He had two sons, Joseph (1747-1803) and Nathaniel (1758-1846), and a daughter Abigail (1752-1855) who married her first cousin John Camillus Hone (above). Nathaniel, Joseph's second son, had started life as a clothier but soon pursued a career in finance which culminated in his appointment as Governor of the Bank of Ireland in 1822. Joseph Hone, the elder son, had 9 children - 3 of whom had descendants: Joseph Hone (1775-1857), John Hone (1776-1836) and William Hone (1782-1859).

Joseph Hone (1775-1857) married Mary Crosthwaite, daughter of Leland Crosthwaite and Anne Maria Laban (whose mother was a Darby of the Leap Castle family), and had 10 children, having previously had 4 children with his first wife Elinor Maxwell. One of Joseph's daughters, Ann (1804-1896) married Brindley Hone (1796-1862), a grandson of Brindley Hone (1734-1812), and they had 13 children, including Nathaniel Hone the Younger (1831-1917). Brindley Hone (1796-1862) was the chairman of the Grand Canal Company as well as Director of the Bank of Ireland and had lived at Vevay House in Ballybrack which passed through the ownership of his many sons until it finally changed hands. Another of Joseph (1775-1857)'s sons was Nathaniel Hone (1807-1880), who served as Justice of the Peace and High Sheriff of County Dublin in 1870 and as Director of the Bank of Ireland. Nathaniel owned 1,687 acres of land in County Tipperary and built St Dolough's Park, which was later the residence of Nathaniel Hone the Younger.

John Hone (1776-1836) married Anne Crosthwaite, also a daughter of Leland Crosthwaite and Anne Maria Laban above. John and Anne had 16 children. The second son, Joseph Hone (1809-1872) was the father of 10 children including Charles Henry Hone (1866-1964) who lived at Tigh Lorcain Hall in Stillorgan. The descendants of John Hone (1776-1836) were largely clergy, civil servants and merchants around Dublin.

William Hone (1782-1859) married Lucy Crosthwaite, also a daughter of Leland Crosthwaite and Anne Maria Laban above. William and Lucy had 11 children. William was appointed President of the Dublin Chamber of Commerce aged 24 making him one of the youngest presidents. He lived at Annadale House in Clontarf, a house on 14 acres of land, and was a commercial broker of goods imported to Dublin. Of William's 11 children, two sons - Joseph (1804-1865) and Thomas (1817-1875) - and one daughter - Elizabeth (1809-1882) - had descendants who occupied prominent positions in society.

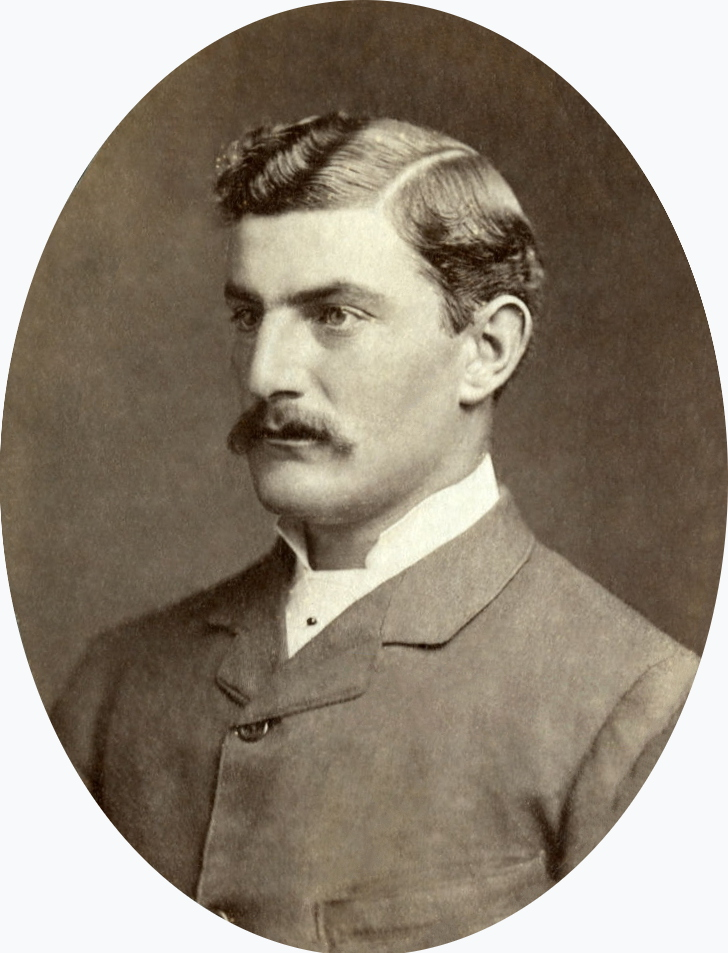
Leland Hone, great-grandson of Joseph Hone (1720-1799)

Elizabeth Hone (1809-1882), daughter of William Hone (1782-1859) and Lucy Crosthwaite, married Addison Hone (1797-1869), the grandson of Brindley Hone (1734-1812), and is covered in that section.

Joseph Hone (1804-1865) married Anna Browning, daughter of Jeffrey Browning and Frances Roche, and had 8 children. Three of Joseph's children were prominent cricketers: William Hone (1842-1919), Nathaniel Hone (1847-1929) and Leland Hone (1853-1896). Joseph's daughter Frances (1841-1912) married John Overington Blunden (1842-1915), son of Sir John Blunden, 3rd Baronet. William Hone (1842-1919), Joseph (1804-1865)'s eldest son, had 4 children including Joseph Maunsell Hone, the historian and biographer of W. B. Yeats. One of Joseph Maunsell Hone's grandchildren was Joseph Hone (1937-2016) the novelist, whilst another was Camillus Hone-Travers, the adopted son of Mary Poppins author P. L. Travers, whose life was the subject of much attention. Another son of William Hone (1842-1919) was William Patrick Hone (1886-1976), the father of the poet Leland Bardwell.

Another son of Joseph Hone (1804-1865) and Anna Browning was Joseph Hone (1850-1908) who was Governor of the Bank of Ireland and founder of maltsters H. Minch & Son Ltd . Joseph married Eva Eleanor Robinson, daughter of Sir Henry Robinson, and granddaughter of the 10th Viscount Valentia. They had 4 children, including the stained glass artist Evie Hone.

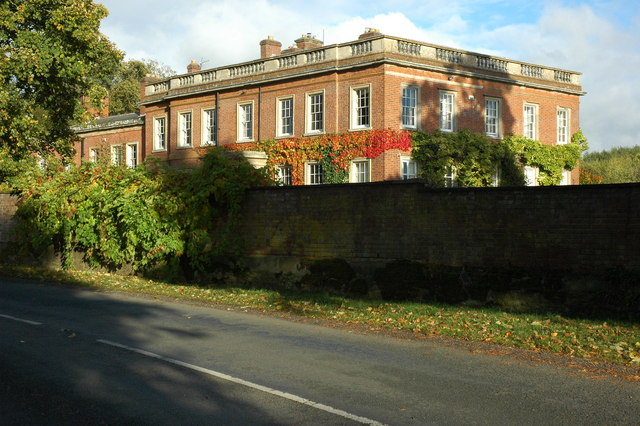
Bosbury House in Ledbury is still occupied by the Hones.

Thomas Hone (1817-1875) married Jane Browning, also a daughter of Jeffrey Browning and Frances Roche above, and had 8 children. Thomas Hone was a Director of the Bank of Ireland. Three of Thomas's sons were also prominent cricketers: William Hone Junior (1848-1888), Jeffery Hone (1850-1888) and Thomas Hone (1858-1922). Thomas Hone (1858-1922) played polo for Ireland in the 1888 International Polo Cup, and his son, also called Thomas Hone (1894-1946), moved to Bosbury House in Ledbury where the family still live.

=== Brindley Hone (1734–1812) ===
Brindley Hone (1734-1812) was a merchant at Usher's Quay in Dublin and a younger brother of Nathaniel Hone the Elder . Brindley married Sarah Strong, daughter of Rev. James Strong, and had 8 children. Brindley's second daughter, Sarah (1759-1809) married Rev. Robert Mahaffy and was the grandmother of Sir John Pentland Mahaffy. One of Brindley's younger daughters, Wilhelmina Dorothea (1768-1814) married Hickman Blayney Molesworth, and was the mother of Sir Robert Molesworth the noted judge. His youngest son, Addison (1773-1797) was the father of Brindley Hone (1796-1862), who married his cousin Ann Hone (1804-1896), and the grandfather of the landscape painter Nathaniel Hone the Younger (mentioned above with Brindley's descendants through this marriage). Brindley Hone's other two sons were Nathaniel Hone (1760-1819) and Joseph Terry Hone (1766-1831).

Nathaniel Hone (1760-1819) was High Sheriff of Dublin in 1798 and Lord Mayor of Dublin from 1810 to 1811. Nathaniel married Hannah Dickinson (1760-1841), having 6 children with her, and had a country house called Hannahville, which he named after his wife. Nathaniel's third son Addison Hone (1797-1869), who lived in Raheny, married Elizabeth Hone (daughter of William Hone and Lucy Crosthwaite above) and had 5 children. Addison's third daughter Mary Elizabeth (1852-1931) married George Vaughan Hart and had seven children. Addison's fourth daughter Nancy (1854-1938), known as Nannie, married Arthur D'Arcy Bellingham (1853-1903) and had a son, Arthur (1893-1969). Sir Henry Bellingham is the great-grandson of Nannie Hone and Arthur Bellingham.

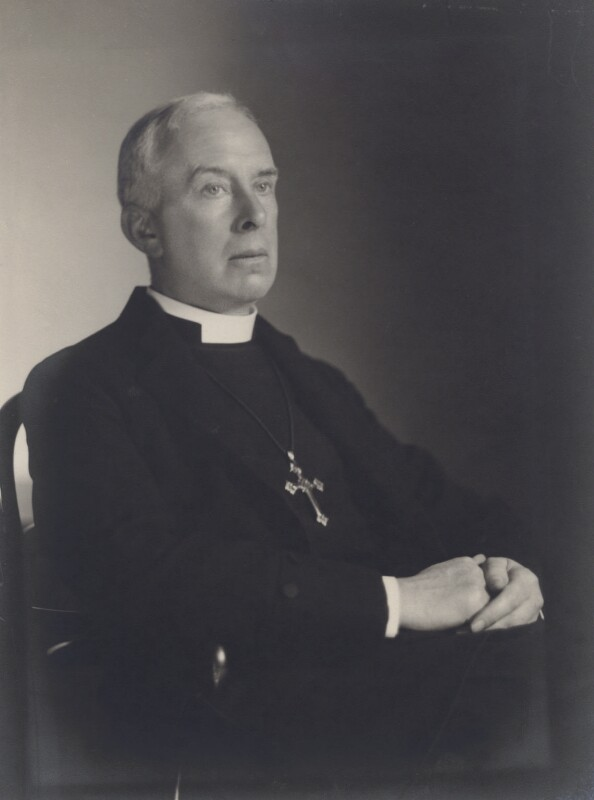
Right Reverend Campbell Hone

Joseph Terry Hone (1766-1831) lived in England and had 6 children. His second son was Richard Hone (1805-1881) who was an Anglican priest and author who had 8 children including Rev. Evelyn Hone (1837-1908), Warden of Hulme Hall (1870-74), who himself was the father of 10 children. Evelyn Hone was the father of Campbell Hone (1873-1967), an eminent Anglican bishop whose daughter Margaret was the mother of Sandy Bruce-Lockhart, Baron Bruce-Lockhart. Another of Rev. Evelyn Hone (1837-1908)'s children, Adeline (1909-2004), married John Russell, 3rd Baron Ampthill as his third wife and had two children. Sir Evelyn Hone, the last Governor of Northern Rhodesia, was a grandson of Rev. Evelyn Hone (1837-1908) through his father Arthur Rickman Hone (1880-1949).
