= William Hone (disambiguation) =

William Hone may refer to:

- William Hone (1780–1842), writer
- William Hone (cricketer) (1842–1919), Irish cricketer
  - Pat Hone (William Patrick Hone, 1886–1976), his son, an Irish cricketer
