= My Four Green Fields =

Stained glass window by Evie Hone

- Artist: Evie Hone
- Year: 1939
- Medium: Stained glass window
- Location: Government Buildings, Dublin, Ireland

My Four Green Fields, is a stained glass window by Irish artist Evie Hone. The window depicts the four provinces of Ireland and, though the composition is complex, emblems and symbols of the four provinces can be clearly seen. It was commissioned in 1939 by the Irish Government's Department of Industry and Commerce for the Irish Pavilion at the 1939 New York World's Fair. Later, from 1960 to about 1983 the window prominently featured at the Head Office of the Irish national transport company, Córas Iompair Éireann on O'Connell Street. The window was then taken into storage by Abbey Glass in Kilmainham, Dublin at the request of the Irish Office of Public Works.

In the 1980s, a decision was made to renovate Government Buildings in Dublin, the office of the Taoiseach. The window was completely renovated, including dismantling the work, cleaning each piece of glass individually and then releading. The window was fitted into its current position, the main window in the entrance hall of Government Buildings.

Since its installation at Government Buildings, the window, light streaming through it, has been the backdrop to many press conferences and meetings between Irish politicians and foreign dignitaries. The window formed the backdrop to Taoiseach Bertie Ahern's resignation speech in April 2008.

Concerning My Four Green Fields, the Tate Gallery in London has said:

The My Four Green Fields must always rank amongst [Evie Hone’s] most important [works], but it is notable that a feeling of new assurance entered into the features and disposition of the figures. It was almost as if the curvaceous and rounded line of the Byzantine world were added to the Northern Gothic style which the artist seemed to possess in common with the medieval craftsmen of Chartres and Poitiers.
