= Jacques Émile Édouard Brandon =

French painter (1831–1897)

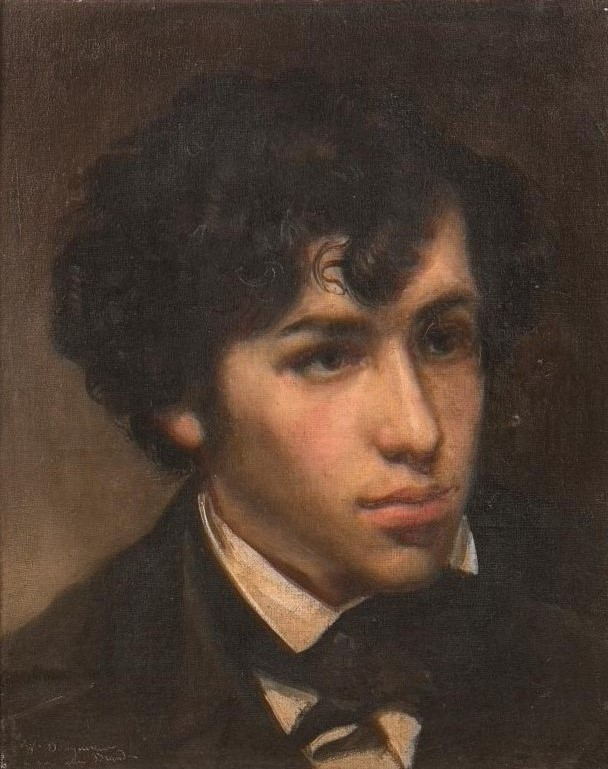
- William-Adolphe Bouguereau - Portrait of the painter Édouard Brandon, c.1855
- Born: July 3, 1831; Paris, France
- Died: May 20, 1897 (aged 65); Paris, France
- Education: Beaux-Arts de Paris

Signature
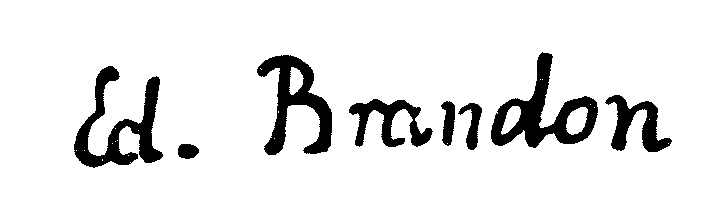

Jacques Émile Édouard Brandon (July 3, 1831 – May 20, 1897) was a French artist who is known especially for his paintings of Jewish themes. Most sources list his place of birth as Paris, although some say Bordeaux or Lisbon. He signed his paintings "Ed. Brandon", and his full name commonly is given as Jacques Émile Édouard Brandon, but also as Jacob Émile Édouard Péreira Brandon.

== Biography ==
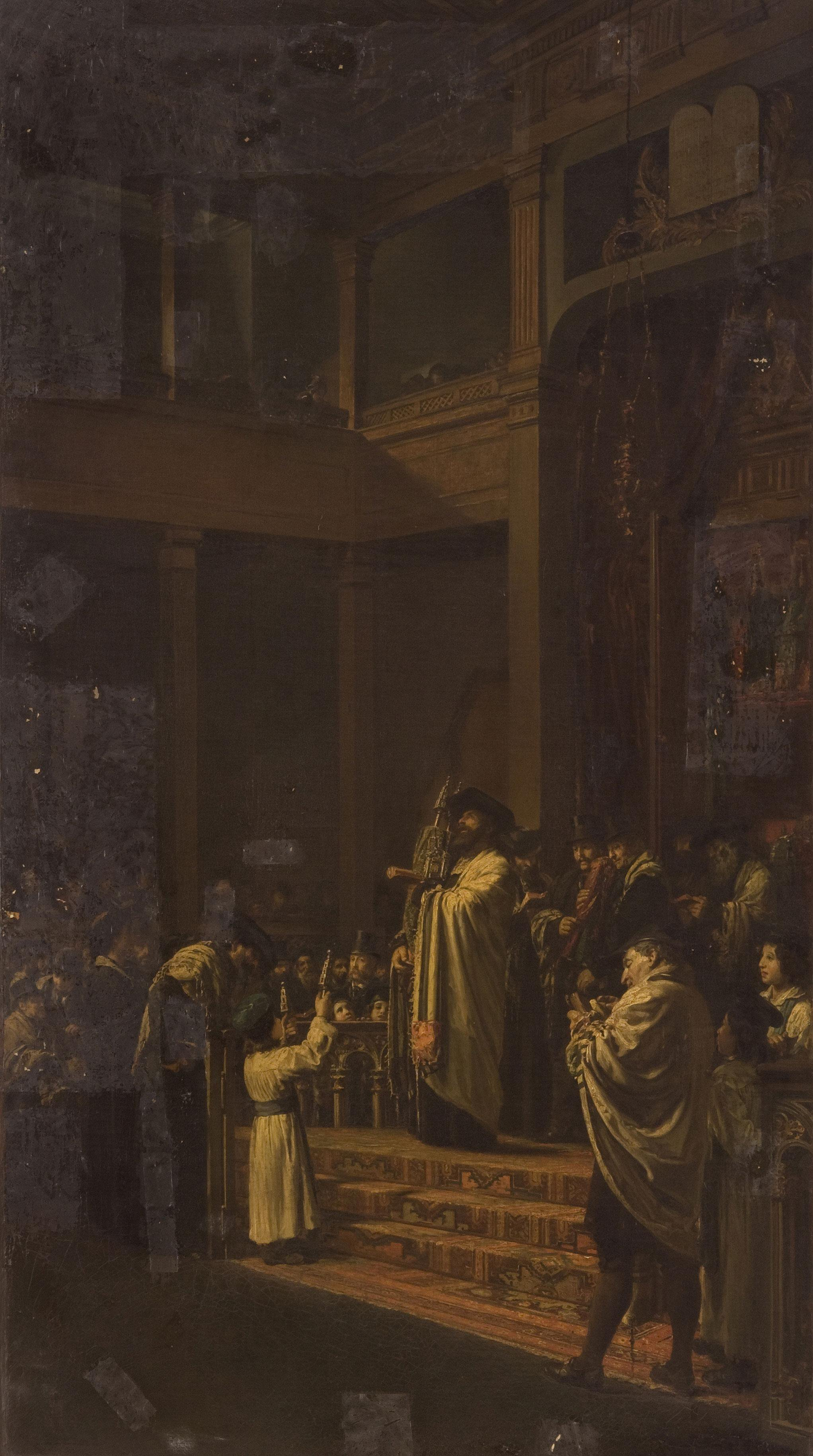
Scene in a Synagogue, 1868-1870

Brandon was born on July 3, 1831, in Paris. His father was Elie Péreira-Brandon, a wealthy Parisian financier, although some sources list him as an art dealer. He entered the Beaux-Arts de Paris in Paris on April 5, 1849, and was a student of Antoine-Alphonse Montfort, Françoise-Édouard Picot and Jean-Baptiste-Camille Corot. Brandon and Corot corresponded frequently and remained close throughout Corot's life.

In 1856, Brandon went to Rome, where he lived until 1863. While there he became acquainted with Edgar Degas, and in later years they collected each other's works. During his time in Rome his artistic focus was at the church of Santa Brigida on the Piazza Farnese. He decorated a room in which St. Bridget of Sweden (1303–1373) had lived, embellishing it with a variety of paintings and other artworks. Some of these were exhibited at the Parisian Salons during the 1860s, including The Canonization of St. Bridget in 1861 and The Last Mass of St. Bridget in 1863. He won medals at the Salon in 1865 and 1867.

Brandon was of Sephardic Jewish heritage, and after his return to Paris in 1863 his subject matter shifted largely to Jewish themes. Many of his later paintings featured rabbis and synagogues; one example is Scene in a Synagogue (1868–1870), now in the collection of the Philadelphia Museum of Art. At Degas' invitation, Brandon displayed five paintings in the 1874 show that later became known as the First Impressionist Exhibition. Three of the works that Degas entered in that exhibit were owned by Brandon.

In Paris, Brandon worked closely with Irish artist Nathaniel Hone the Younger, who stayed with Brandon at 44, rue du Notre Dame de Lorette. Others studying under him included Edmond Borchard (1848–1922), Georges de Dramard (1839–1900), Ludovic-Anatole Glaizot (1842–1903), Alexis Lemaistre (1853–?), Léon Martin, Mlle Clémentine Antoinette Pepin, Charles-Baptiste Schreiber (1845–1903), Henri Rouart, who was a close friend of Degas, and William Sartain (1843–1924). Rouart's collection was sold at the Hôtel Drouot on April 21–22, 1913, and included a work entitled "Portrait du peintre Brandon" by William Adolphe Bouguereau. It was signed and dedicated "à son ami Brandon", and dates to 1857; its whereabouts are unknown.

In 1890, Brandon exhibited 17 pictures at the Champ de Mars Salon in Paris. Other participants in that show were Puvis de Chavannes, Max Liebermann, and John Singer Sargent.

Brandon died in Paris on May 20, 1897. His personal collection of 176 artworks, including paintings by Corot and Jean-Auguste-Dominque Ingres, was sold on December 13–14, 1897 at the Hôtel Drouot. Léon Roger-Milès (1859–1928) purchased a number of works, some of which are now at the Musée d'Art et d'Histoire du Judaïsme in Paris.

Works by Brandon are held today at the Spertus Institute for Jewish Learning and Leadership in Chicago, the Jewish Museum in New York, the Philadelphia Museum of Art, the Walters Art Museum in Baltimore, MD; The Boston Museum of Fine Arts; the National Portrait Gallery in London; the National Gallery of Ireland in Dublin; the Musée des Beaux-Arts de Brest in Brest, France; the Palais des Beaux-Arts de Lille in Lille, France; the Musée départemental de l'Oise in Beauvais, France; the Musée d'Art et d'Histoire du Judaïsme in Paris; the Koninklijk Museum voor Schone Kunsten in Antwerp, Belgium; the Musée Juif de Belgique in Brussels, Belgium; and the Tel Aviv Museum of Art.
