= Joseph Maunsel Hone =

Joseph Maunsell Hone (1882 – 26 March 1959) was an Irish writer, literary historian, critic and biographer of George Moore and W. B. Yeats. He was one of the notable group of writers associated with the literary and theatre movement in Ireland in the early 20th century.

== Life ==
Hone was the son of William Hone, of Killiney, County Dublin, of the Hone family, and Sarah Cooper of Limerick. He was educated at Wellington School and Jesus College, Cambridge. While still at college he participated in setting up the publishing company of Maunsel & Co., along with Stephen Gwynn and George Roberts. He founded the firm's quarterly, The Shanachie, at his own expense.

In 1909 he went to Persia, then in ferment, with Page Lawrence Dickinson and in 1910 wrote his first book, Persia in Revolution, describing their experiences there. The following year he translated Daniel Halévy's Life of Nietzsche, with an introduction by Tom Kettle. He continued to translate the works of French and Italian writers and contributed to periodicals. His first book on Yeats, William Butler Yeats: The Poet in Contemporary Ireland, was published as one of Maunsel's Irishmen of Today series in 1915. Later books included Bishop Berkeley (1931), The Life of George Moore (1936), and The Moores of Moore Hall in 1939.

Joseph Hone, the novelist, was his grandson.
