= Santa Brigida, Rome =

Santa Brigida
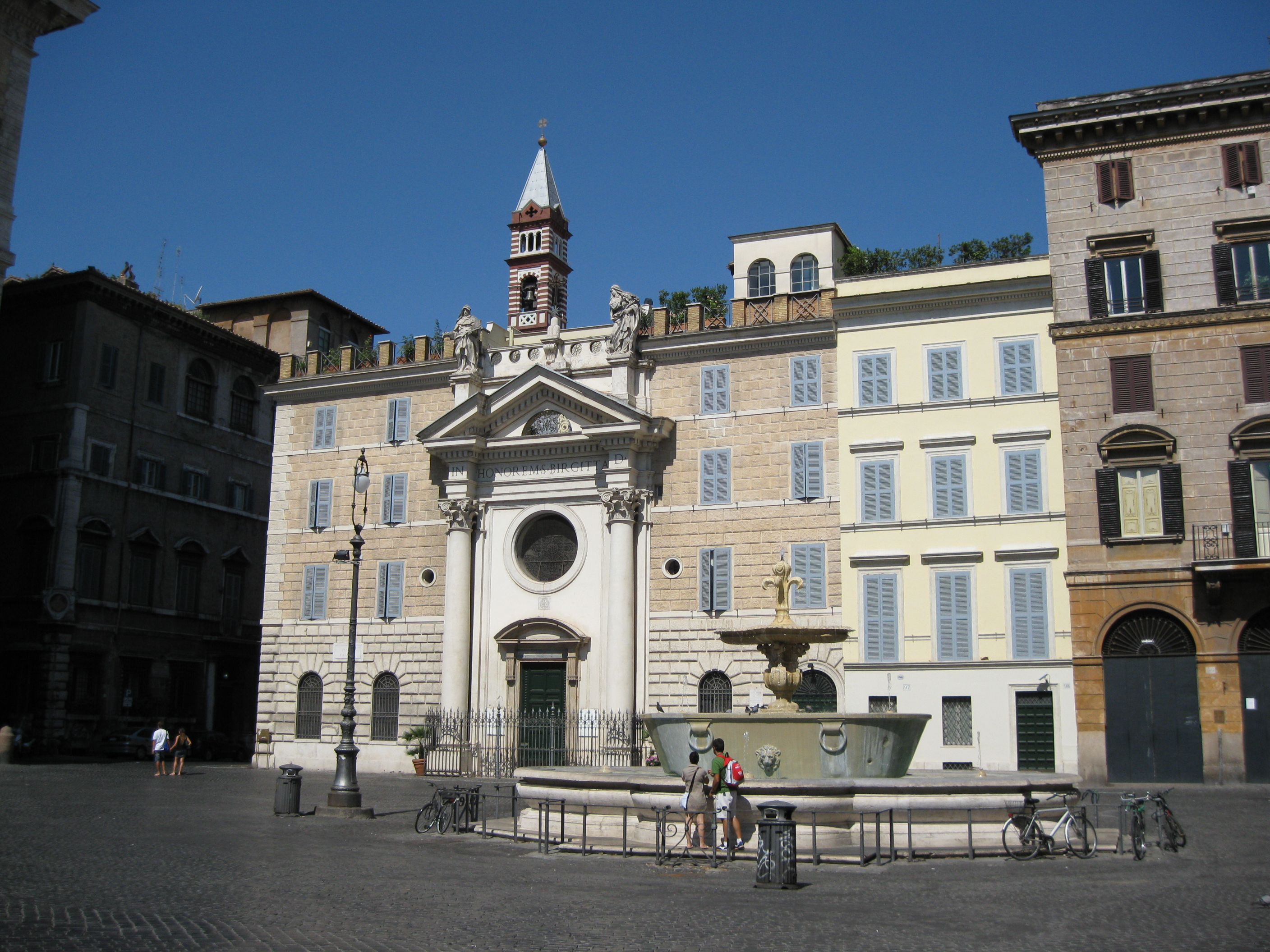
- The facade of Santa Brigida on Piazza Farnese
- Click on the map for a fullscreen view
- 41°53′43″N 12°28′15″E
- Location: 96 Piazza Farnese; 00186 Roma
- Country: Italy
- Denomination: Catholic
- Tradition: Latin Church
- Religious order: Bridgettines
- Website: www.brigidine.org

History
- Status: General Motherhouse of the Bridgettine Order, Swedish national church
- Dedication: St Bridget of Sweden

Architecture
- Architect: Raffaele Ingami (additions)
- Years built: 1513, restored in 18th century

Santa Brigida is a convent church dedicated to St Bridget of Sweden and the Swedish national church in Rome. It was also known as Santa Brigida a Campo de' Fiori since it was built on what was then part of Campo de' Fiori but is now the urbanistically distinct Piazza Farnese.

== History ==
A first building rose during the pontificate of Boniface IX (1389–1404) but was later abandoned. In 1513, Peder Månsson, later (1524) Bishop of Västerås in Sweden, erected a new church. It was officially granted to the Bishop of Uppsala by Pope Paul III (1534–1549).

It was restored in the early 18th century by Pope Clement XI (1700–1721).

In 1828, Pope Leo XII gave the convent and church to the Canons of Santa Maria in Trastevere. They did not have the means to restore it, and gave it to the Congregation of Holy Cross, a French congregation, in 1855. They restored the church and the rooms of St Bridget in 1857–1858.

The next owner was a Polish branch of the Carmelite Order, to whom the convent and church was given in 1889. They held it until 1930, when it was returned to the Bridgittine Order.

The paintings in the church were restored before the Bridgittine jubilee of 1991.

== Exterior ==
The façade was constructed in 1705 and adorned with statues of St Brigid and her daughter St Catherine by Andrea Fucigna. Minor changes, such as the shapes of the windows, were made in the 19th century.

The design of the neo-romanesque bell-tower, added in 1894, is attributed to the architect Raffaele Ingami who carried out much consolidation work for the convent at the time.

== Interior ==
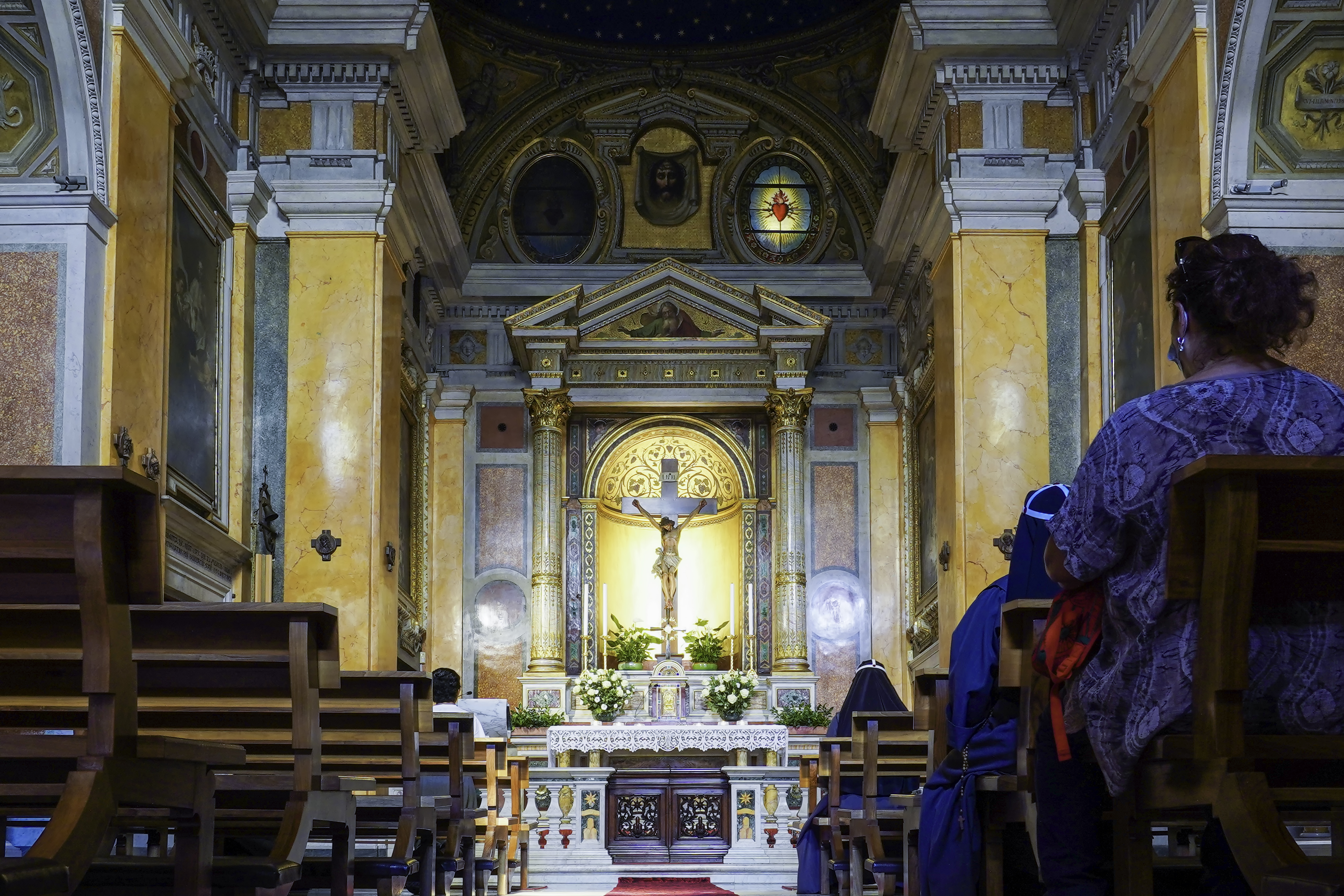

There are two marble holy water fonts. On the right-hand one may be seen the lily of the Farnese family, placed here when Cardinal Odoardo Farnese was the protector of the convent, 1601–1626. The one on the left side has the arms of the Carmelite Order. Another protector was Cardinal Virginio Orsini whose coat of arms can be seen on a marble bowl in the sacristy.

In the early 18th century the church was embellished with six paintings Scenes from the Life of St Bridget by Biagio Puccini, executed between 1702 and 1705. Circa 1709–1711, Puccini also painted the large ceiling fresco. In its centre is The Glory of St Bridget which is clearly influenced by the large marble relief of The Glory of St Catherine of Siena by Melchiorre Cafà from the 1660s.

There are three recently discovered memorial plaques in the church. They are not in their original positions. Two of them, one by the entrance to the Chapel of St Richard and one by the sacristy door, must have been in Bridget's room, and the third was probably placed on the façade until the new church was built in the 16th century.

=== Chapel of St Richard ===
Near the entrance are two doors. One leads to the Chapel of St Richard, the other to the new sacristy (1894). The chapel was built in 1894 on Neo-Gothic style by Raffaele Ingami. It is dedicated to an English Bridgettine monk, Richard Reynolds, who was martyred in London in 1535. He is considered the most important martyr of the order. The chapel was originally dedicated to Our Lady of Sorrows, and an inscription from this period has been preserved on the altar. On the walls are eight paintings of scenes from the life of the Blessed Virgin, made by Eugenio Cisterna.

On the right-hand side is the cenotaph of Nils Karlsson Bielke (died 1765) by Tommaso Righi. He was a descendant of one of St Bridget's brothers. After converting to Catholicism he lived in exile in Rome, and was made a senator. His place of burial is unknown.

Also on the right-hand side is the Altar of Our Lady. The painting by Virginio Monti, depicting Mary and the Holy Child in a classical landscape scene, was made in the 19th century. It is a copy of a lost original by Annibale Carracci.

Opposite this altar is the Altar of St Catherine of Sweden. It was redecorated in 1894. The painting, made in that year, is by Eugenio Cisterna, a pupil of Virginio Monti. It originally depicted St Bridget and St Teresa of Avila, but when the church was given to the Bridgettine Sisters in 1930, the figure of St Teresa was altered to represent St Catherine.

=== Chapel of St Catherine ===
In the crypt is the Chapel of St Catherine, which was dedicated in 1972. It has 70 seats, and is used by the Church of Sweden. Lutheran services are held on Sundays and Thursdays.

== Convent ==
The church is part of the convent of the Bridgettine Sisters. The convent building was owned by Francesca Papazurri, who became a close friend of St Bridget during the Holy Year of 1350. It was at that time known as the Palatium Magnum, The Grand Palace. Bridget lived there for 19 years, and her rooms have been preserved. After Bridget's death, the house was donated to the order's mother house in Vadstena, and it was used as a hospice for Swedish pilgrims and clergy visiting Rome.

In the 16th century, the Reformation brought radical changes. The convent became a refuge for Swedish Catholics who chose exile rather than conversion. Among those who lived here in this period was Johannes Magnus (1488–1544), the last Catholic Archbishop of Sweden. Olaus Magnus arrived in 1549, and set up a printing press in the house. He published the revelations of St Bridget from this press in 1557. As the mother house in Vadstena was suppressed, a cardinal was made protector of the convent. During her exile from 1673 until her death in 1689, Queen Christina of Sweden was its protectress.

The building was restored by Pope Clement XI (1700–1721). Since then, only minor changes have been made to the exterior.

It is possible to visit the rooms of St Bridget and her daughter St Catherine, first abbess of the Bridgettine Sisters. The rooms contain relics of the two saints, and are decorated with paintings from the lives of the saints. Jewish artist Édouard Brandon is responsible for the artworks in the room of St Bridget. Chapels of St Bridget and St Catherine have been installed in their respective rooms.
