= Frank Sandland Hone =

(1871–1951) medical practitioner

Dr. Frank Sandland Hone (1871 – 9 May 1951) was a medical doctor in South Australia, a specialist in the treatment of cancers and a lecturer at the University of Adelaide. He was the father of two prominent medical doctors and a leading educator, who all excelled at sports.

== History ==
Hone was born in Mount Gambier, the son of (Baptist) Rev. Nathaniel Johnson Hone (died 1909) and his wife Emily Hone, née Sandland (died 1914) who married in 1869. He was educated at Prince Alfred College, where he excelled at sports and academic subjects. He studied medicine at the University of Adelaide, and graduated MB and ChB in 1894, winning the Everard Scholarship.

Dr. Hone had his first practice in Morphett Vale, where he was appointed medical officer to aborigines and the destitute poor, and from 1903 in Semaphore, then established a specialist clinic in Adelaide in 1919. He was an honorary physician at the Royal Adelaide Hospital from 1921 to 1931 and was later an honorary consulting physician for many years. He was for many years a lecturer at the Adelaide Medical School, where he was highly regarded and popular.

Around 1910 he was appointed chief Commonwealth Quarantine Officer for South Australia, an onerous position before antibiotics when plague, smallpox and tuberculosis were serious threats to the community, and isolation in sanatoria was society's chief weapon. In 1924 there was only one pathology laboratory in the State, which meant long delays in the diagnosis of infectious diseases in country areas. He established new facilities in Port Pirie, Mount Gambier and Renmark. He resigned this position in 1929, owing to the pressure of his private practice, and the position was made full-time, with Dr. F. N. Ponsford the first appointee.

He was interested in preventive medicine, and was involved in research into typhus disease, which was endemic among grain workers. In 1924 he was a member of the Commonwealth Royal Commission on Public Health, part of whose terms of reference was the division of responsibilities between Commonwealth and States. Most of the Commission's recommendations were introduced into Australian public health practice.

Hone died after two weeks in intensive care in a Wakefield Street private hospital. Prior to this, he was said to be the oldest practising graduate of the Adelaide Medical School.

== Other interests ==
- He was a fine tennis player, taking the South Australian Lawn Tennis Association doubles championship in 1891, and was runner-up in the singles the same year.
- He was a trustee of the SA Lawn Tennis Association and for many years chairman of the South Australian Amateur Football League.
- He was an active member of the Crippled Children's Association and a foundation Fellow of the Royal Australasian College of Physicians.
- He was for 12 years chairman of the Adelaide University anti cancer organisation, which in 1950 through the Lord Mayor's Cancer Fund raised £108,000, which was spent on new equipment for diagnosis and treatment.
- He was a member of Adelaide University Council for 19 years, and was largely responsible for the decision to concentrate departments of the Adelaide Medical School in the new seven-storey building in Frome road.
- He was president of the Baptist Union in 1935 and served for some years as chairman of the Church's home mission committee.

== Recognition ==
Dr. Hone was invested CMG in 1941.

== Family ==
Nathaniel Johnson Hone ( – 23 July 1909) married Emily Sandland ( – 25 October 1914) on 22 October 1869

- Frank Sandland Hone (1871 – 9 May 1951) married Lucy Henderson ( – 1951) on 6 May 1896

- Dr. Frank Raymond Hone (1897–1963)
- Ronald Bertram Hone (1899–1968) was married to married Effie Jessie Hone
- Dr. Garton Maxwell Hone (1901–1991), cricketer and tennis player, was married to Alison Romanis Hone, divorced 1946
- Brian William Hone (1 July 1907 – 28 May 1978), headmaster of the Melbourne Church of England Grammar School

- David Jeremy Hone (born 30 June 1946), cricketer and VFL footballer

- Githa Joyce Hone (1908–1971) married Colin Percival Detmold ( – ) in 1938
- (Winifred) Ruth Selwyn Hone (1911– ) married Dr. Richard Alfred Angas Pellew (1911–1976) in 1937/1938. He was head of the Adelaide Children's Hospital.
