= Evie Hone =

Irish artist

- Painting of Evie Hone by Hilda van Stockum
- Born: Eva Sydney Hone; 22 April 1894; Roebuck Grove House, Donnybrook, County Dublin, Ireland
- Died: 13 March 1955 (aged 60); Rathfarnham, County Dublin, Ireland
- Education: Byam Shaw School of Art; Central School of Arts and Crafts; Westminster School of Art; André Lhote; Albert Gleizes
- Known for: stained glass

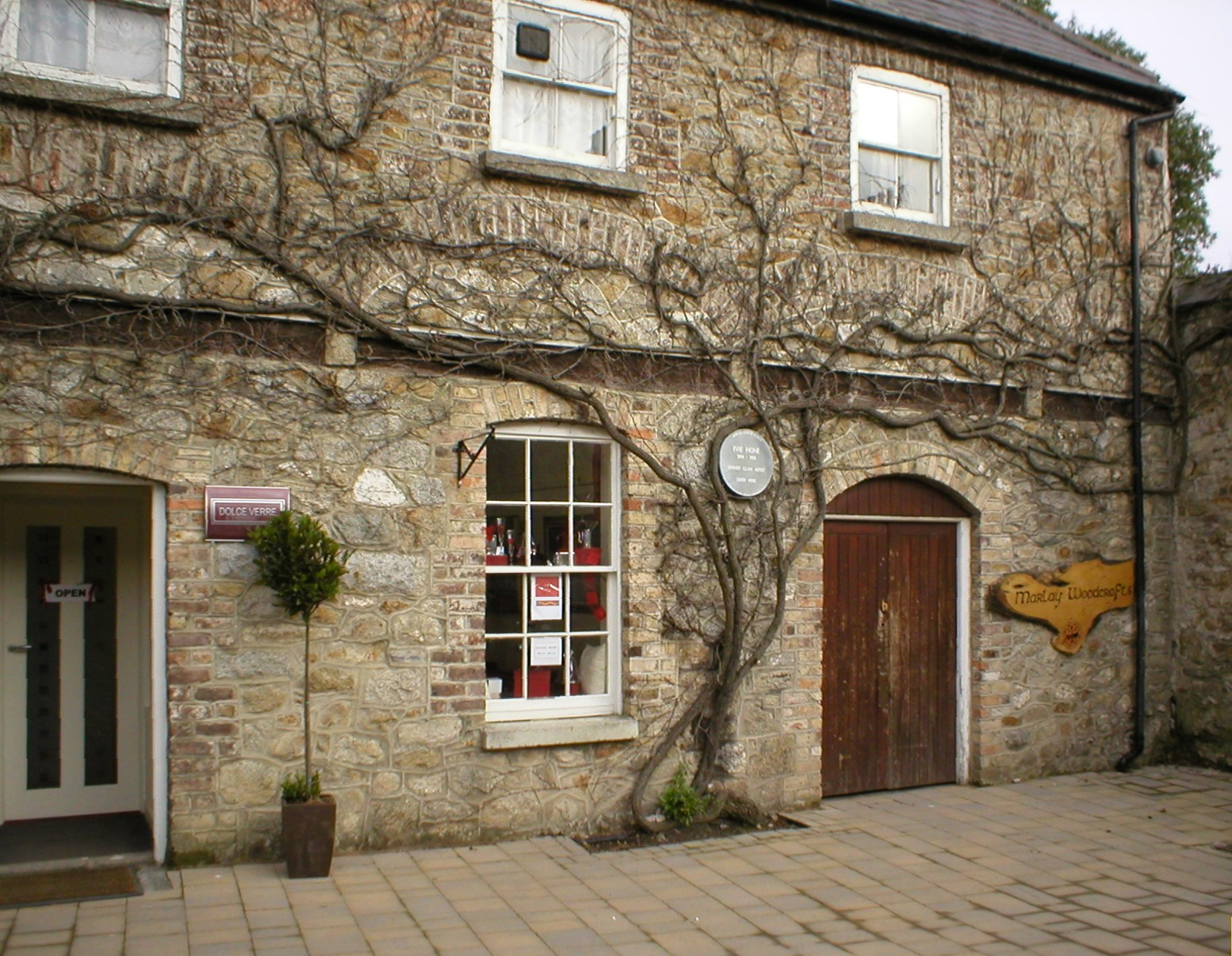
Site of Rathfarnham workshop, Marlay Park courtyard

Eva Sydney Hone RHA (22 April 1894 – 13 March 1955), usually known as Evie, was an Irish painter and stained glass artist. She is considered to be an early pioneer of cubism, although her best known works are stained glass. Her most notable pieces are the East Window in the Chapel at Eton College, which depicts the Crucifixion, and My Four Green Fields, which is now in the Government Buildings in Dublin.

== Early life ==
Eva Sydney Hone, known as Evie, was born at Roebuck Grove, Donnybrook, County Dublin, on 22 April 1894. She was the youngest daughter of Joseph Hone, of the Hone family, and Eva Eleanor, née Robinson, daughter of Sir Henry Robinson and granddaughter of the 10th Viscount Valentia. Her mother died two days after her birth. She was related to artists Nathaniel Hone and Nathaniel Hone the Younger.

Shortly before her twelfth birthday she suffered from polio (infant paralysis), suffering a fall whilst helping to decorate the church in Taney for Easter. Her resulting ill health led to her seeking treatment in Harley Street. She was educated by a governess, continuing her education in Switzerland, and went on tours to Spain and Italy before moving to London in 1913. Her three sisters all married British army officers, and all were widowed in the First World War.

== Training ==
Hone studied at the Byam Shaw School of Art in London and then under Bernard Meninsky at the Central School of Arts and Crafts. She met Mainie Jellett when both were studying under Walter Sickert at the Westminster Technical Institute. She worked under André Lhote and Albert Gleizes in Paris before returning to become influential in the modern movement in Ireland and become one of the founders of the Irish Exhibition of Living Art. She is considered an early pioneer of Cubism but in the 1930s turned to stained glass, which she studied with Wilhelmina Geddes.

== Notable works ==
Her most important works are probably the East Window, depicting the Crucifixion, for the Chapel at Eton College, Windsor (1949–1952) and My Four Green Fields, now located in Government Buildings, Dublin.This latter work, commissioned for the Irish Government's Pavilion, won first prize for stained glass in the 1939 New York World's Fair. It graced CIÉ's Head Office in O'Connell Street from 1960 to about 1983. The East Window of Eton College was commissioned following the destruction of the building after a bomb was dropped in 1940 on the school during the Second World War. The artist was commissioned to design the East Window in 1949, and the new window was inserted in 1952. This work featured on an Irish postage stamp in 1969. From December 2005 to June 2006, an exhibition of her work was on display at the National Gallery of Ireland. Saint Mary's church in Clonsilla also features her stained glass windows.

== Personal life ==
Hone was extremely devout; she spent time in an Anglican Convent in 1925 at Truro in Cornwall and converted to Catholicism in 1937. This may have influenced her decision to begin working in stained glass. Initially she worked as a member of the An Túr Gloine stained glass co-operative before setting up a studio of her own in Rathfarnham.

== Works ==
- All Hallows College College Chapel south stained glass window.
- The Crawford Art Gallery, Cork.
- The East Window - Eton College Chapel, Windsor.
- My Four Green Fields - Government Buildings, Dublin.
- Frontage including arms of provinces - Dublin Bus, O'Connell Street, Dublin.
- Lanercost Priory, Cumbria.
- Manresa House, Dublin
- Trinity College Dublin
- East Window, St Mary's Church, Downe, Bromley, Kent.
- The Hugh Lane Municipal Gallery
- Highlanes Gallery Drogheda, County Louth.
- Catholic Church in Tullabeg, County Offaly: a series of five windows, 1946.
- Church of the Immaculate Conception, Kingscourt, County Cavan. Four windows, 1947-8.
- St Mura’s Parish Church, Fahan, County Donegal: Memorial window for Mrs W. A. Dickson, depicting Elizabeth of Hungary, 1949.
- St. Peter and Paul's Church Kiltullagh, County Galway. Stations of the Cross.
- Church of the Immaculate Conception, Farm Street, London. Rose window in facade and Assumption window, 1953.
- St Michael's, Highgate, London. Stained glass window of The Last Supper dating from 1954.
- Shirley Chapel at Ettington Park, Warwickshire.
- St. John the Baptist, Blackrock, Dublin. Stained glass windows by Evie Hone in 1955.
- SS Michael and John's Roman Catholic Church, Cloughjordan, County Tipperary. Two small windows to the side of the altar.
- Holy Family RC Church, Ardara, County Donegal. Rose window.
- Mount Carmel Hospital, Churchtown, Dublin. Reception area.
- Healing Grace of Christ, stained glass window, Washington National Cathedral, Washington, D.C., 1953
- Works as part of the Cuala Press Collection at Library of Trinity College Dublin.
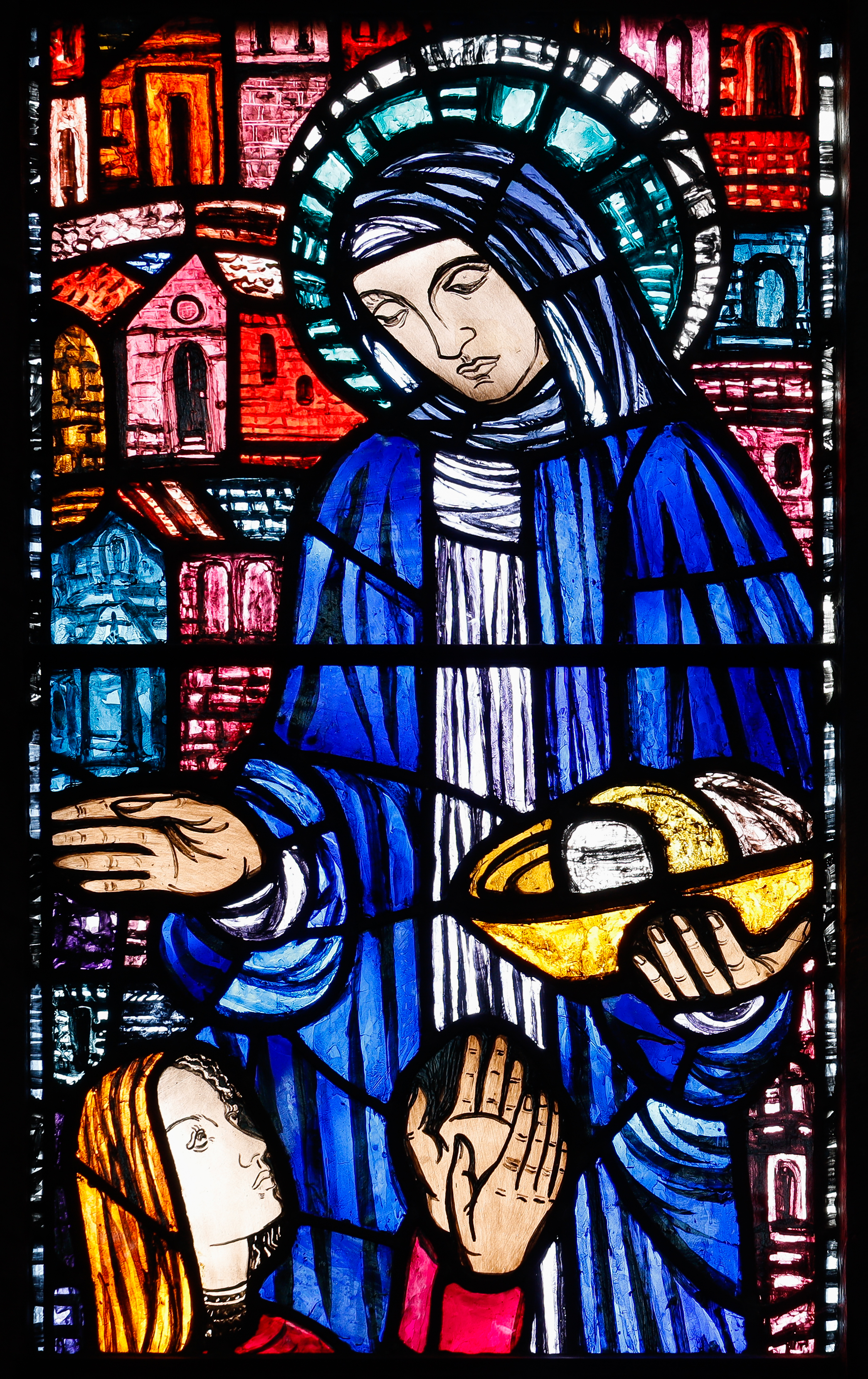
St. Brigid at St. Brendan's Cathedral, Loughrea (detail)

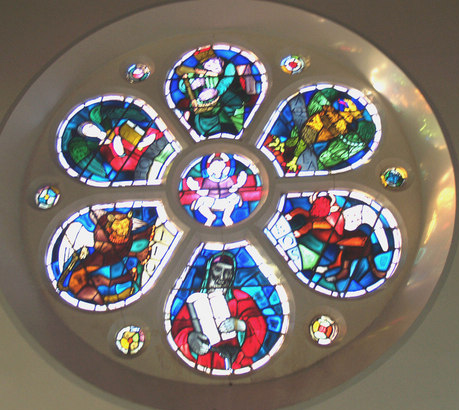
Rose window, Ardara

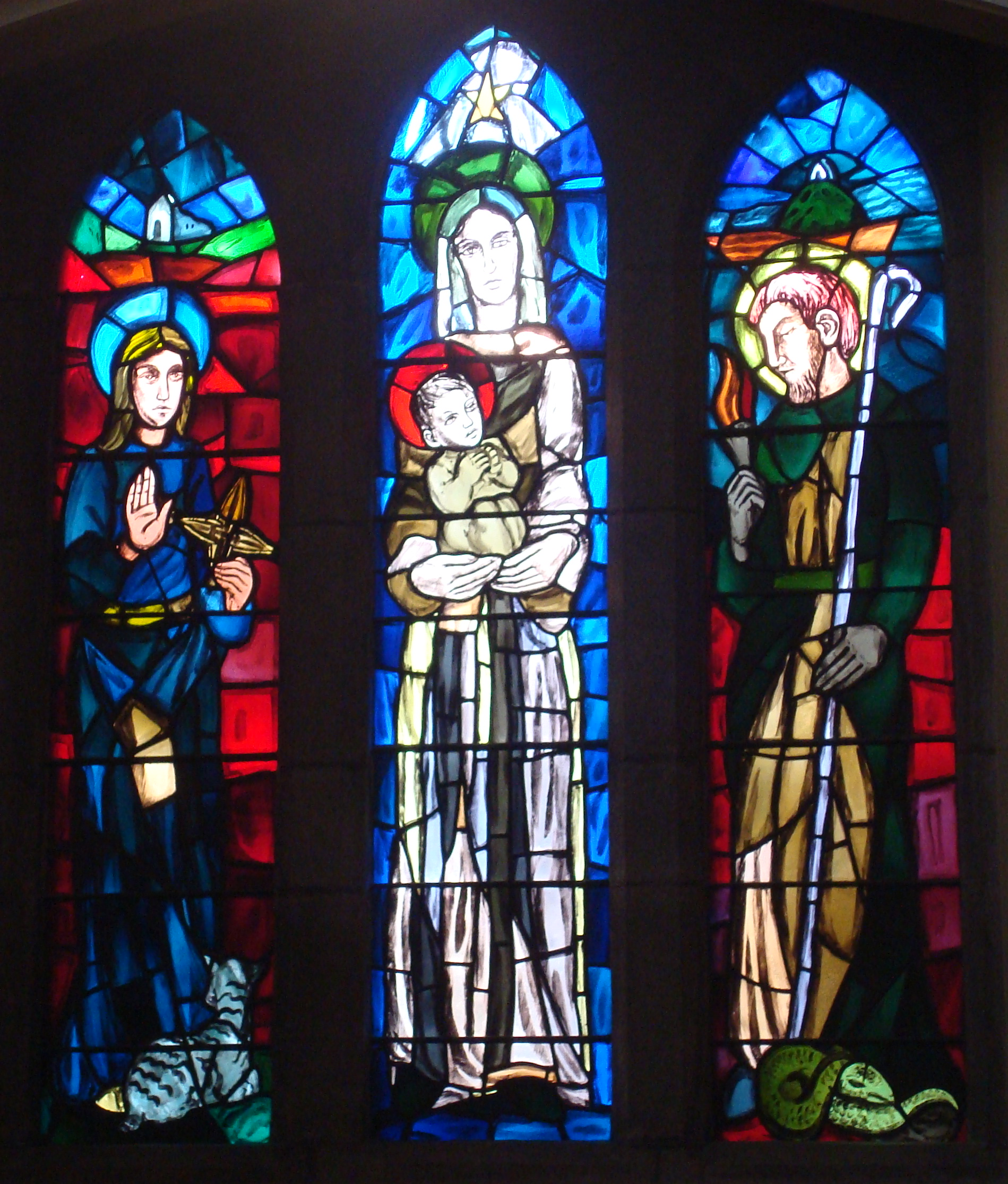
In St. John the Baptist, Blackrock (1955)

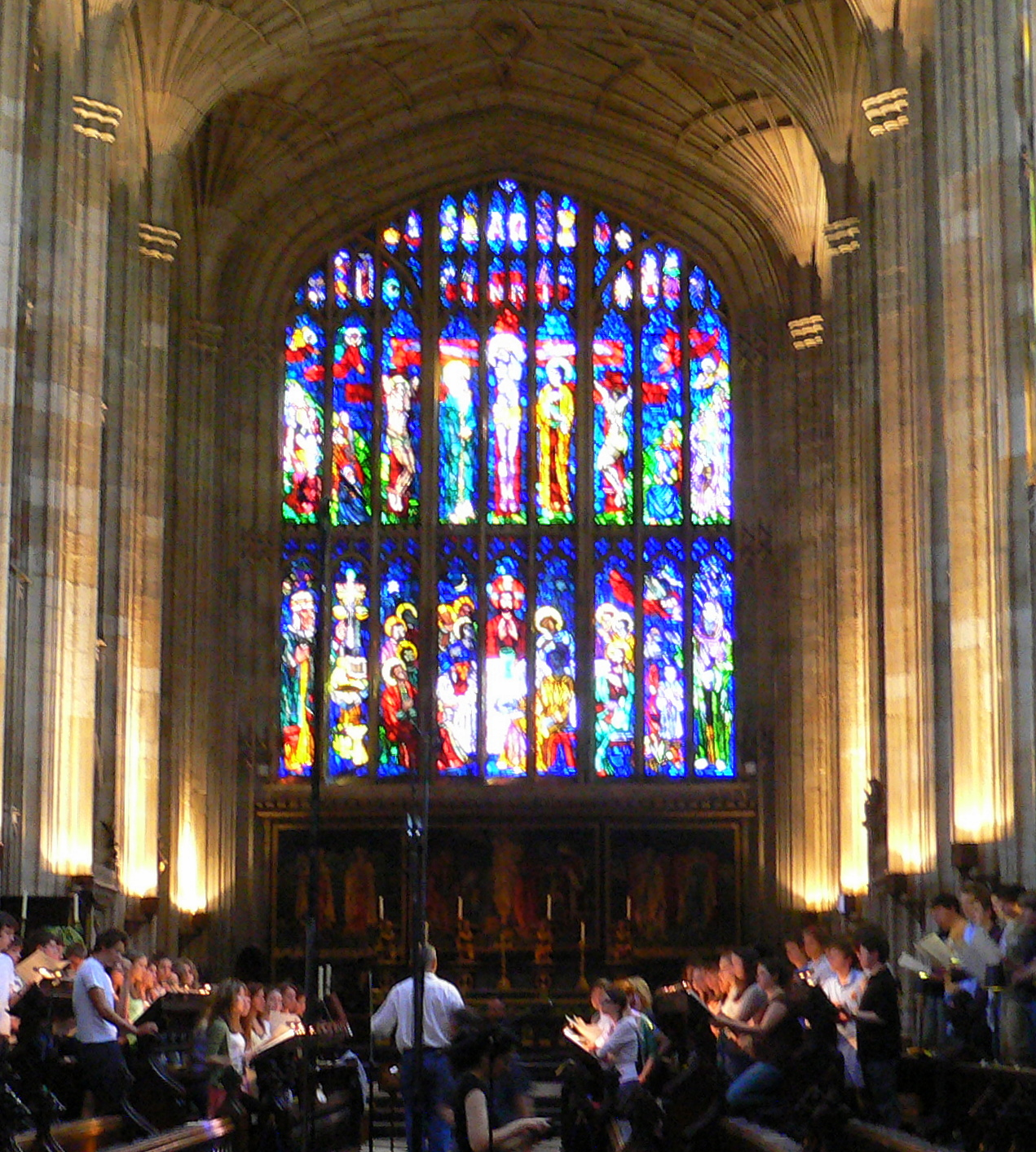
East window, Eton College Chapel
