= Government Buildings =

Headquarters of the Government of Ireland

- Tithe an Rialtais
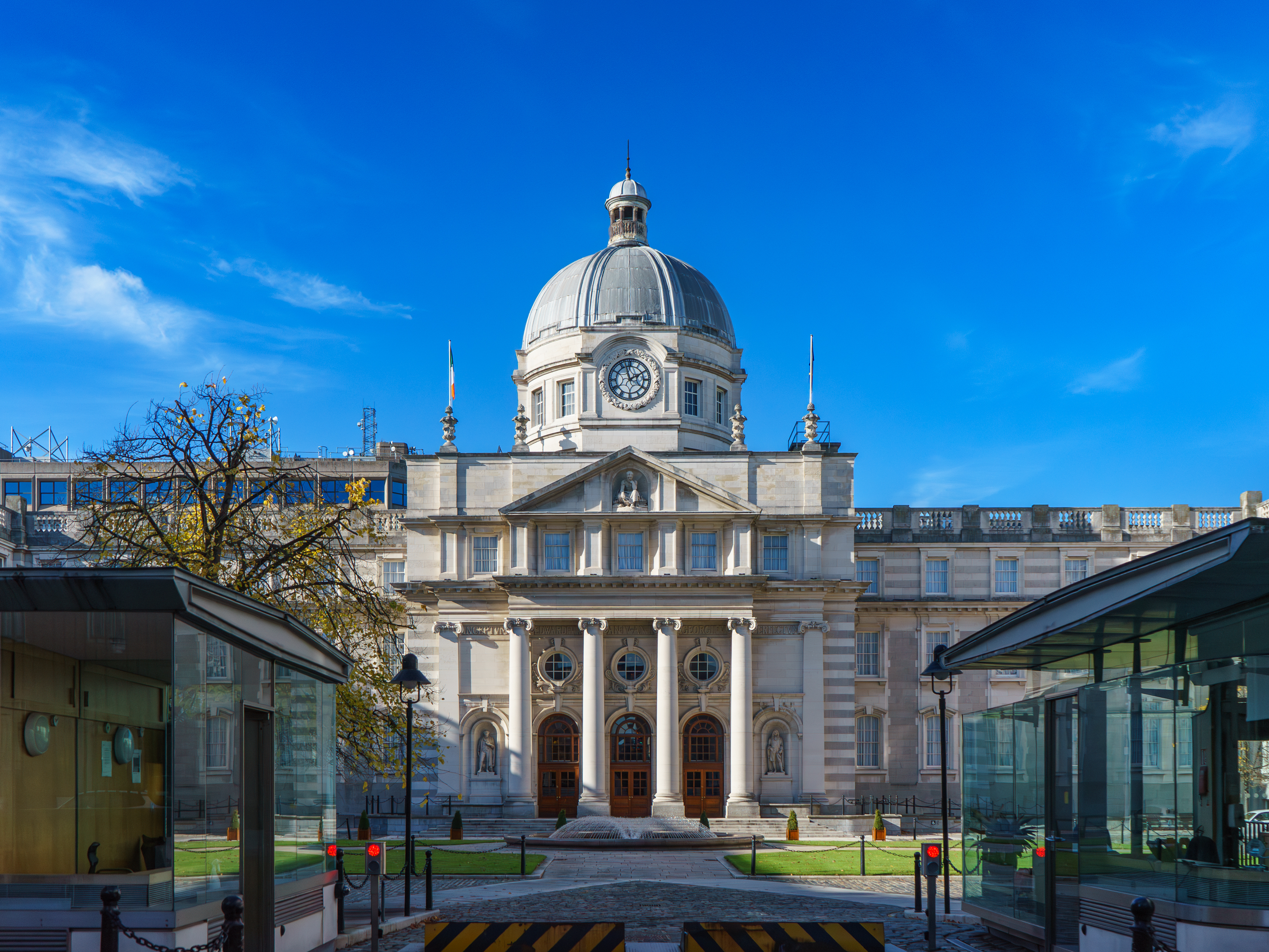
- Main façade of Government Buildings

- Location within Central Dublin

General information
- Architectural style: Edwardian Baroque, neoclassical
- Location: Merrion Street, Dublin, Ireland
- Coordinates: 53.339167°N 6.253611°W
- Current tenants: Department of the Taoiseach, Office of the Attorney General, Department of Finance, Cabinet Office, Department of Public Expenditure, Infrastructure, Public Service Reform and Digitalisation,
- Construction started: 1904
- Completed: 1922
- Inaugurated: 1911
- Renovated: 1989–1990
- Cost: £225,000 pounds sterling (1904 est.)
- Renovation cost: £17.4 million Irish pounds (1990)
- Owner: Government of Ireland

Technical details
- Material: Portland stone faced and Wicklow granite

Design and construction
- Architect: Sir Aston Webb
- Main contractor: McLaughlin & Harvey Ltd

Renovating team
- Architect: Office of Public Works
- Renovating firm: Pierse Contracting
- Awards: RIAI Silver Medal for Conservation (1987–92)

Government Buildings (Irish: Tithe an Rialtais) is a large Edwardian building enclosing a quadrangle on Merrion Street in Dublin, Ireland, in which several key offices of the Government of Ireland are located. Among the offices of State located in the building are:

- Department of the Taoiseach
- Council Chamber (cabinet room)
- Office of the Attorney General
- Department of Finance
- Department of Public Expenditure, Infrastructure, Public Service Reform and Digitalisation

== Origins ==
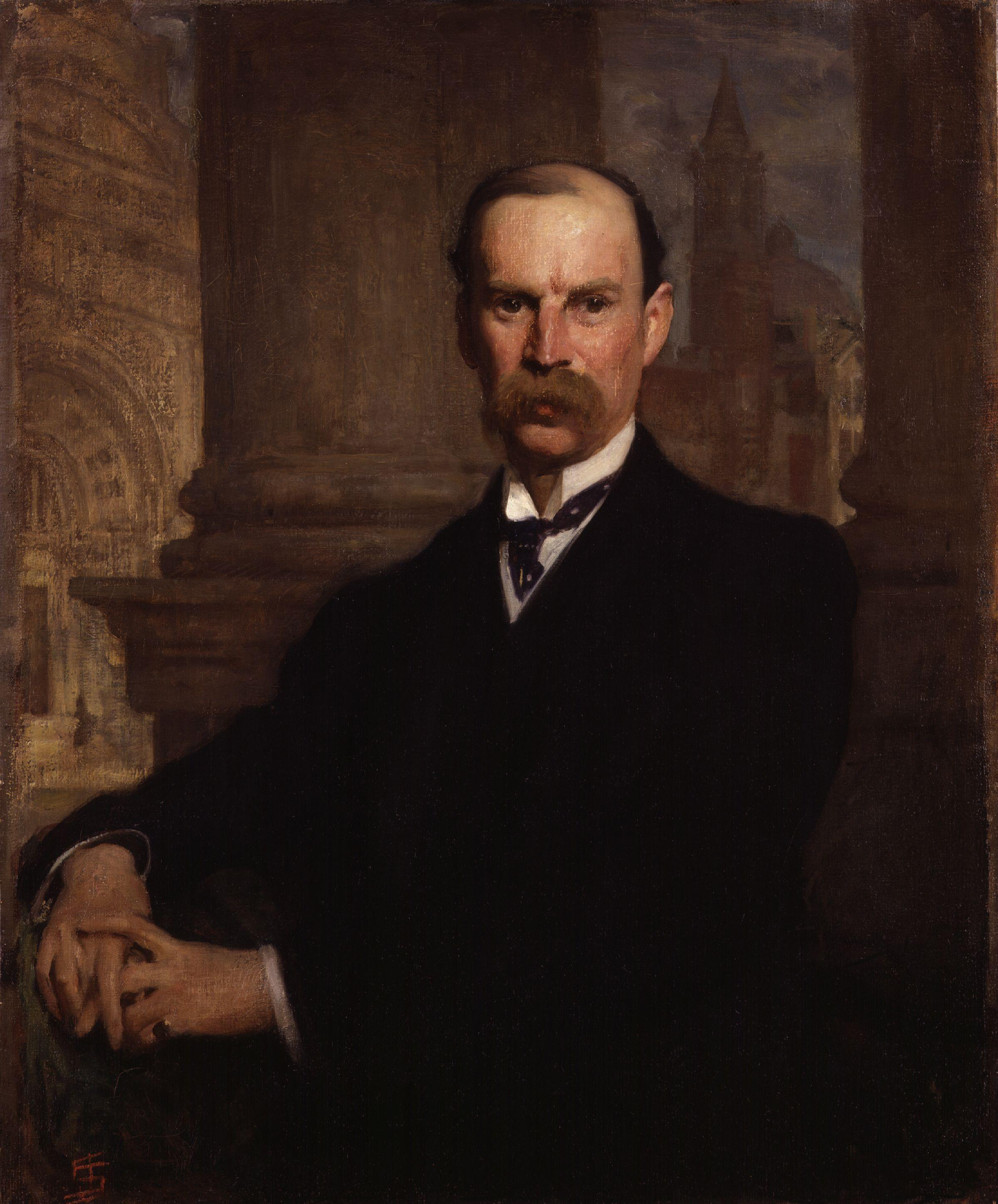
Sir Aston Webb, architect of the new Royal College of Science

The building that was to become Government Buildings was the last major public building constructed under British rule in what is now the Republic of Ireland. It was designed by Sir Aston Webb, a British architect who was later to redesign the façade of Buckingham Palace, and was built on the site of a row of Georgian houses that were being controversially demolished one by one as it was erected. The foundation stone was laid by Edward VII in 1904, and the building was opened by George V in 1911.

It was owned by the Department of Agriculture and Technical Instruction, an agency of the Dublin Castle administration, and intended for use by the Royal College of Science. In June 1921, the Council Room was chosen as the location for the first meeting of the new Parliament of Southern Ireland, created under the Government of Ireland Act 1920. It proved a fiasco, as only 4 of 128 members of the House of Commons turned up, and 15 of the 64 Senators.

With the coming into existence of the Irish Free State in December 1922, Leinster House, the headquarters of the Royal Dublin Society, located next door to the Royal College of Science, became the provisional seat of the Free State's parliament, Oireachtas of the Irish Free State. The Executive Council of the Irish Free State immediately commandeered part of the college as temporary office space. Two years later, the Free State decided to buy Leinster House outright from the RDS. Government usage of part of the Royal College of Science also became permanent.

=== Original government buildings (1922–1991) ===
From 1922 to 1991, the former Royal College of Science building was divided between a number of bodies. The wing to the right of the main entrance (the north wing) was used by the Department of the President, later in 1937 renamed the Department of the Taoiseach. The Attorney General, the Department of Justice and other offices also occupied that wing of the building. The south wing was occupied permanently by the Department of Finance. The centre block of the courtyard under the dome was still used by the Royal College of Science, and later when it merged with University College Dublin, by students from the Faculty of Engineering. Over the decades, some departments moved out to purpose-built offices, leaving the north wing for the Taoiseach, Government Secretariat and Attorney General.

== Current Government Buildings ==
In the mid-1980s, increasingly unhappy at the cramped office space, Taoiseach Garret FitzGerald decided to convert the entire building for government use. This policy was implemented by his successor, Charles Haughey, who had the state sell a block of Georgian houses across the road, which up to then had been in state ownership, for £17 million to fund the rebuild. A new engineering faculty was also built on University College Dublin's Belfield campus, costing tens of millions of pounds.

Much of the original interior of the original building was gutted to facilitate the creation of a state-of-the-art new government office. Haughey finally moved into the new building in 1991. Critics of the expenditure, at a time when the Republic of Ireland was in financial difficulties, nicknamed the building the Chaz Mahal. However, criticism of the redesigned building soon died away and it won major architectural awards for its design, with world leaders like British Prime Minister John Major praising it to Taoiseach Albert Reynolds when he visited the building. The entrance hall is dominated by light streaming through Evie Hone's critically acclaimed stained glass window, My Four Green Fields.

The new building included a state-of-the-art suite of offices for the Taoiseach and staff, a set of committee rooms, new offices, canteen facilities, a helicopter pad and a new press briefing room. Originally the Office of Public Works had planned a new cabinet suite of rooms also. However, the Government opted to continue to use the Council Chamber which had been the cabinet room for all Irish governments since 1922.

Government Buildings are protected by the Garda Síochána and an armed company from the Military Police Corps.

== Gallery ==
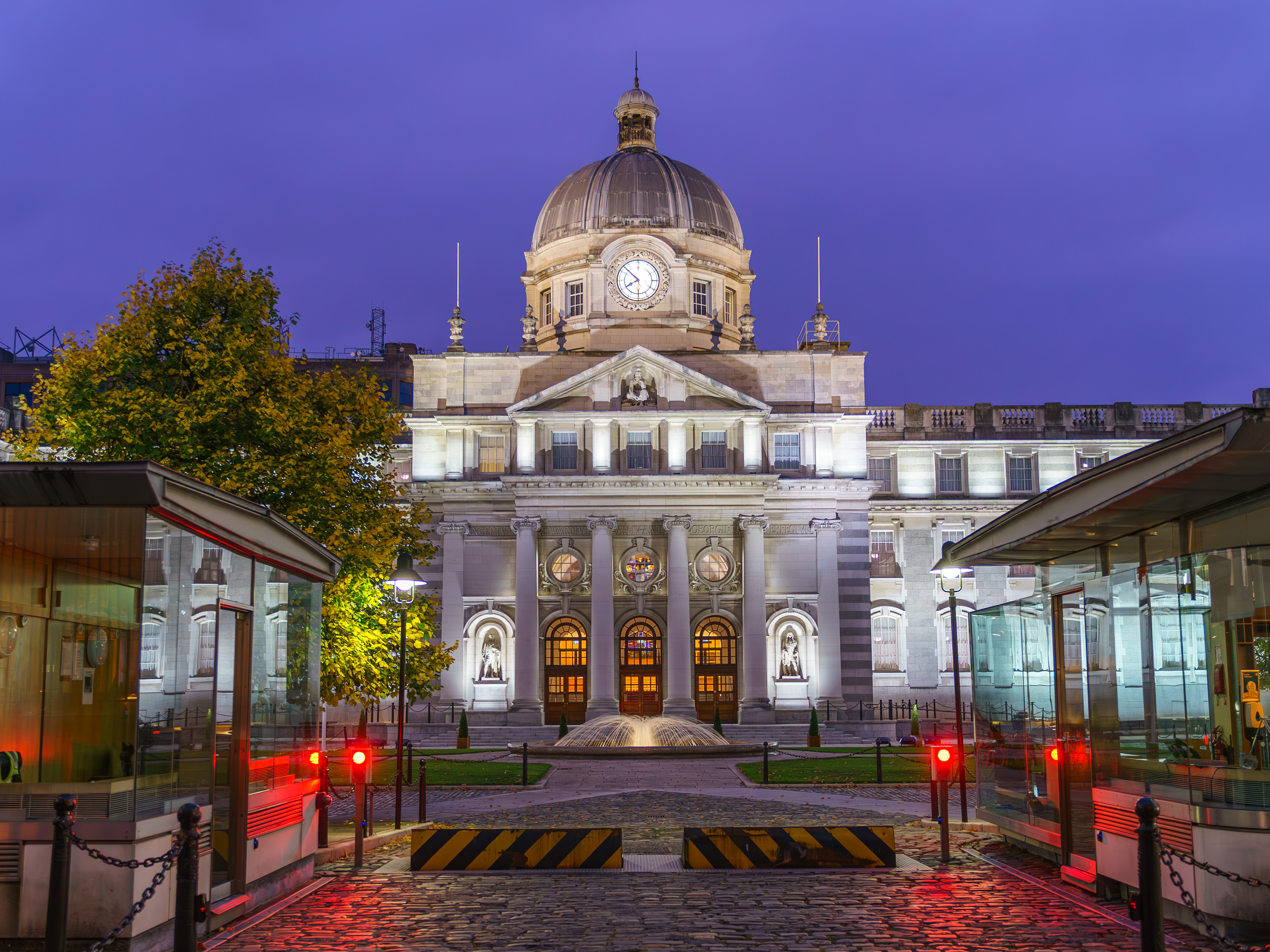
Government Buildings façade in the evening.

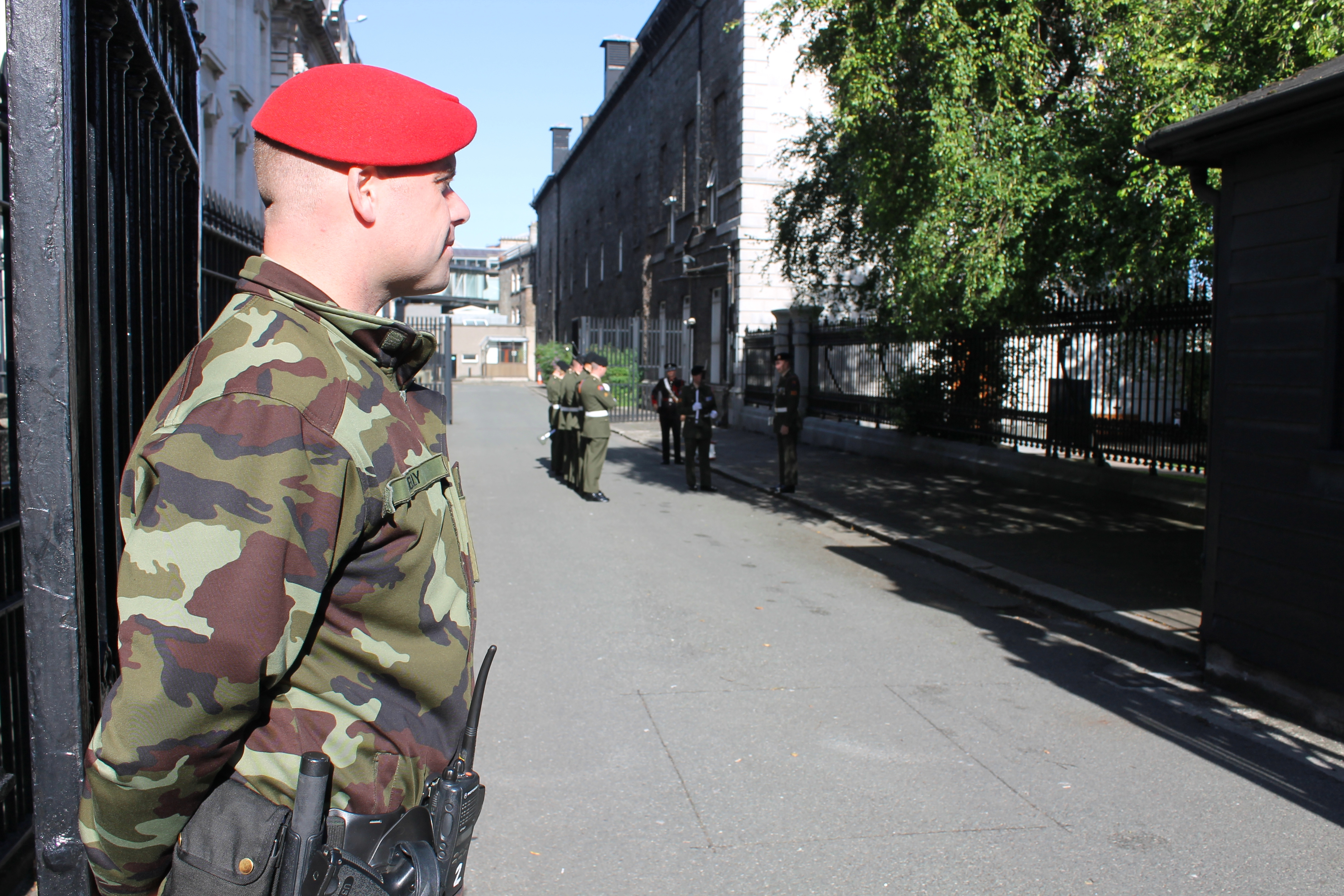
An armed Military Police soldier on duty at Government Buildings
