= Horace Hone =

English painter

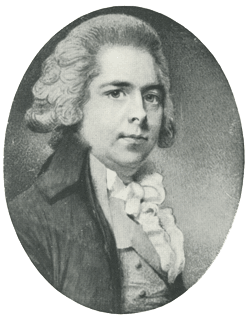
- Self portrait
- Born: 11 February 1754; Frith Street, London, England
- Died: 25 May 1825 (aged 71); London

Horace Hone (11 February 1754 – 25 May 1825) was an English painter of miniatures.

== Life and family ==
Horace Hone was born in 1754 in Frith Street, London. His parents were Nathaniel and Mary Hone (née Earle) of York, England. His father was a miniaturist who gave Hone his initial training. He was their eldest son of 10 children, 5 of whom survived to adulthood. Hone's brother, John Camillus, was also an artist. Hone entered the Royal Academy school on 9 October 1770, when his age was given as "17 Feb 11th next". He first exhibited with the Royal Academy in 1772, and in 1779 was elected an associate.

Hone married Sophia Dapper and had one daughter, Mary Sophia Matilda. She died on 28 February 1832, unmarried. A small portrait of her engraved by J. Mannin survives.

== Career ==
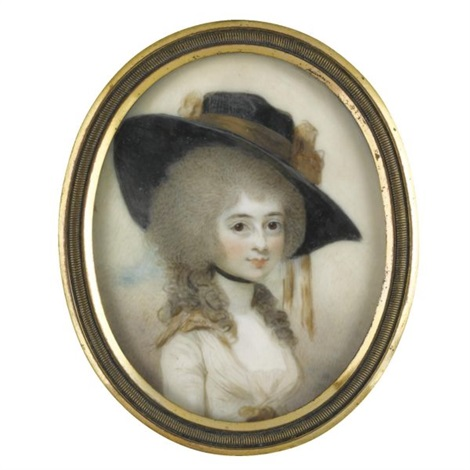
Hone portrait of Anne, Countess of Clare

From 1782 to 1804, Hone lived and worked in Dublin. He spent some of this time in London, working and exhibiting with an address in Piccadilly. He was invited to Ireland by the Countess Temple, where her husband was viceroy. Hone painted portraits of many of the prominent people in Ireland including Lord Albemarle, the 1st earl of Charlemont, Lord Edward Fitzgerald, James Gandon, J. P. Kemble, the countess of Lanesborough, the 2nd duke of Leinster, Lady Elizabeth O'Neill, Lord Powerscourt, and the 4th duke of Rutland. He painted a portrait of the actress Mrs Siddons in 1784. Hone primarily worked in watercolour, but occasionally enamel, as well as producing some engravings.

Hone's time in Dublin is recorded in the book Life of James Gandon by Mulvany and Gandon. He was appointed miniature painter to the prince of Wales in 1795. While living on Capel Street, he appears to have been a close associate of a fellow miniaturist, Sampson Towgood Roch, and may have offered him some training. After Capel Street, Hone moved to Dorset Street. It was in his house in Dorset Street that the painter Francis Grose died in 1791. He moved to 9 Nassau Street in 1794, then to 14 Charlemont Street in 1800, and later at Lower Mount Street from 1801 to 1802. Hone exhibited a number of miniatures in 1800 at Allen's, 32 Dame Street and at the Parliament House in 1801. The Act of Union in 1802 led to a decline in his successful practice in Dublin.

== Later life and death ==
In 1804, Hone left Dublin and moved to Bath.Later he established a studio in Dover Street, London. He continued to work and exhibit with the Royal Academy until 1822. After this, Hone suffered with mental illness, which was documented by Joseph Farington in his diary. In 1820, he applied successfully for a pension from the Royal Academy, citing pending financial ruin. Hone died in his home on Dover Street on 24 May 1825, from an illness related to the gout he had suffered from for a number of years. He is buried at St George's chapel, Bayswater Road, London.
