= Nathaniel Hone the Elder =

Irish painter (1718–1784)

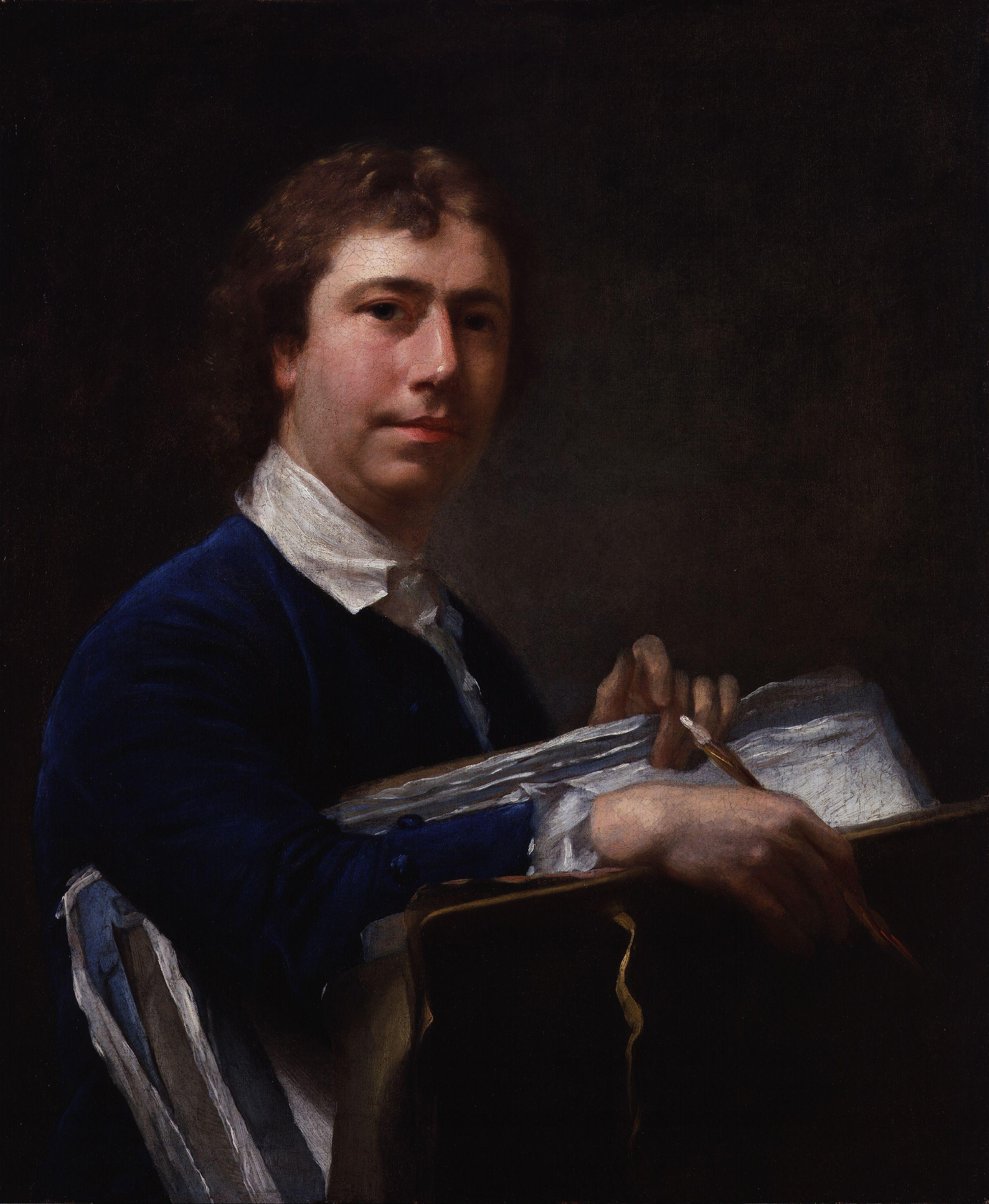
Self-portrait by Nathaniel Hone, circa 1760

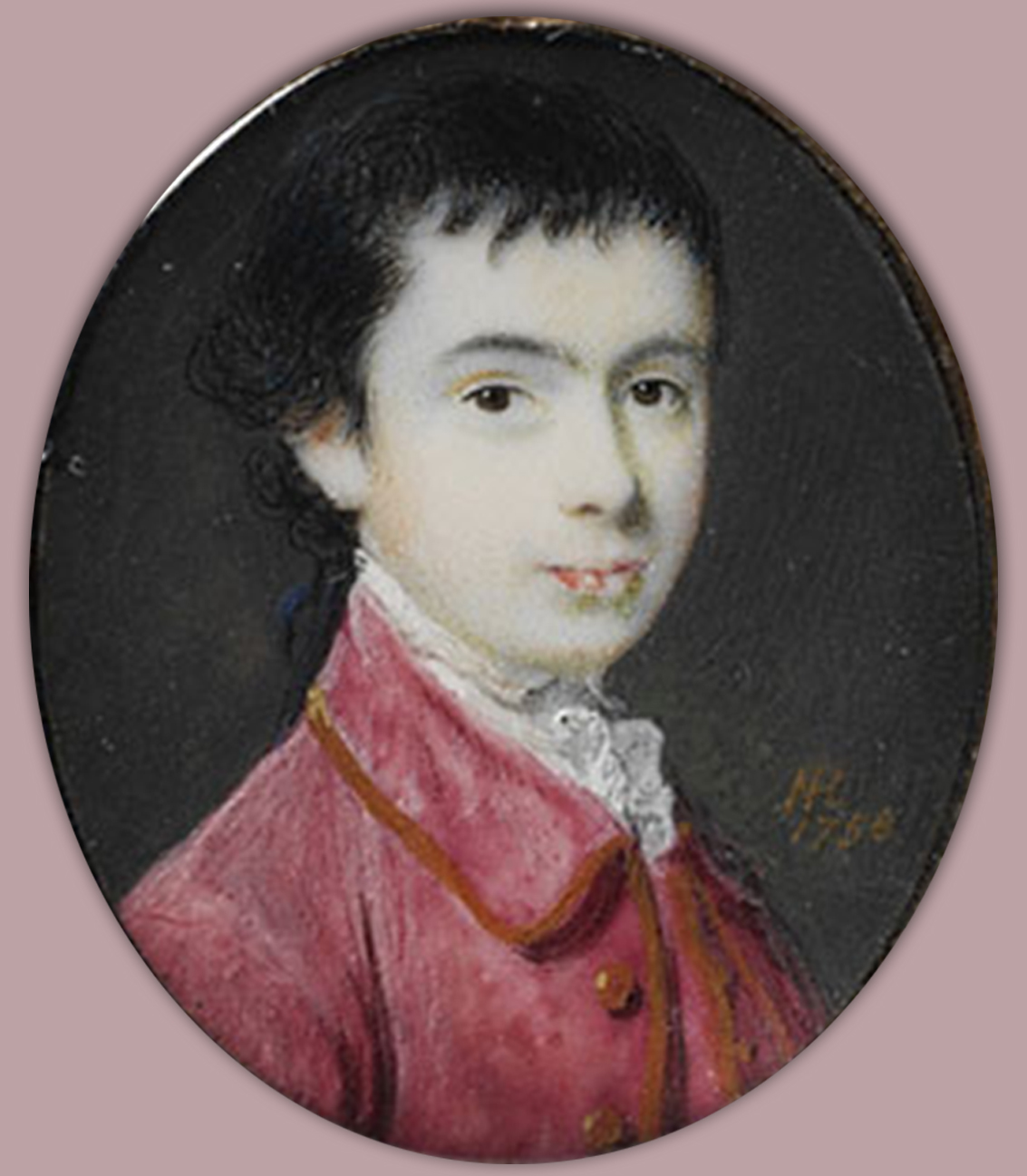
Nathaniel Hone, 1718–84, Portrait of Harry Earl Aged 15. 1758, watercolour on ivory. Victoria & Albert Museum, London.

Nathaniel Hone RA (24 April 1718 – 14 August 1784) was an Irish-born portrait and miniature painter, and one of the founder members of the Royal Academy in 1768.

== Early life ==
The son of a Dublin-based Dutch merchant, Hone moved to England as a young man and, after marrying Molly Earle - daughter of the Duke of Argyll - in 1742, eventually settled in London, by which time he had acquired a reputation as a portrait-painter. While his paintings were popular, his reputation was particularly enhanced by his skill at producing miniatures and enamels. He interrupted his time in London by spending two years (1750–1752) studying in Italy.

== Works ==
As a portrait painter, several of his works are now held at the National Portrait Gallery in London. His sitters included magistrate Sir John Fielding and Methodist preacher John Wesley, and General Richard Wilford and Sir Levett Hanson in a double portrait. He often used his son John Camillus Hone (1745–1836) in some of his works, including his unique portrait of "The Spartan Boy", painted in 1774.

=== The Conjuror ===
He courted controversy in 1775 when his satirical picture The Conjurer (National Gallery of Ireland, Dublin) was seen to attack the fashion for Italian Renaissance art and to ridicule Sir Joshua Reynolds, leading the Royal Academy to reject the painting. It also originally included a nude caricature which was alleged to depict fellow Academician Angelica Kauffman in the top left corner, which was painted out by Hone after Kauffman complained to the academy. The combination of a little girl and an old man has also been seen as symbolic of Kauffman and Reynolds's closeness, age difference, and rumoured affair. To show that his reputation was undamaged, Hone organised a one-man retrospective in London, the first such solo exhibition of an artist's work.

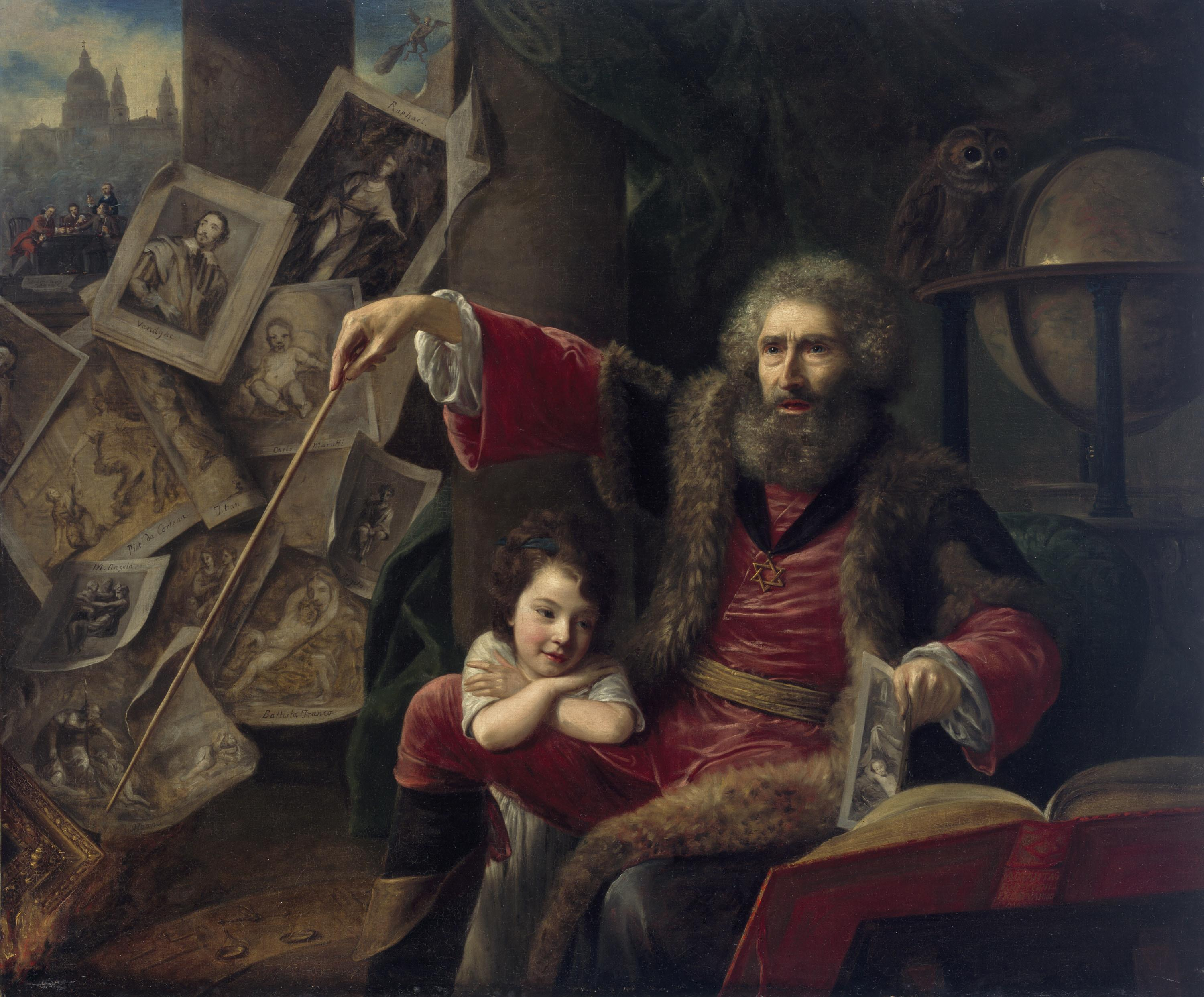
Final, revised, version of The Conjurer, 1775.

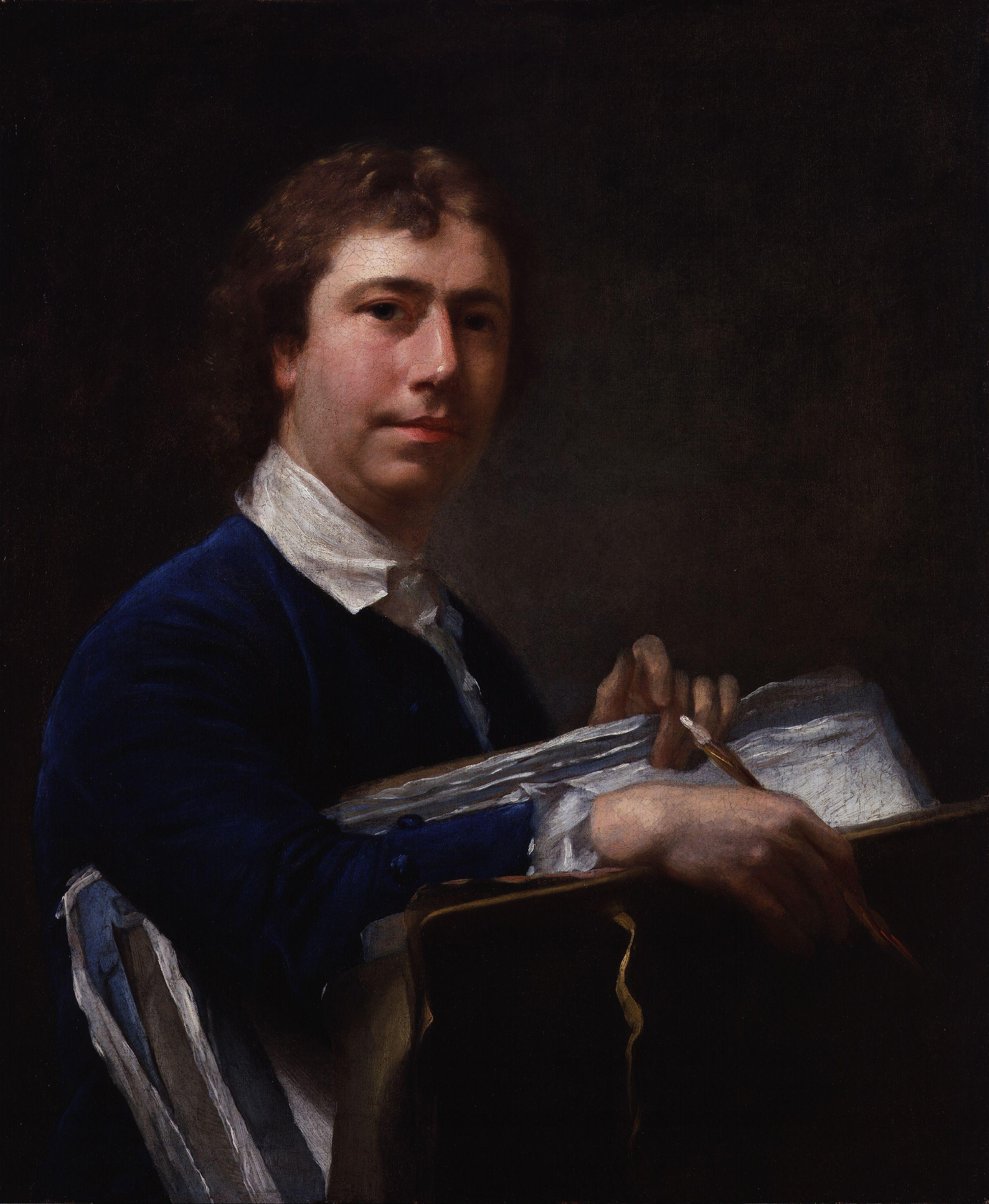
self portrait circa 1760

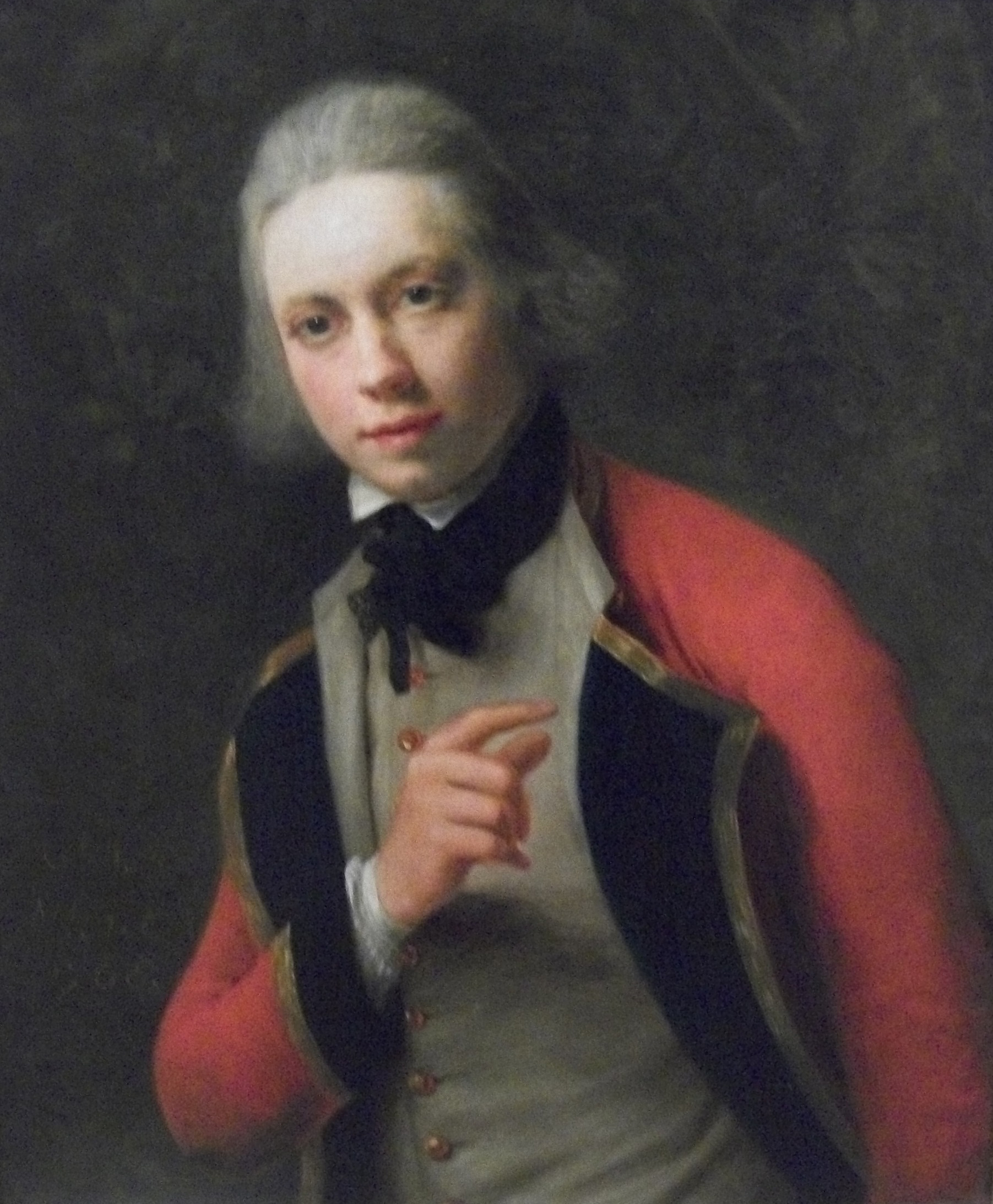
General James Wolfe, 1768, posthumous

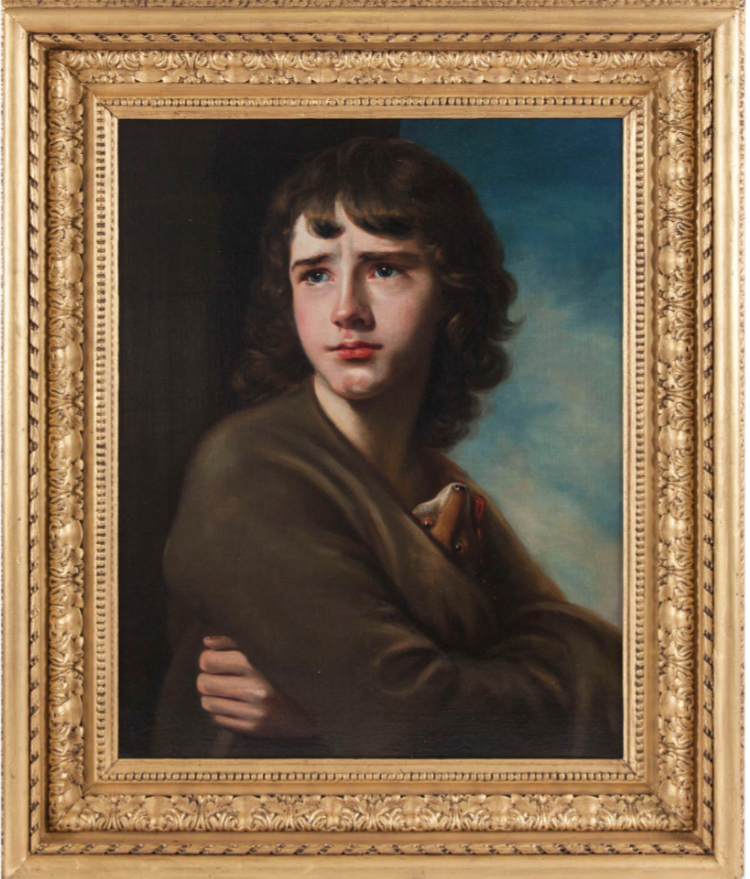
The Spartan Boy, 1774

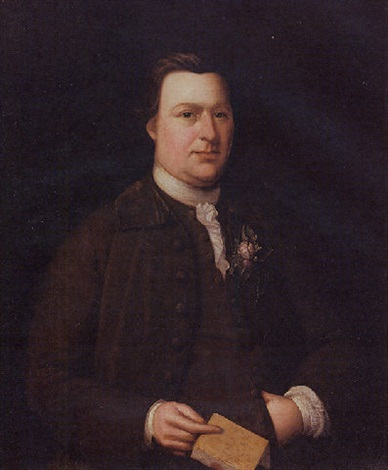
Button Gwinnett

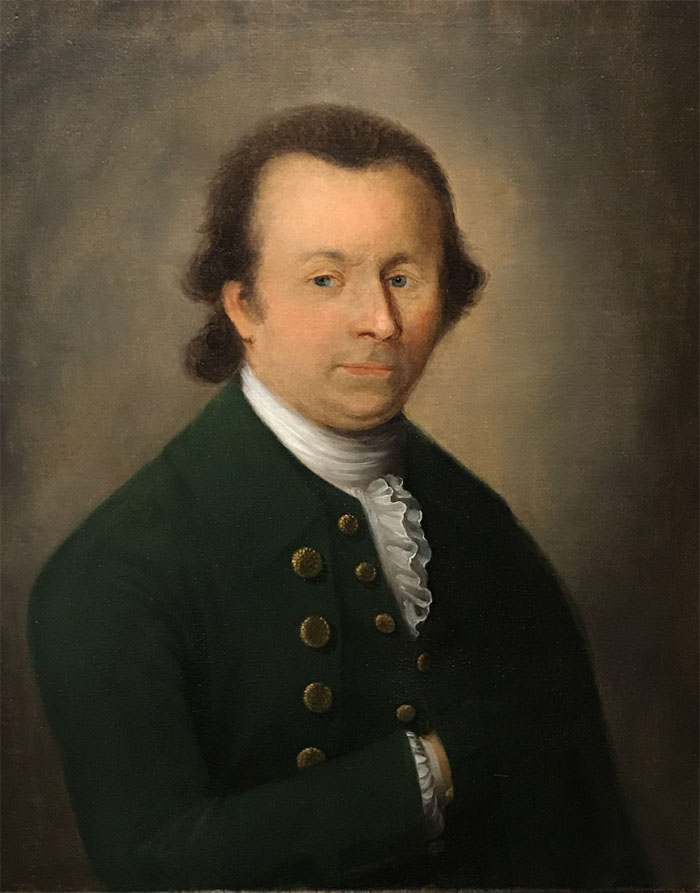
Button Gwinnett

== Family ==
The Hone family is related to the old Dutch landed family the van Vianens, who hold the hereditary title of Vrijheer. His great-grandnephew shared the same name and was also a notable Irish painter, known as Nathaniel Hone the Younger (1831–1917). He is also a relation to painter Evie Hone. Hone had two sons, both of whom became artists, John Camillus and Horace.
