= Brian Hone =

Australian cricketer

Personal information
- Full name: Sir Brian William Hone
- Born: 1 July 1907; Semaphore, South Australia
- Died: 28 May 1978 (aged 70); Paris, France
- Batting: Right-handed
- Role: Batsman

Domestic team information
- Years: Team
- 1928/29–1929/30: South Australia
- 1931–1933: Oxford University
- First-class debut: 30 November 1928 South Australia v Victoria
- Last First-class: 10 July 1933 Oxford University v Cambridge University

Career statistics
Competition	First-class
Matches	44
Runs scored	2768
Batting average	40.11
100s/50s	9/8
Top score	170
Balls bowled	?
Wickets	0
Bowling average	–
5 wickets in innings	–
10 wickets in match	–
Best bowling	–
Catches/stumpings	25/0
- Source: CricketArchive, 2 November 2011

Sir Brian William Hone (1907–1978) was an Australian headmaster and, in his youth, a first-class cricketer.

Brian was born on 1 July 1907 in the Adelaide suburb of Semaphore, South Australia, to Dr. Frank Sandland Hone and his wife, Lucy (née Henderson). He was educated at Prince Alfred College and the University of Adelaide (B.A. Hons, 1928) where he won Blues in cricket, football and tennis. During the 1929–30 cricket season he opened the batting for South Australia, scoring a century against Victoria and averaging nearly 50. In 1930 he was awarded a Rhodes Scholarship to attend New College, Oxford (B.A., 1932; M.A., 1938), and achieved honours in English. (C. S. Lewis was his tutor). He won Blues in cricket and tennis.

Brian was the brother of Garton Hone. He and his wife Enid had four children including educator David.

1933–1939: Taught at Marlborough College, Wiltshire, and was made head of the new department of English. While in England he wrote Cricket Practice and Tactics, (London, 1937).

1940–1950: Headmaster, Cranbrook School, Sydney.

1951–1970: Headmaster, Melbourne Grammar School.

1973–1974: Deputy Chancellor, Monash University.

He died in Paris on 28 May 1978. His remains lie near the Norfolk Island pine planted in Dr J E Bromby's honour in the grounds of Melbourne Grammar School. He was a descendant of William Hone, via William's son the sculptor Alfred Hone.

== Selected bibliography ==
- R. M. Jukes, Liber Melburniensis, 4th edn, Melbourne Church of England Grammar School (Melbourne, 1965)
- J. W. Hogg, Our Proper Concerns (Sydney, 1986)
- C. E. Moorhouse, "Sir Brian Hone", Unicorn, Vol 14 No 1, February 1988
- C. E. Moorhouse, Challenge and Response (Melbourne, 1989)
