= Kate Hone =

British computer scientist

Kate Samara Hone is a British psychologist and computer scientist specialising in human–computer interaction and digital user experience, particularly as applied to the performance, evaluation, and acceptance of educational technology and massive open online courses. She has also been noted for her research on gender stereotypes in preferences for computer speech synthesis. She is a professor of computer science at Brunel University London, where she heads the department of computer science.

== Education and career ==
Hone read experimental psychology at the University of Oxford, where she earned a bachelor's degree in 1990. She went on to graduate study at the University of Birmingham, where in 1992 she earned a master's degree in Work Design and Ergonomics, and completed a Ph.D. in human–computer interaction in 1996; her dissertation was Modelling dialogues for interactive speech systems.

She joined the University of Nottingham in 1995 as a lecturer in psychology, shifting later to computer science, and in 2000 moved to Brunel University London, where was director of the graduate school from 2009 to 2018. She is the head of the Department of Computer Science at Brunel University London as of October 2025, where she has published articles in the International Journal of Human Computer Studies, Interacting with Computers, Behaviour and Information Technology, Applied Ergonomics and Ergonomics.
