= Joseph Hone =

Joseph Marlow Hone (25 February 1937 – 15 August 2016) was a British writer of the spy novel. His most famous novels featured a British spy called Peter Marlow. The first of the series was The Private Sector (1971), set in the Six-Day War. Marlow's story continues in The Sixth Directorate (1975), The Flowers of the Forest (a.k.a. The Oxford Gambit) (1980), and The Valley of the Fox (1982). During his heyday, in the 1970s, Hone was favourably compared with writers such as Len Deighton, Eric Ambler and John le Carré.

== Early life and education ==
Hone was born in London in 1937, son of Nathaniel Marlow Hone (1917–1959), of South Hill, Killiney, County Dublin, Ireland, and Morley House, Chippenham, Wiltshire, and Bridget, daughter of Michael Anthony, of Diltown, County Kilkenny. The Hone family were Irish landed gentry; his grandfather, Joseph Hone, was biographer to George Moore and W. B. Yeats. Hone recounts having been "given away" by his parents and taken to Dublin in his autobiography Wicked Little Joe (2009). He was educated at Kilkenny College and St. Columba's College, Dublin.

== Career ==
Hone had a varied career, including working as an assistant in a second-hand bookshop in London, as a teacher at Drogheda Grammar School in Ireland, and with the Egyptian Ministry of Education in Cairo, Heliopolis and Suez. He also worked for a publishing firm, and in radio and television. In 1960 he became co-founder of Envoy Productions, Dublin, and co-produced a number of plays and musicals at the Theatre Royal, Stratford, East London. He was appointed Radio and Television Officer with the United Nations Secretariat in New York in 1968 and for the next two years he travelled to Ethiopia, Kenya, Uganda, Tanzania, Malawi, India, Pakistan and the Far East, producing documentary programmes based on these travels. The Dancing Waiters (1975) was also based on these experiences. He produced a number of radio programmes for U.N. radio, later broadcast by the BBC.

Hone held various positions in radio and television, including radio and then television critic for The Listener (1971–1980), and an overseas posting with the British Broadcasting Corporation (BBC). He died on 15 August 2016.

== Novels ==
In his first novel, The Private Sector (1971), Marlow, a teacher in Cairo, finds himself becoming a spy for the British. This was based in part on Hone's experiences in 1957–58 as a teacher in Europe. He stated that he had not been associated with Intelligence work but that he had 'worked with and met such people, especially while I was a teacher in Egypt and in New York with the UN.' Hone's second book, The Sixth Directorate (1975), continues Marlow's story after his release from Durham jail, where he has been sent on a frame-up by his own department; it deals with his impersonation of an Englishman, a captured KGB agent living in London, his subsequent adventures as a fall-guy agent in the UN in New York, and his eventual encounter with the KGB in Cheltenham. Hone's last novel was Goodbye Again. Hone's books, including his last novel, have been translated into various languages, including French.

Hone reviewed books for the New York Times Book Review, The Spectator, The New Statesman, and the Daily Telegraph.

Since 2000, Hone had been teaching creative writing and a course which looked at the history and culture of various countries, including India and China. He taught at Wroxton College in Oxfordshire, part of Fairleigh Dickinson University based in New Jersey, USA.

== Personal life ==
In 1964, Hone married Jacqueline, daughter of J. M. Yeend, of Cheltenham, Gloucestershire. The Hones had two children. Hone's brother, Camillus, was adopted by the writer Pamela Travers, the creator of Mary Poppins.

== Bibliography ==
=== Novels ===
- The Private Sector [1971]
- The Sixth Directorate [1975]
- The Paris Trap [1977]
- The Flowers of the Forest [1980], ISBN 978-0436200878, published in the U.S. as The Oxford Gambit
- The Valley of the Fox [1982]
- Summer Hill [1990]
- Return to Summer Hill [1990]
- Firesong [1997]
- Goodbye Again [2011]

=== Non-fiction ===
- The Dancing Waiters [1975]
- Gone Tomorrow [1981]
- Children of the Country: Coast to Coast Across Africa [1986]
- Duck Soup in the Black Sea [1988]
- Wicked Little Joe [2009] ISBN 978-1843511472
