= Leland Hone =

English cricketer

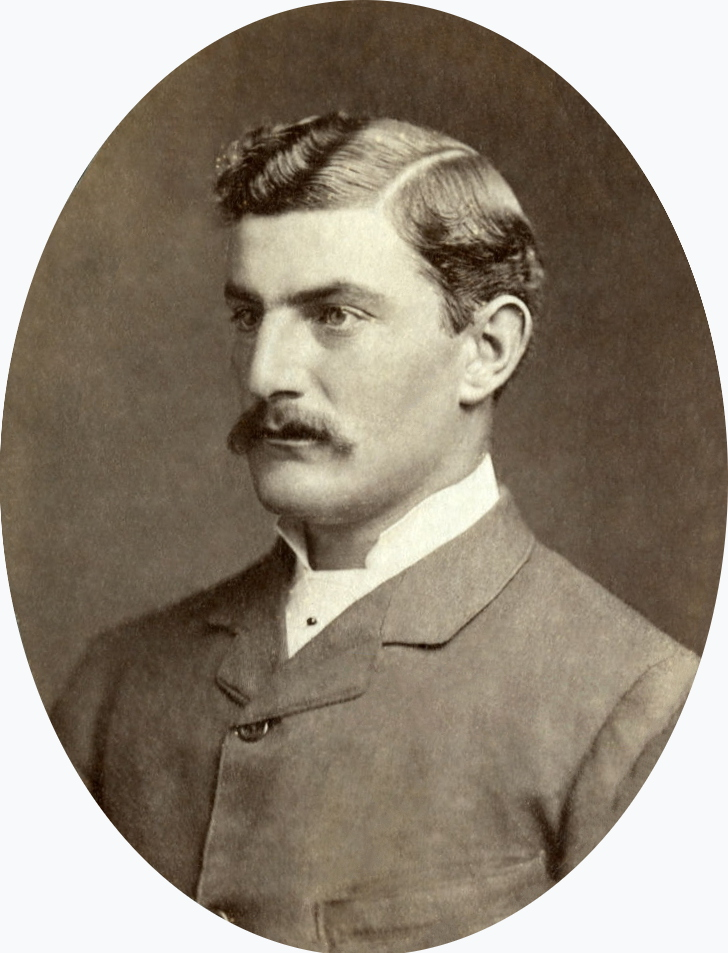
- Hone in about 1878

Personal information
- Born: 30 January 1853; Dublin, Ireland
- Died: 31 December 1896 (aged 43); Dublin, Ireland
- Batting: Right-handed

International information
- National side: England
- Only Test (cap 14): 2 January 1879 v Australia

Career statistics
Competition	Test	First-class
Matches	1	8
Runs scored	13	85
Batting average	6.50	7.08
100s/50s	0/0	0/0
Top score	7	27
Catches/stumpings	2/0	9/2
- Source: CricketArchive, 16 May 2019

Leland Hone (30 January 1853 – 31 December 1896) was an Irish cricketer who played internationally for England and Ireland, in addition to playing first-class cricket for the Marylebone Cricket Club.

== Playing career ==
A right-handed batsman and wicket-keeper, Hone made his debut for Ireland in August 1875 playing against I Zingari. He played three more matches against I Zingari in August of each of the following three years, scoring 74 not out in 1877, his highest score for Ireland. In 1878, he made his first-class debut, playing for the MCC against Cambridge University. After one more game against Oxford University he was chosen to tour Australia under the captaincy of Lord Harris.

When it became clear that the side lacked a regular wicket-keeper, Hone was drafted in for the only Test of the tour, playing against Australia in January 1879, becoming the first player to represent England without playing county cricket and the first Irishman to represent England.

He played four more first-class matches on the tour, two each against New South Wales and Victoria, and returned to the Ireland team for matches against the MCC and Surrey that summer. He played one final first-class match for the MCC in 1880 against Oxford University at Lord's. He continued playing club cricket, and represented Ireland twice in 1883 before a final game against I Zingari in August 1888.

== Statistics ==
In his matches for Ireland, he scored 321 runs at an average of 24.69. He took sixteen catches and six stumpings. In his only Test match, he scored 13 runs and took two catches. In first-class cricket, he scored 85 runs at an average of 7.08, taking nine catches and two stumpings.

== Family ==
Hone came from a cricketing family. His brothers William and Nathaniel also played for Ireland, as did his cousins William, Thomas and Jeffery. His nephew Pat Hone also played for Ireland.
