= Nathaniel Hone the Younger =

Irish painter

Nathaniel Hone, the Younger
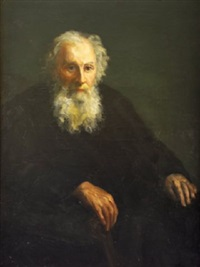
- Nathaniel Hone, the younger, Self-portrait as an old man
- Born: 26 October 1831
- Died: 14 October 1917 (aged 85)
- Education: Paris
- Known for: Painter
- Movement: Orientalist; Barbizon school

Nathaniel Hone the Younger (26 October 1831 – 14 October 1917) was an Irish painter, the great-grand-nephew of the painter Nathaniel Hone.

== Life and career ==
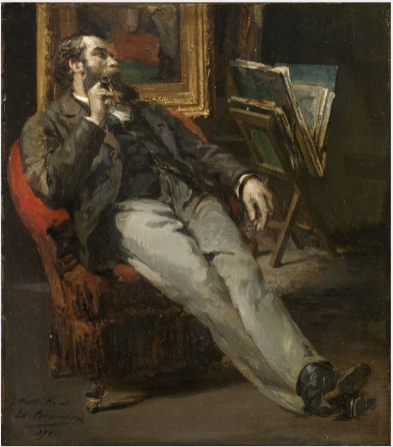
portrait by Edouard Brandon, 1870

Hone studied at Trinity College Dublin. He began his career as a railway engineer but gave this up to study art in Paris. Most of his later paintings are landscapes, very often enlivened with animals and occasionally with figures. He was a member of the Hone family. In France he was influenced by the painter Gustave Courbet who was taking a new and quite revolutionary realistic approach. His closest painting tips were, however, from another French impressionist, Camille Corot. Hone became a close friend of one of Corot's followers at the Barbizon School of landscape painting. Hone stayed at Barbizon for 17 years where he learned to appreciate colour, texture and tone in the landscape, and applied it in strong and confident brushworks to the painting of Irish subjects on his return. In Paris, Hone worked closely with artist Édouard Brandon, also a follower of Corot's, and stayed with him at 44, rue du Notre Dame de Lorette.

Hone established Malahide Golf Club in 1892 and is now one of Dublin's premier golf courses and restaurants.

== Work ==
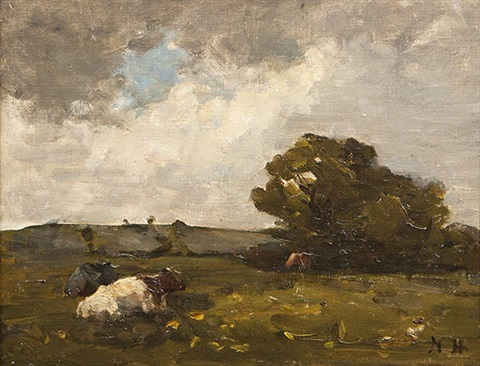
Pastures at Malahide, (aka Cattle at Malahide) by Nathaniel Hone, the younger

Hone's paintings which were completed in France have many similarities to those that he worked on to his country farm in Co. Dublin, but the finish is perhaps more polished and professional in the later Irish works. Hone produced many pictures at Malahide, County Dublin. One of his finest pieces is Pastures at Malahide (pictured). Cows in the foreground of the painting rest quietly grazing against the low horizon. This allows for a large amount of space to be given to the rich and dominating sky full of white cumulus clouds. The atmosphere is one of peace and tranquility, while being typically Irish with the feeling of impending rain.

In 1901 Hone shared an exhibit with John Butler Yeats in Dublin. After his death his widow donated over 500 of his oil paintings and approximately 900 watercolours and drawings to the National Gallery of Ireland.

== See also ==
- List of Orientalist artists
- Orientalism
