= Pat Hone =

Cricket information
- Batting: Right-handed

International information
- National side: Ireland

Career statistics
Competition	First-class
Matches	6
Runs scored	162
Batting average	13.50
100s/50s	0/1
Top score	92
Catches/stumpings	7/–
- Source: CricketArchive, 16 November 2022

William Patrick Hone MC (28 August 1886 – 28 February 1976) was an Irish cricketer. A right-handed batsman and wicket-keeper, he played six times for the Ireland cricket team between 1909 and 1928, all of which were first-class matches.

== Biography ==
The son of William Hone, himself an Irish international cricketer, Pat Hone was born in Monkstown, County Dublin in August 1886. He was educated at Wellington College, Berkshire in England before attending Dublin University for four years from 1907, where he captained their cricket team for two years.

He made his debut for the Ireland team on their tour of the United States of America in 1909, playing two matches against Philadelphia. He then played three matches against Scotland in 1910, 1913 and 1914, scoring 92 in the second innings of the 1913 match, his highest score for Ireland.

Hone served in the Royal Artillery in the First World War, reaching the rank of Captain and being awarded the Military Cross in September 1918 for "conspicuous gallantry and devotion to duty" when he extinguished the flames of his artillery battery when it caught fire under heavy shelling.

After the war, he spent time as a railway engineer in India before returning to Ireland in 1928. His selection that year at the age of 44 for a match against the MCC met with much criticism and ended in failure as he scored three and six runs in the match. This was his last match for Ireland.

He continued playing club cricket and was featured in friendly matches even in his 60s. He served as president of the Irish Cricket Union in 1955 and published the first attempt at a history of Irish cricket that year, entitled "Cricket in Ireland."

He died in 1976, and his obituary was in the 1977 Wisden Cricketers' Almanack, which stated that he toured Canada with Ireland in 1908 which is inaccurate.

== Statistics ==
In his matches for Ireland, he scored 162 runs at an average of 13.50. He took seven catches.

== Family ==
Hone came from a cricketing family. As already mentioned, his father William played for Ireland, as did his uncle Nathaniel. Another uncle, Leland Hone also played for Ireland in addition to playing one Test match for England.
