= David Hone =

Australian former sportsman (born 1946)

Personal information
- Full name: David Jeremy Hone
- Born: 30 June 1946 (age 80); Melbourne, Victoria, Australia
- Batting: Right-handed
- Bowling: Right-arm medium
- Role: Bowler

Domestic team information
- Years: Team
- 1970: Oxford University

Career statistics
Competition	First-class
Matches	3
Runs scored	26
Batting average	5.20
100s/50s	0/0
Top score	13
Balls bowled	416
Wickets	1
Bowling average	284.00
5 wickets in innings	0
10 wickets in match	0
Best bowling	1/82
Catches/stumpings	1/–
- Source: CricketArchive, 16 November 2022

David Jeremy Hone (born 30 June 1946) is an Australian former sportsman who played first-class cricket with Oxford University and Australian rules football for Melbourne in the Victorian Football League (VFL).

Hone spent the 1969 VFL season with the Melbourne Football Club as an amateur, and played 18 of a possible 20 games during year, mostly as a defender.

An honours graduate from Monash University, Hone chose to continue his studies in England and became a student at Worcester College, Oxford, in 1970. His father Brian Hone had been a famous educator.

He made three first-class cricket appearances for the university in 1970, as an opening bowler. The first was against Hampshire, who were being captained by former West Indian Test cricketer Roy Marshall. In a drawn match, Hone took the wicket of Hampshire opener Richard Lewis but managed no further dismissals from his 36 overs. He went wicket-less from his two other first-class matches, against Worcestershire and Nottinghamshire, to finish with a disappointing average of 284.

Hone returned to Australia in 1971 and although he began training again with Melbourne, he never played another VFL game.

During the early 1980s he was the head of history at Melbourne Grammar, and from 1986 until 1993 the headmaster of Scotch Oakburn College in Launceston. In 1994 he became principal of Westminster School, Adelaide and remained there until 1999. He was then head of the senior school at Beaconhills College before retiring and taking up a role with the University of the Third Age.
