= John Camillus Hone =

English painter of miniataures (1759–1836)

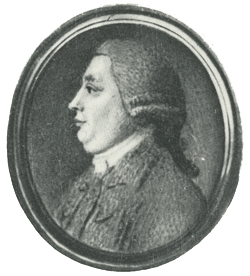
- Portrait of Hone, possibly by Nathaniel Hone the Elder
- Born: 1759; Frith Street, London, England
- Died: 23 May 1836 (aged 76–77); Summerhill, Dublin, Ireland
- Spouse: Abigail Hone (m. 1807)

John Camillus Hone (1759 – 23 May 1836) was an English painter of miniatures.

== Life and family ==
John Camillus Hone was born in 1759 in London. His parents were Nathaniel and Mary Hone (née Earle) of York, England. His father was a miniaturist who gave Hone is initial training. Hone was one of 10 children, 5 of whom survived to adulthood. His brother, Horace, was also an artist. Hone is believed to be the model in his father's painting, "The Piping Boy", aged 9.

Hone married his cousin Abigail Hone in October 1807. Hone died on 23 May 1836 at his home at 14 Summerhill, Dublin. Abigail died on 4 February 1855, reputedly 103 years old. Though other sources give her death date in 1887 at age 105.

== Career ==
Hone exhibited his first work, "Portrait of a Lady", at the Free Society in London in 1775. The next year he exhibited "St Francis" and "The Spartan Boy". He next exhibited in 1779. He exhibited with the Royal Academy from 1776 to 1780. He emigrated to the East Indies, where he continued to practice successfully as an artist.

Hone moved to Dublin in 1790, where he was appointed "Engraver of Dies" at the Stamp Office by the Lord Lieutenant, Earl of Westmoreland. Having taken up this post he appears to have retired from painting, exhibiting just once in 1809 with 3 oil portraits at an exhibition on Hawkins Street.
