= William Hone (cricketer) =

Cricket information
- Batting: Right-handed

International information
- National side: Ireland

Career statistics
| Competition | First-class |
|---|---|
| Matches | 9 |
| Runs scored | 266 |
| Batting average | 20.46 |
| 100s/50s | 0/1 |
| Top score | 76 |
| Balls bowled | 108 |
| Wickets | 3 |
| Bowling average | 21.33 |
| 5 wickets in innings | 0 |
| 10 wickets in match | 0 |
| Best bowling | 3/41 |
| Catches/stumpings | 6/– |
- Source: CricketArchive, 16 November 2022

William Hone (9 May 1842 – 20 March 1919) was an Irish cricketer. A right-handed batsman, he played eleven times for the Ireland cricket team between 1861 and 1878 and also played nine first-class matches, mostly for the MCC.

== Playing career ==
Hone made his debut for Ireland in September 1861, playing against I Zingari. He played against the Irish military the following month, against the MCC in May 1862 and against I Zingari in September 1863, before beginning his first-class career.

He made his first-class debut for the MCC in July 1864, playing against Middlesex at Lord's. He next played for them against Oxford University and Surrey in 1866. In 1867, he played three matches for the MCC, against Cambridge University, Oxford University and Surrey. He scored 76 in the first innings of the match against Oxford University, his highest first-class score. He also played against Cambridge University for Southgate in a first-class match that year.

He returned to the Irish side in September 1867, playing a match against I Zingari. He played another first-class match for the MCC, against England at Lord's in June 1868 and three days later played against the MCC for Ireland on the same ground, during which he took 4/20, his best bowling figures for Ireland. He followed this with a match against I Zingari, scoring 91 in the Irish innings, his only half-century for Ireland.

He played four more times for Ireland, three times against I Zingari and once against the MCC, his last Irish game coming in August 1878 against I Zingari. He also played one more first-class match for the MCC, against Cambridge University in June 1877.

== Statistics ==
In first-class cricket, Hone scored 266 runs at an average of 20.46 and took three wickets at an average of 21.33. In matches for Ireland, he scored 274 runs at an average of 17.12 and took eight wickets at an average of 9.62.

== Family ==
Hone came from a cricketing family. His brother Nathaniel also played for Ireland, as did another brother Leland who also played Test cricket for England. Three of his cousins, William, Thomas and Jeffery, also played for Ireland as did his son Pat.
