= Bridge of Sighs, Ducal Palace and Custom House =

Painting by J. M. W. Turner

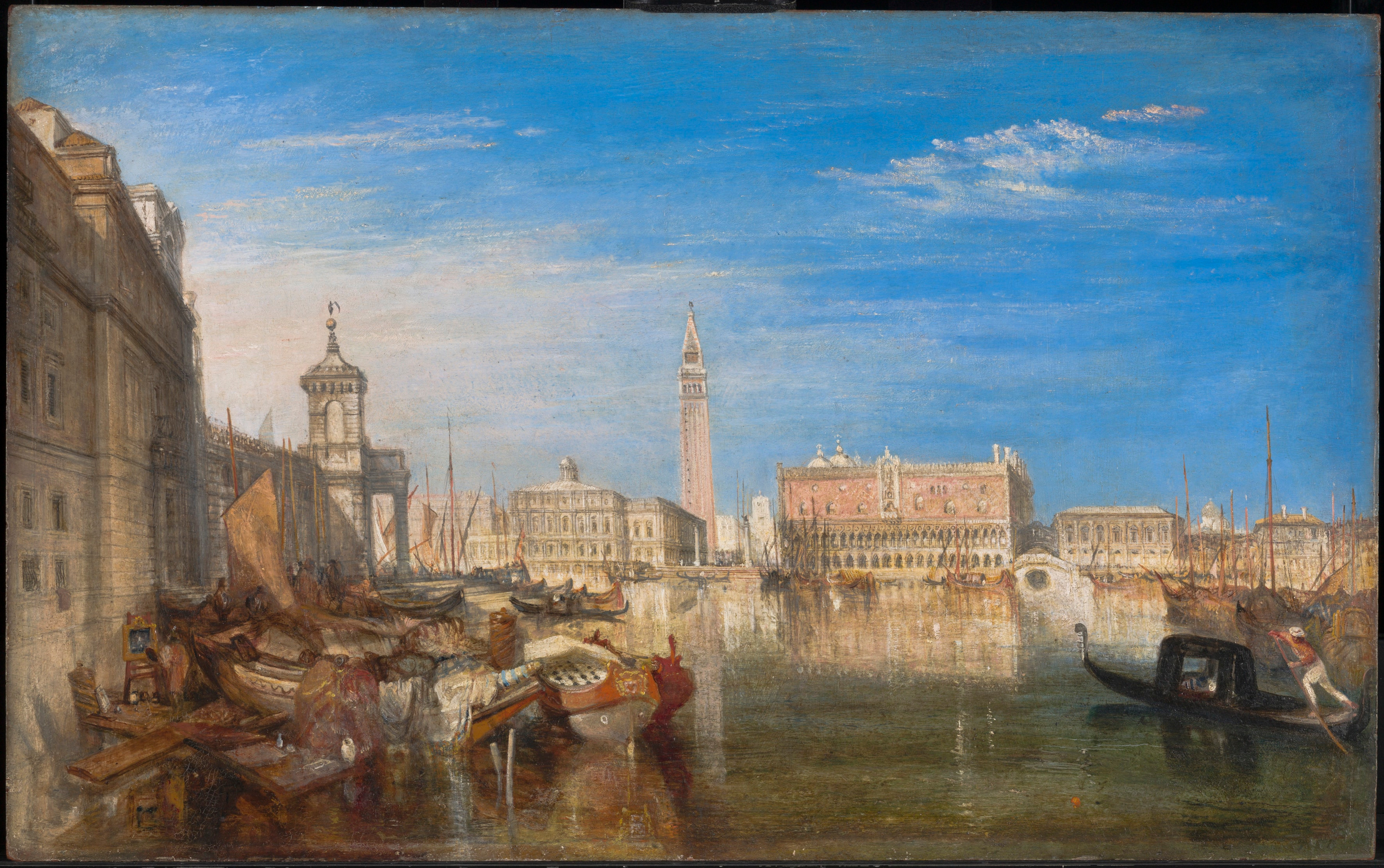
- Artist: J. M. W. Turner
- Year: 1833
- Type: Oil on canvas, landscape painting
- Dimensions: 51.1 cm × 81.6 cm (20.1 in × 32.1 in)
- Location: Tate Britain, London
- Website: www.tate.org.uk/...n00370

Bridge of Sighs, Ducal Palace and Custom-House, Venice: Canaletti Painting is an 1833 landscape painting by the British artist J.M.W. Turner. Featuring a scene in Venice, a decade after he had first visited, it was intended as a homage to the legendary eighteenth century artist Canaletto, who is shown in the left foreground. It was the first of a series of oil depictions of Venice that Turner would produce over the next decade. It has also been suggested that Turner was putting himself into competition with his friend and rival Clarkson Stanfield, who also painted the view.

It was displayed at the Royal Academy Exhibition of 1833 held at Somerset House in London. It was acquired there for 200 guineas by the art collector Robert Vernon who presented it to the National Gallery in 1847 as part of the Vernon Gift. Today it is in the collection of the Tate Britain in Pimlico.

== See also ==
- List of paintings by J. M. W. Turner

== Bibliography ==
- Bailey, Anthony. J.M.W. Turner: Standing in the Sun. Tate Enterprises Ltd, 2013.
- Baker, Christopher. J.M.W. Turner: The Vaughan Bequest.
- Costello, Leo. J.M.W. Turner and the Subject of History. Routledge, 2017.
- Finberg, Alexander Joseph. In Venice with Turner. Cotswold Gallery, 1930.
- Hamilton, James (ed.) Turner and Italy. National Galleries of Scotland, 2009.
