= The Prince of Orange Landing at Torbay =

Painting by J. M. W. Turner

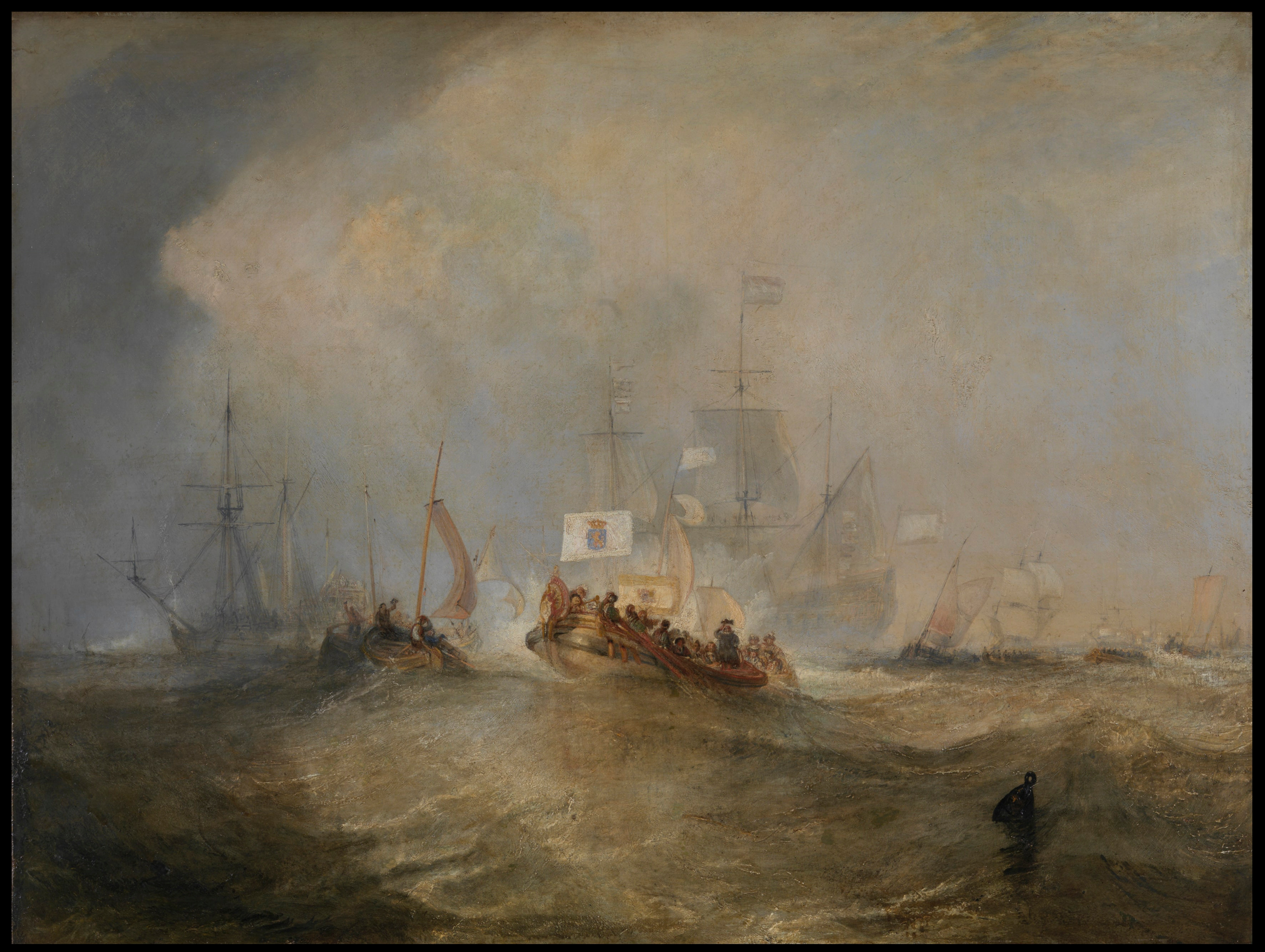
- Artist: J. M. W. Turner
- Year: 1832
- Type: Oil on canvas, history painting
- Dimensions: 90.2 cm × 120 cm (35.5 in × 47 in)
- Location: Tate Britain, London
- Accession: N00369
- Website: tate.org.uk/art/artworks/turner-the-prince-of-orange-william-iii-embarked-from-holland-and-landed-at-torbay-n00369

The Prince of Orange, William III, Embarked from Holland, and Landed at Torbay, November 4th, 1688, after a Stormy Passage is an 1832 marine history painting by the English artist Joseph Mallord William Turner. It depicts an event from the Glorious Revolution of 1688 when William III had landed at Brixham. It is also known by the shorter title The Prince of Orange Landing at Torbay.

After the birth of James, Prince of Wales in 1688 appeared to secure the Catholic succession, William led an invasion force that sailed from Holland and landed on the English coast at the Devon port of in Torbay. Within a short time the government of James II collapsed and William and his wife Mary II were declared dual monarchs. The timing of Turner's painting coincided with the debate over the Great Reform Act and the artist may have drawn a direct parallel between the events of 1688 and the present.

Turner exhibited the painting at the Royal Academy's 1832 Summer Exhibition at Somerset House. It was acquired by the art collector Robert Vernon who in 1847 donated it to the National Gallery as part of the Vernon Gift. It was then donated to the Tate Gallery and remains in the collection today. The engraver William Miller produced a print based on the painting, a copy of which is now in the British Museum.

== See also ==
- List of paintings by J. M. W. Turner

== Bibliography ==
- Bailey, Anthony. J.M.W. Turner: Standing in the Sun. Tate Enterprises, 2013.
- Bachrach, Fred G. H. Turner's Holland. Tate Gallery, 1994.
- Hamilton, James. Turner - A Life. Sceptre, 1998.
