= The Cavalier's Pets =

Painting by Edwin Landseer

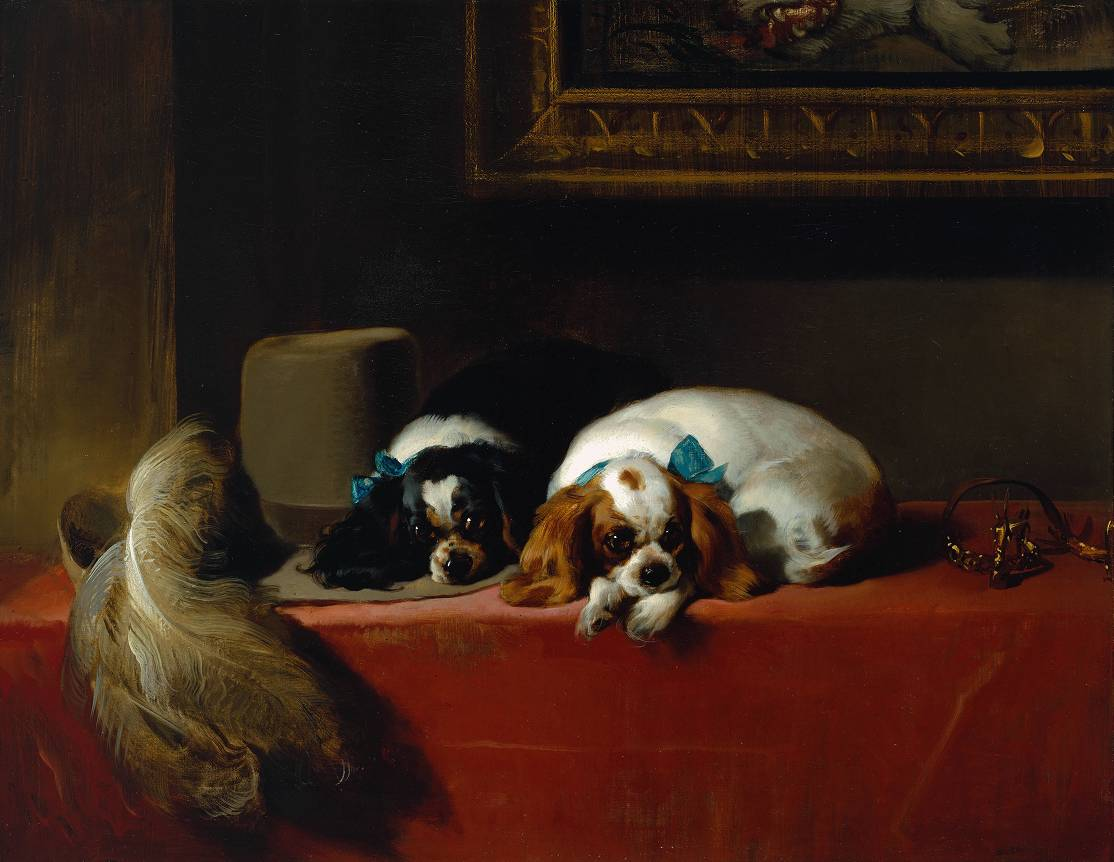
- Artist: Edwin Landseer
- Year: 1845
- Type: Oil on canvas, genre painting
- Dimensions: 90.2 cm × 69.8 cm (35.5 in × 27.5 in)
- Location: Tate Britain; London

The Cavalier's Pets is an 1845 oil painting by the British artist Edwin Landseer. It portrays two King Charles Spaniels, seated amidst several historical objects. This makes reference to their close association with Charles II and the wider Cavalier movement of Royalist supporters during the seventeenth century. The picture is also known by the alternative title King Charles Spaniels.

Like his earlier A Scene at Abbotsford it combines elements of animal portraiture with historical allusions. The painting was displayed at the annual exhibition of the British Institution held in Pall Mall. In 1847 Vernon presented it to the National Gallery as part of the large Vernon Gift of artworks. Today the picture forms part of the collection of the Tate Britain.

== Bibliography ==
- Donald, Diana. Picturing Animals in Britain, 1750–1850. Yale University Press, 2007.
- Ormond, Richard. Sir Edwin Landseer. Philadelphia Museum of Art, 1981.
