= Highland Music =

Painting by Edwin Landseer

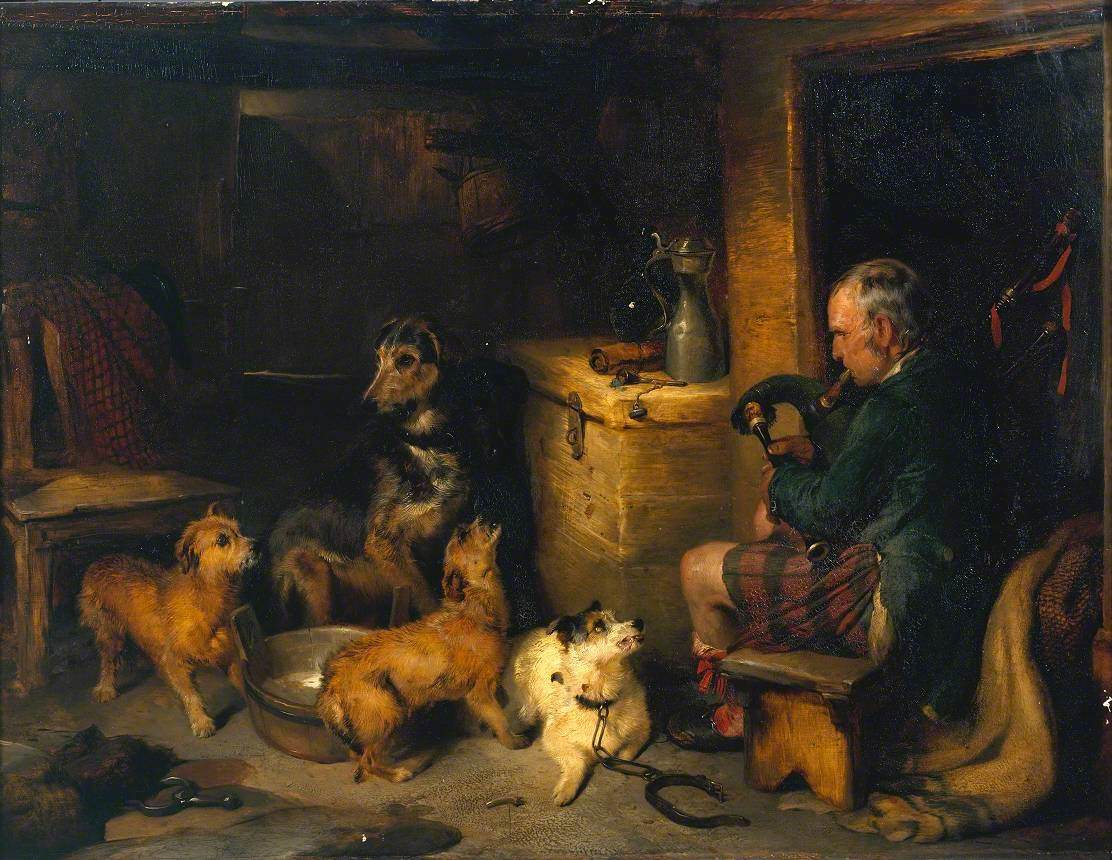
- Artist: Edwin Landseer
- Year: 1833
- Type: Oil on mahogany, genre painting
- Dimensions: 59.1 cm × 47 cm (23.3 in × 19 in)
- Location: Tate Britain; London

Highland Music is an 1829 oil painting by the British artist Edwin Landseer. A genre painting set in the Scottish Highlands, it shows a bagpiper playing and accompanied by several dogs. The English Landseer had been visiting the Highlands regularly since 1824 and it featured prominently in his work. It is distinctly Romantic in style.

The painting was displayed at the annual London exhibition of the British Institution in 1830. It was acquired by the art collector Robert Vernon, who in 1847 donated it to the National Gallery as part of the Vernon Gift. Today it is in the collection of the Tate Britain in Pimlico.

== Bibliography ==
- Donald, Diana. Picturing Animals in Britain, 1750-1850. Yale University Press, 2007.
- Ormond, Richard. Sir Edwin Landseer. Philadelphia Museum of Art, 1981.
- Wiseman, Sam. Assembling Identities. Cambridge Scholars Publishing, 2014.
