= Lake Como (painting) =

Painting by Clarkson Stanfield

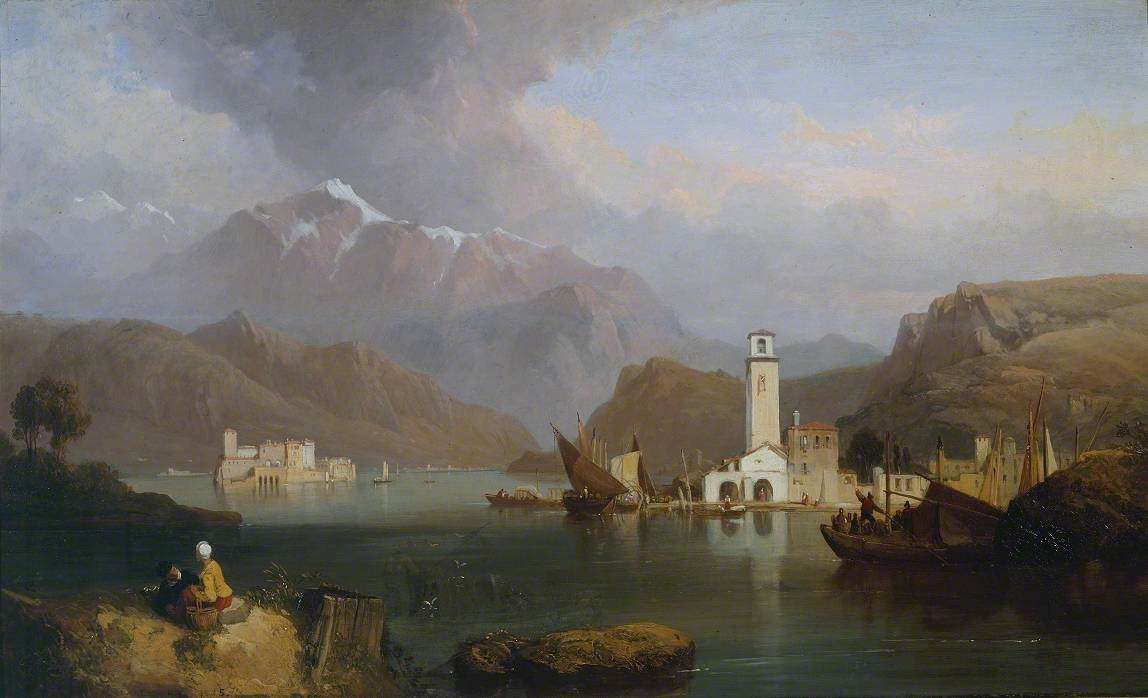
- Artist: Clarkson Stanfield
- Year: 1825
- Medium: Oil on canvas, landscape painting
- Dimensions: 76.8 cm × 46 cm (30.2 in × 18 in)
- Location: Tate Britain; London

Lake Como is an 1825 landscape painting by the British artist Clarkson Stanfield. It shows a view of Lake Como in Northern Italy. It is typical of the picturesque landscapes of Italy being produced during the period to appeal to the growing tourist market through engravings featured in guide books.

This is one of the earliest oil paintings produced by the artist. Stanfield was a former sailor known for his work as a scenic designer at the Theatre Royal, Drury Lane. At the time he was exhibiting at the Society of British Artists before later switching to the more prestigious Royal Academy. The painting was acquired by the art collector Robert Vernon, who in 1847 donated it to the nation as part of the Vernon Gift. It is in the collection of the Tate Britain in Pimlico.

== Bibliography ==
- Van der Merwe, Pieter & Took, Roger. The Spectacular career of Clarkson Stanfield. Tyne and Wear County Council Museums, 1979.
- Wright, Christopher, Gordon, Catherine May & Smith, Mary Peskett. British and Irish Paintings in Public Collections: An Index of British and Irish Oil Paintings by Artists Born Before 1870 in Public and Institutional Collections in the United Kingdom and Ireland. Yale University Press, 2006.
