= Malvolio and the Countess =

Painting by Daniel Maclise

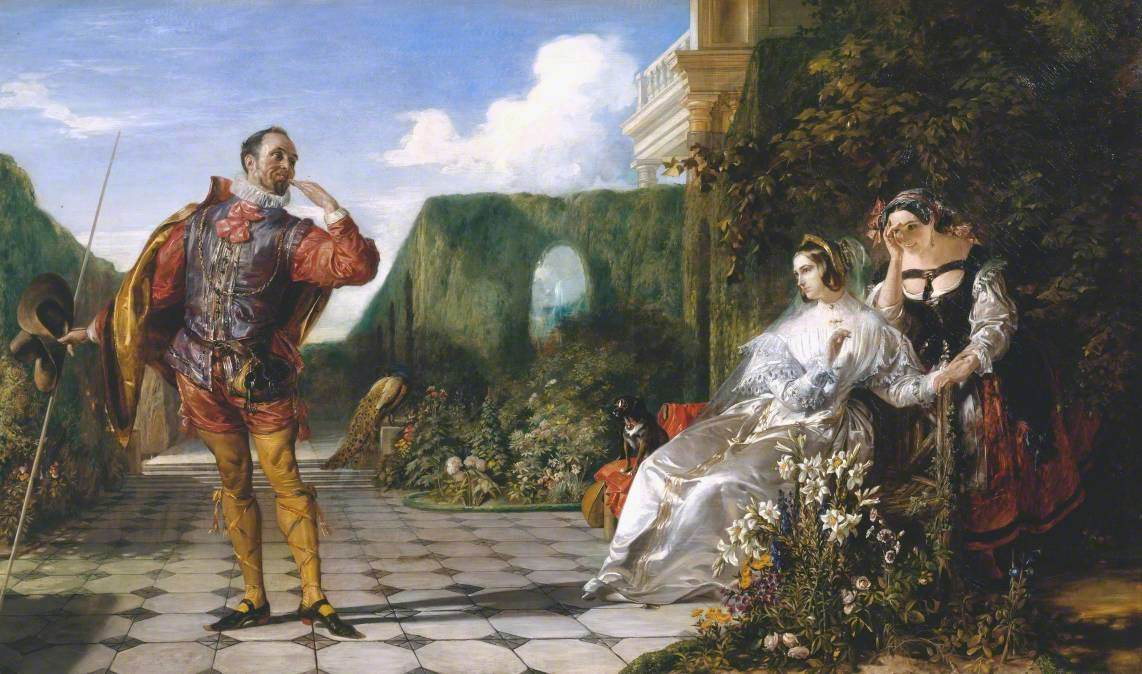
- Artist: Daniel Maclise
- Year: 1840
- Type: Oil on canvas, genre painting
- Dimensions: 152.4 cm × 73.7 cm (60.0 in × 29.0 in)
- Location: Tate Britain, London

Malvolio and the Countess is an 1840 oil painting by the Irish artist Daniel Maclise. A genre painting, it depicts a scene from William Shakespeare's Elizabethan comedy Twelfth Night, where the pompous steward Malvolio—who has been tricked into believing his employer, the Countess Olivia, is in love with him—behaves so strangely that Olivia assumes he must have gone mad.

Works based on popular literature were popular during the early Victorian era and Maclise and the American Charles Robert Leslie were noted for their success in the genre. The painting was displayed at the Royal Academy Exhibition of 1840 at the National Gallery in London, one of two Shakespearian subjects he exhibited that year along with The Banquet Scene in Macbeth. It was acquired by the art collector Robert Vernon, who donated it to the National Gallery in 1847 as part of the Vernon Gift. Today it forms part of the collection of the Tate Britain in Pimlico.

== Bibliography ==
- Murray, Peter. Daniel Maclise, 1806-1870: Romancing the Past. University of Michigan, 2008.
- Weston, Nancy. Daniel Maclise: Irish Artist in Victorian London. Four Courts Press, 2001.
