= Vernon Gift =

Collection of artwork in London

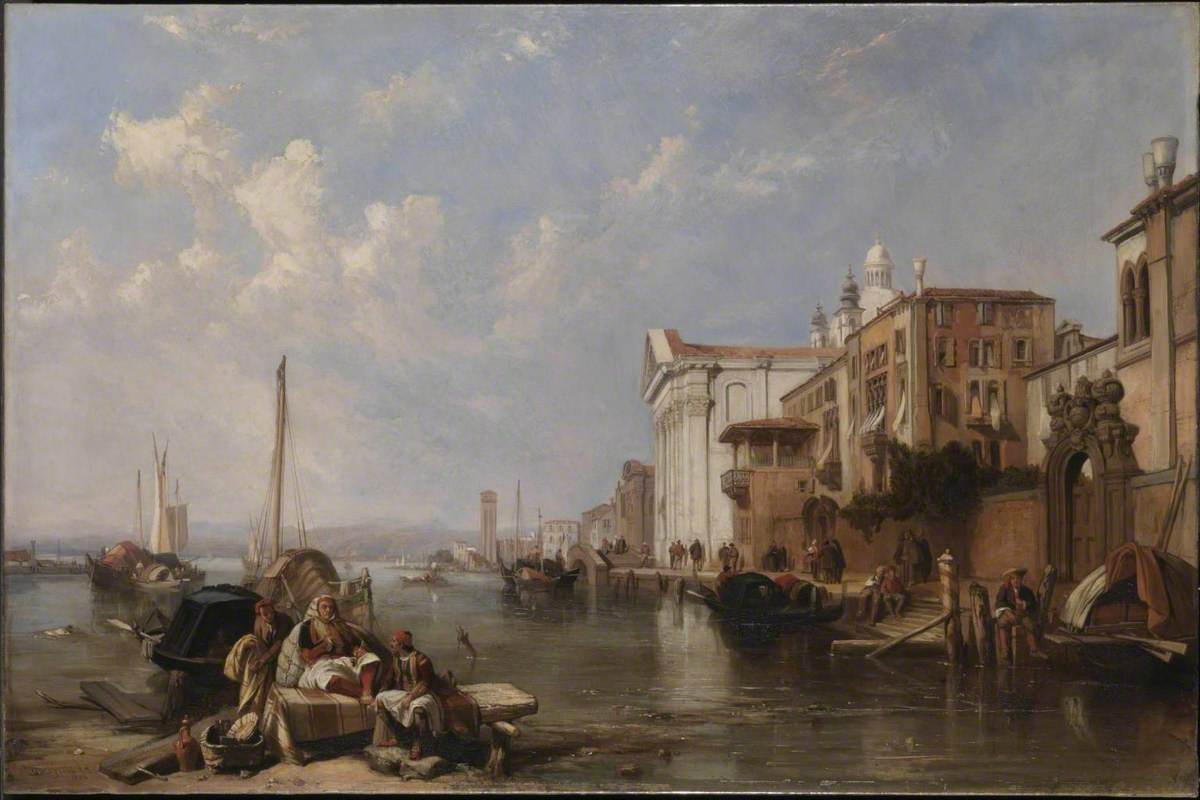
The Canal of the Guidecca, and the Church of the Gesuati, Venice by Clarkson Stanfield, 1836. Vernon collected works by popular British contemporary artists such as Stanfield.

The Vernon Gift was a major donation of artworks by the British art collector Robert Vernon, presented to the nation in 1847. It initiated a wave of public donations during the Victorian era

Vernon, a wealthy businessman and noted collector, was a prominent supporter of contemporary British art. He often bought his works from the annual exhibitions of the Royal Academy and the British Institution. In total he presented 166 works from his collection to the nation. He died the following year. Notable painters whose works he donated include John Constable, William Etty, Joshua Reynolds, Clarkson Stanfieldand J.M.W. Turner.

The donation formed the basis of the British collection of the National Gallery. This represented a significant shift, as when the Gallery has been established in 1824 it featured a single painting by a contemporary artist David Wilkie's The Village Holiday. Later many of the paintings were transferred to the Tate Britain in Pimlico.

== Gallery ==
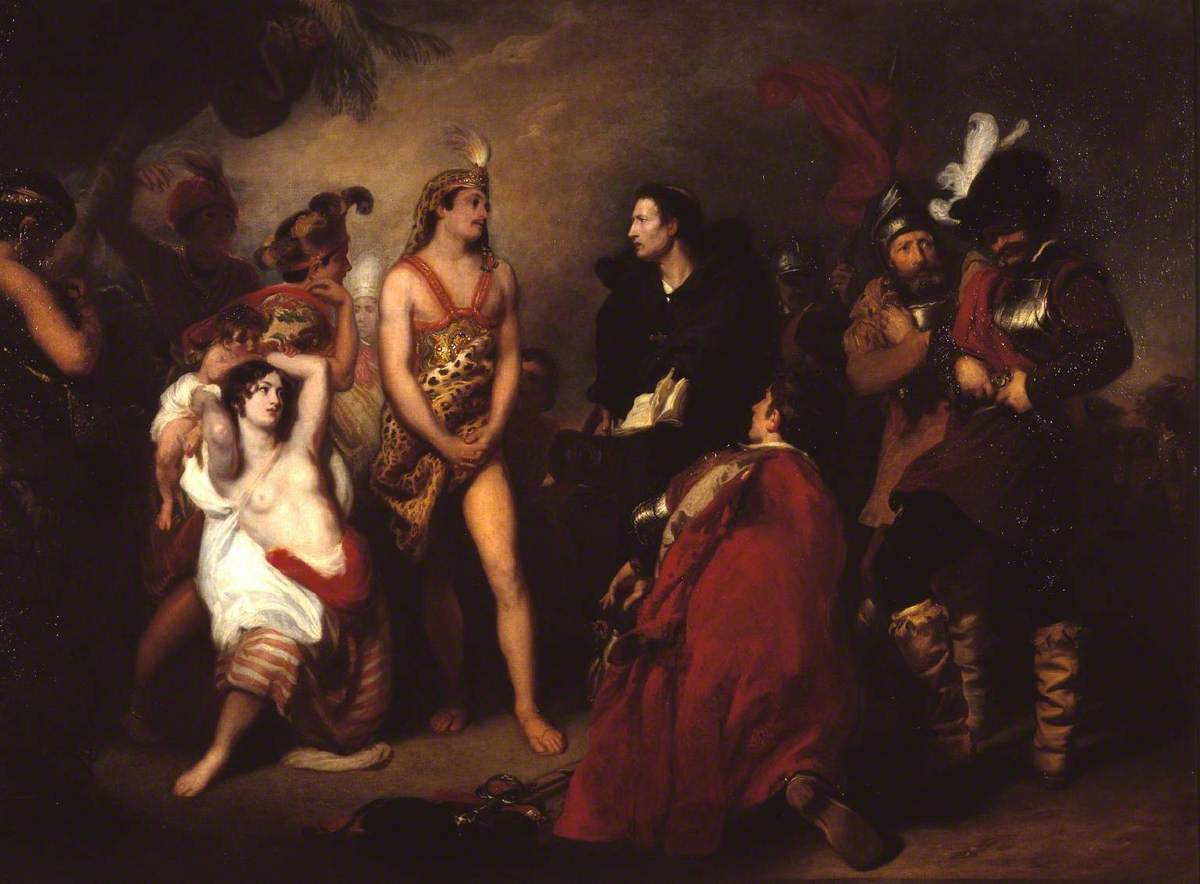
The First Interview Between the Spaniards and the Peruvians by Henry Perronet Briggs

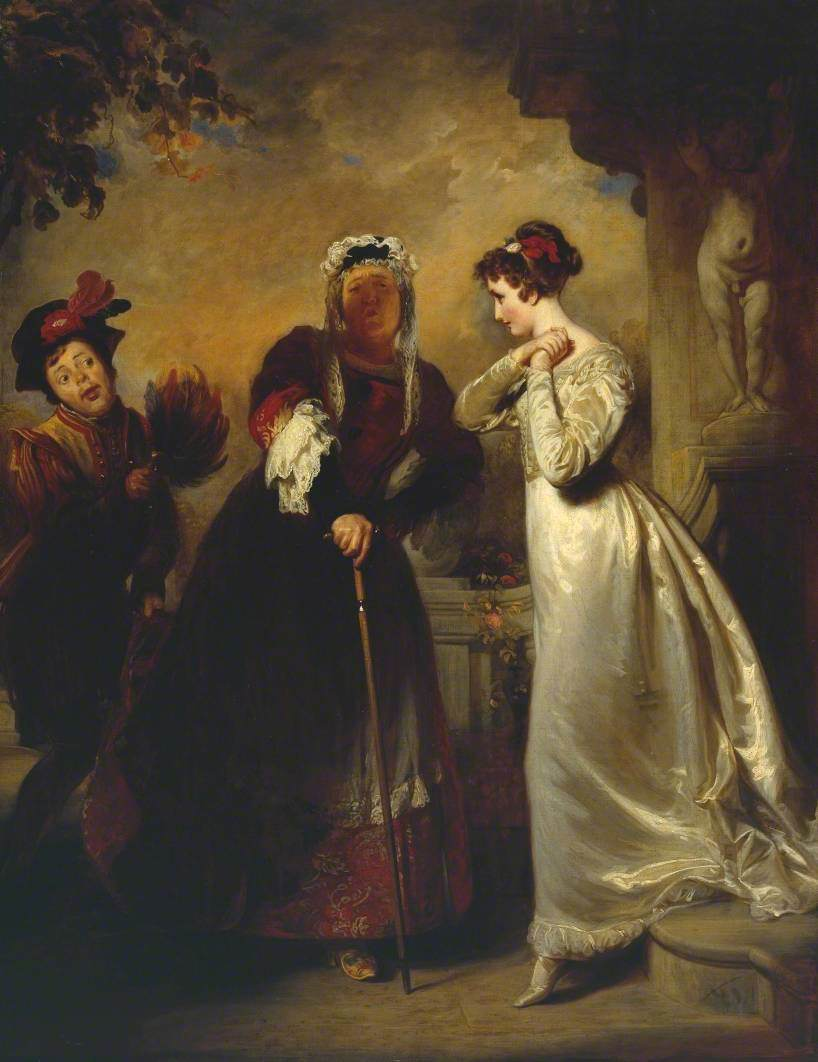
Juliet and Her Nurse by Henry Perronet Briggs

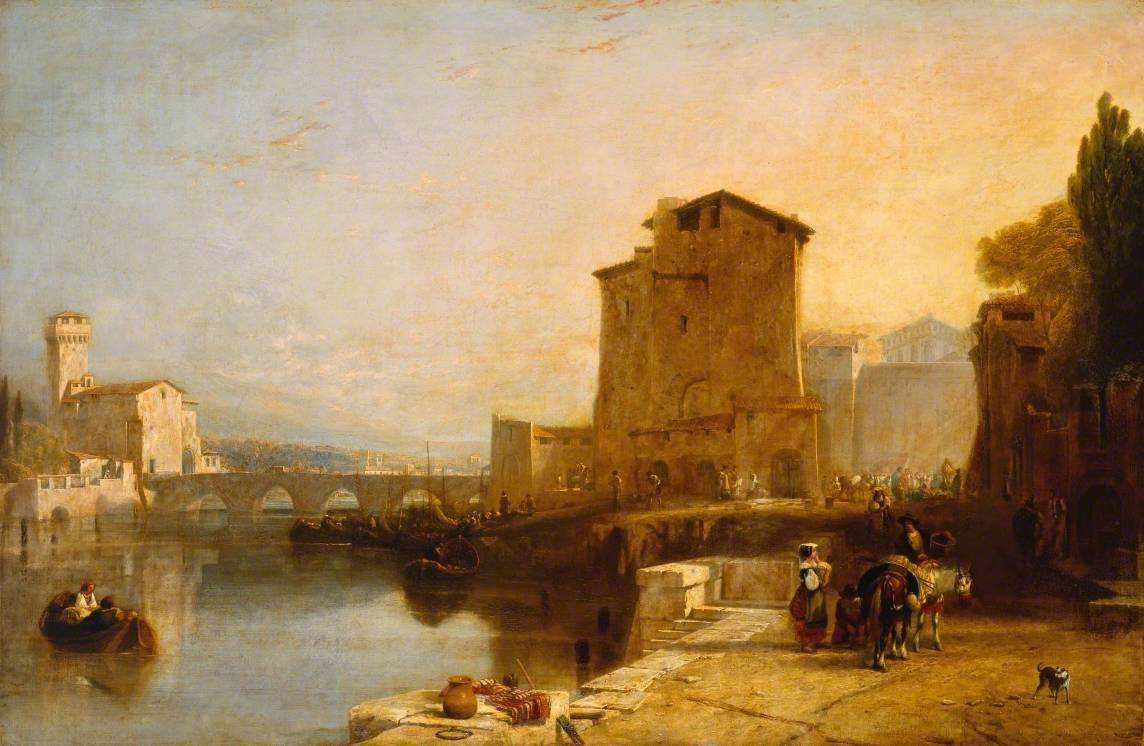
Entrance to Pisa from Leghorn by Augustus Wall Callcott

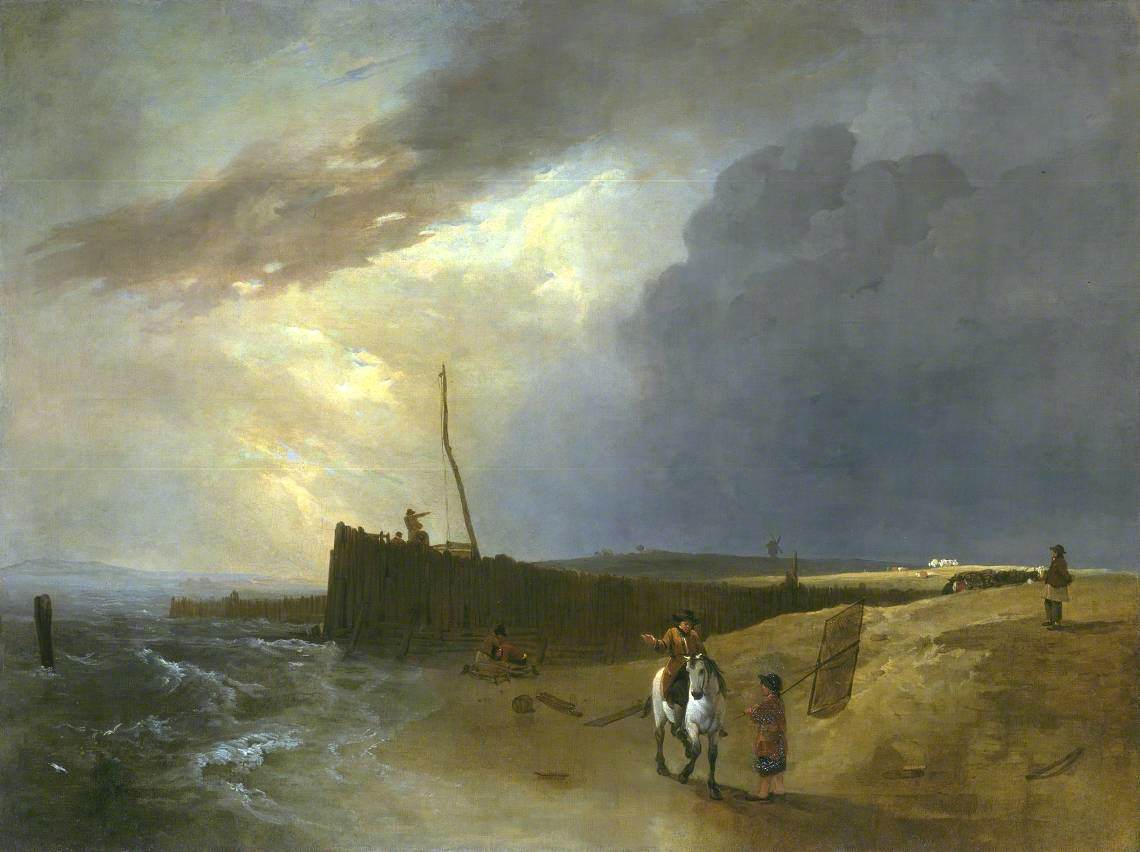
Littlehampton Pier by Augustus Wall Callcott

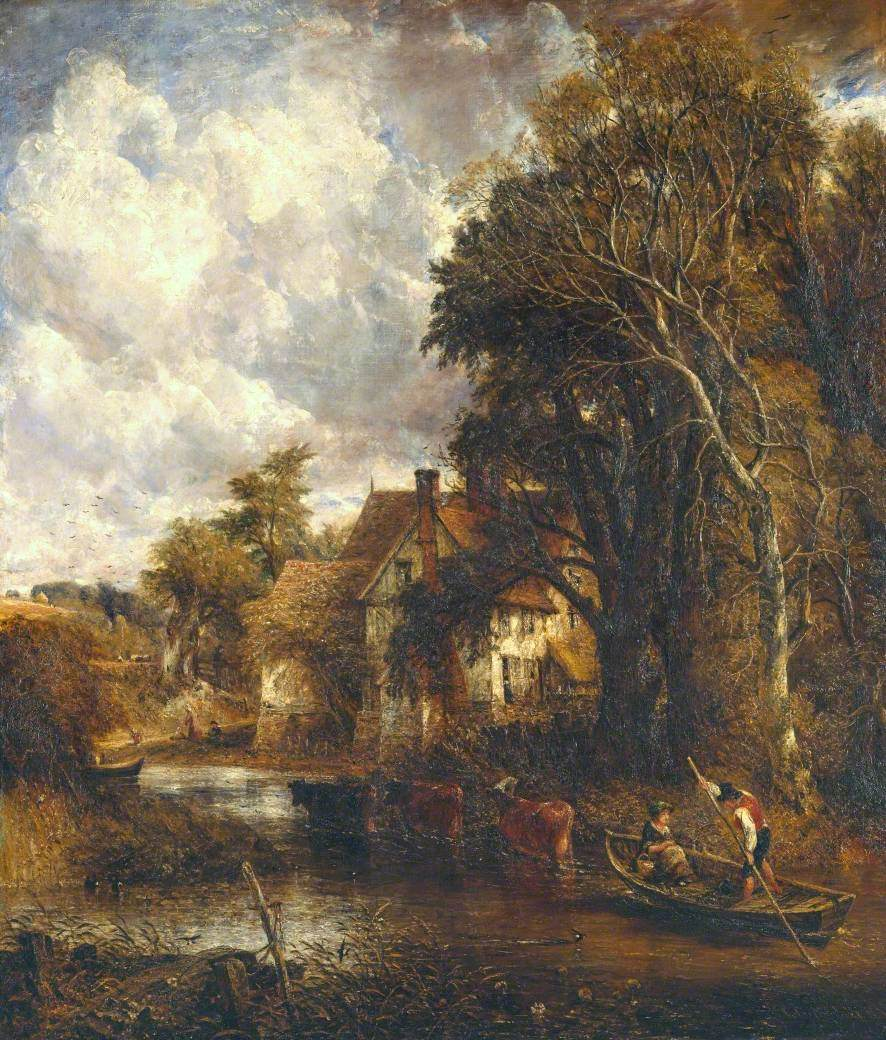
The Valley Farm by John Constable

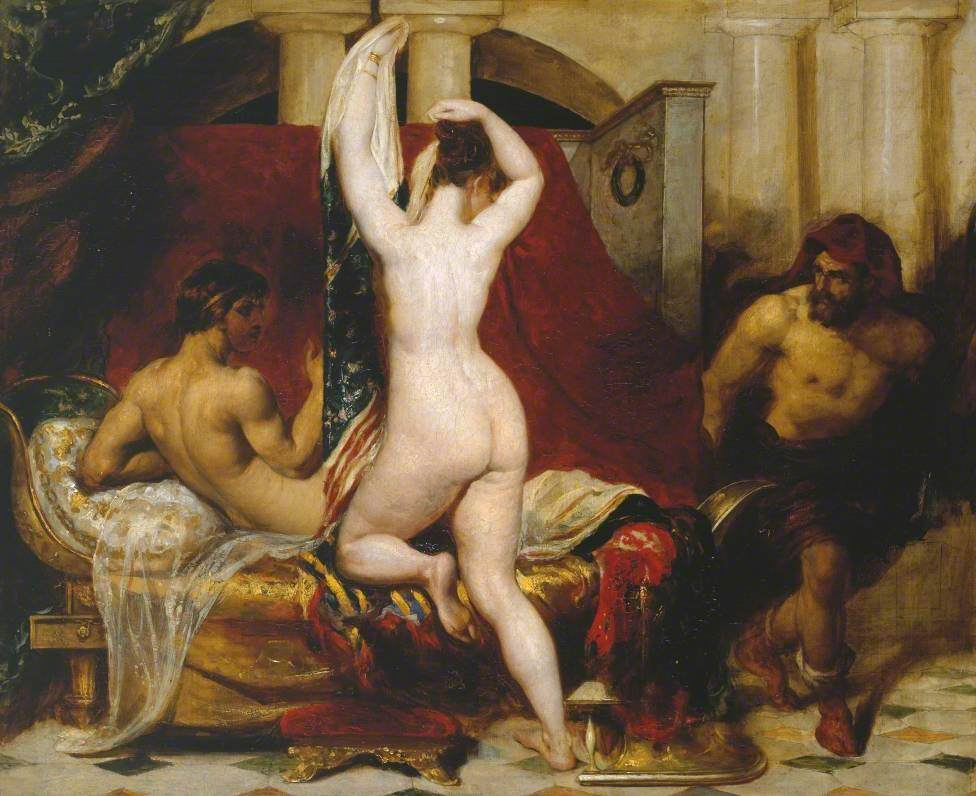
The Imprudence of Candules by William Etty

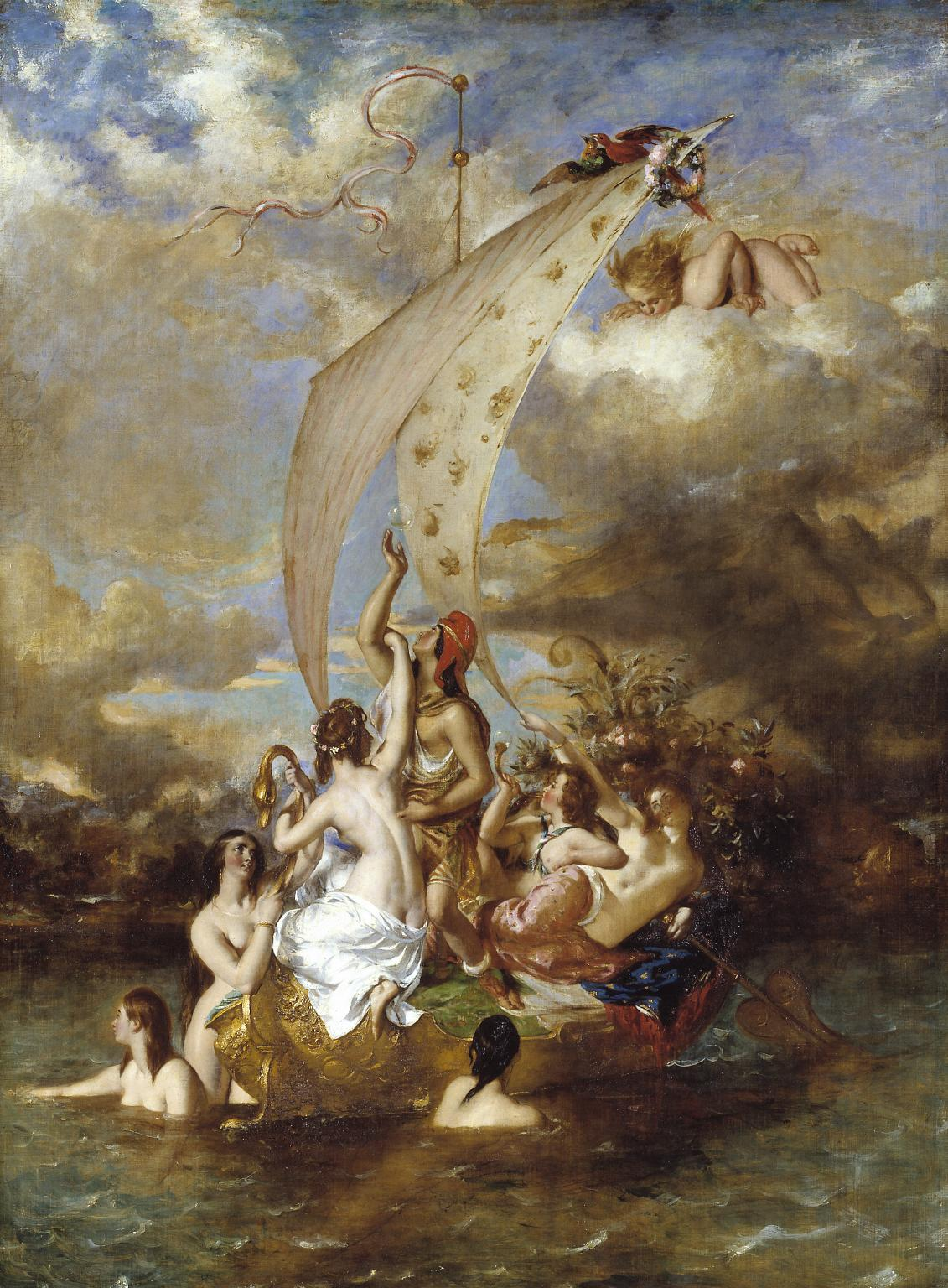
Youth on the Prow, and Pleasure at the Helm by William Etty

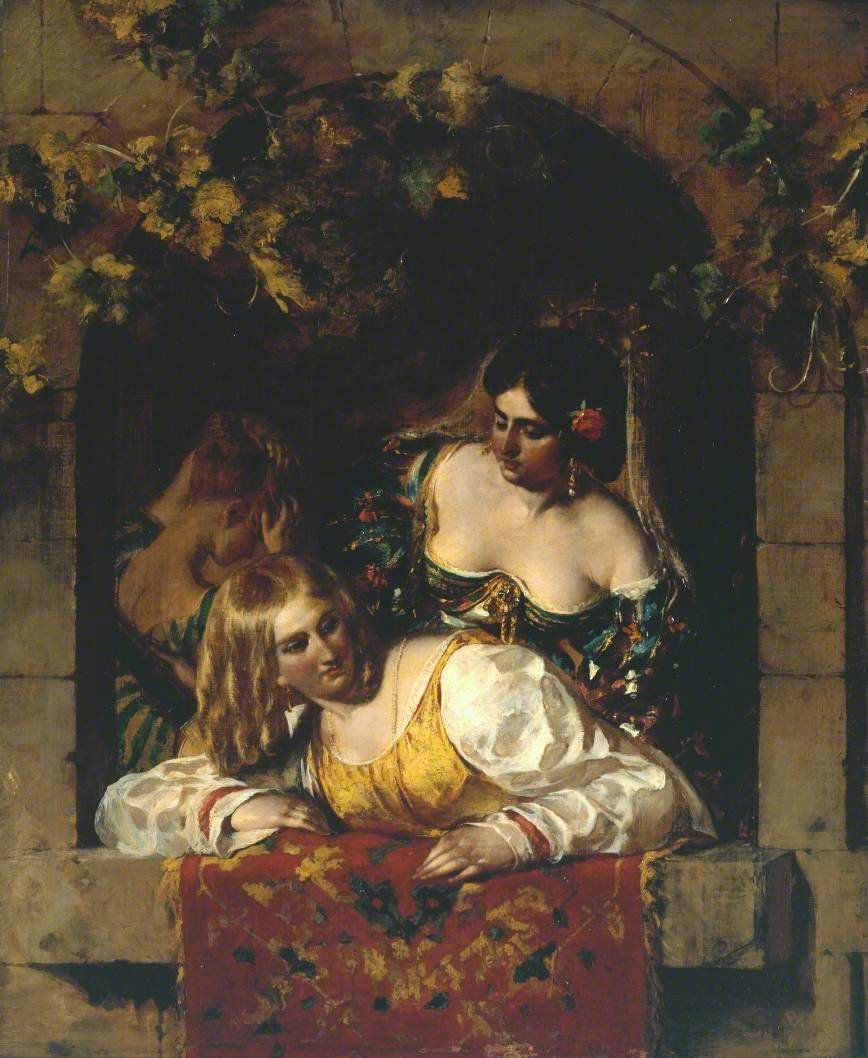
Window in Venice During a Festa by William Etty

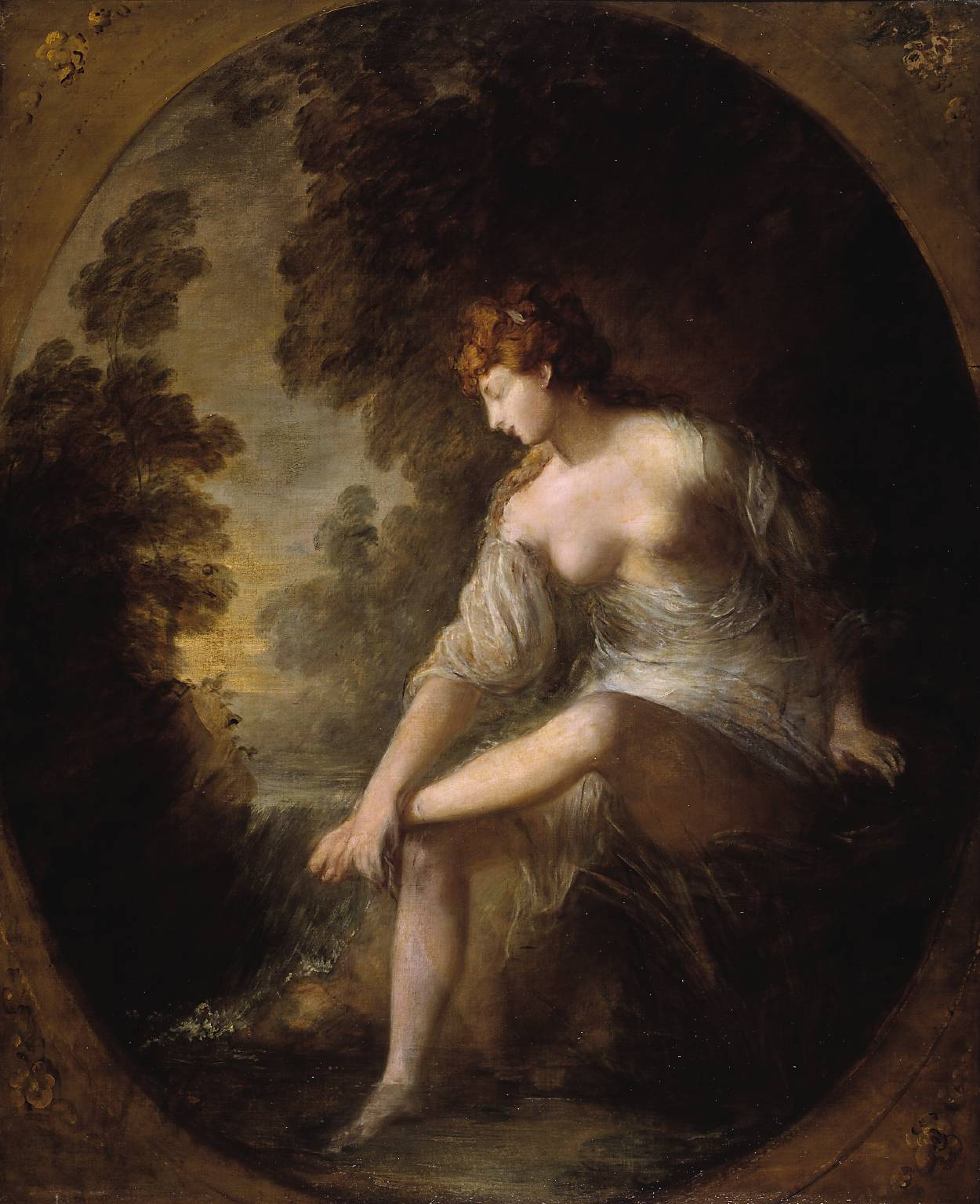
Musidora by Thomas Gainsborough

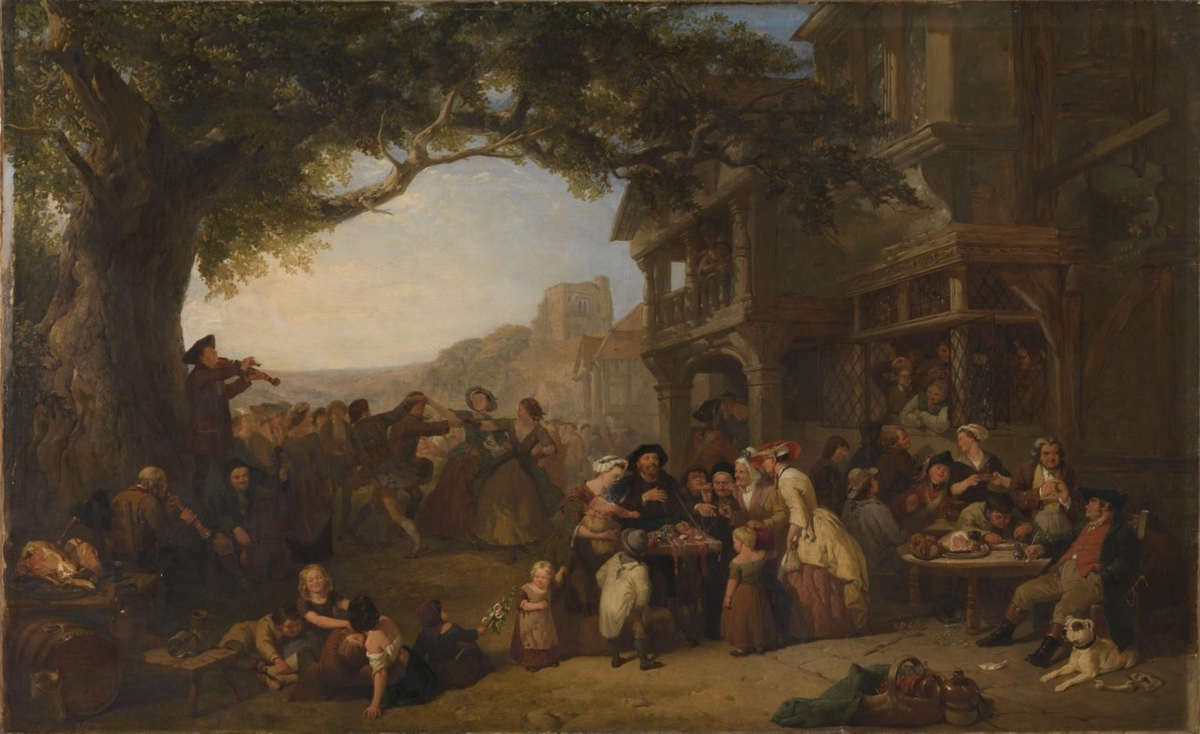
The Village Holiday by Frederick Goodall

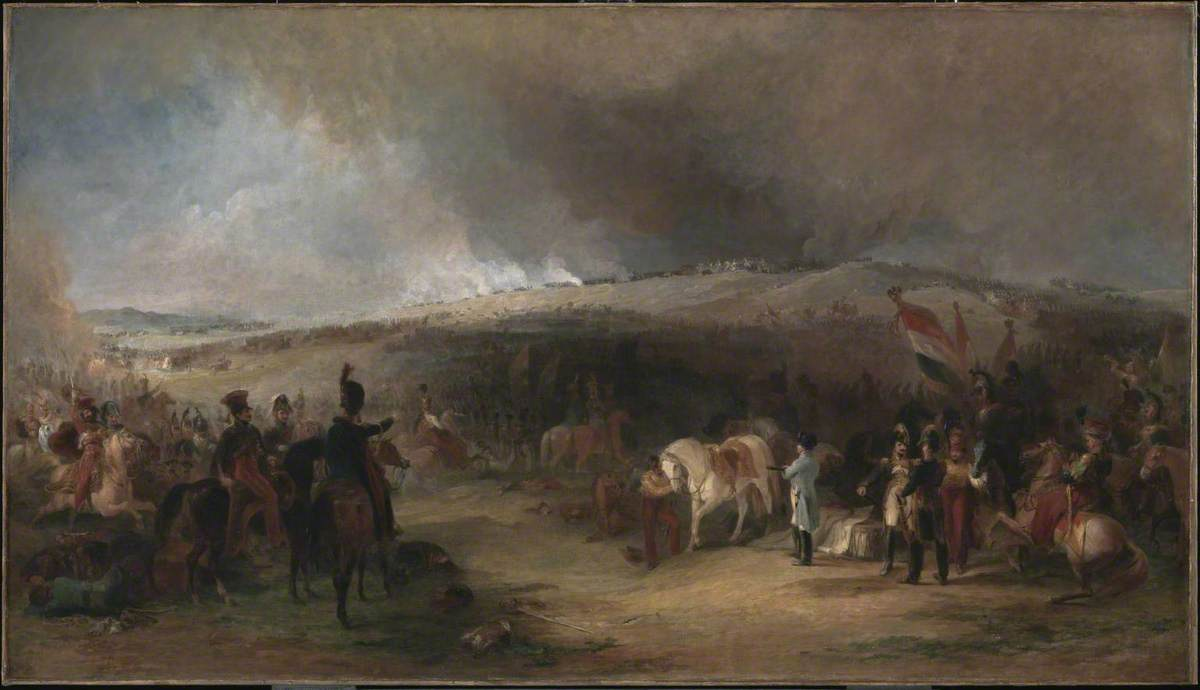
The Battle of Borodino by George Jones

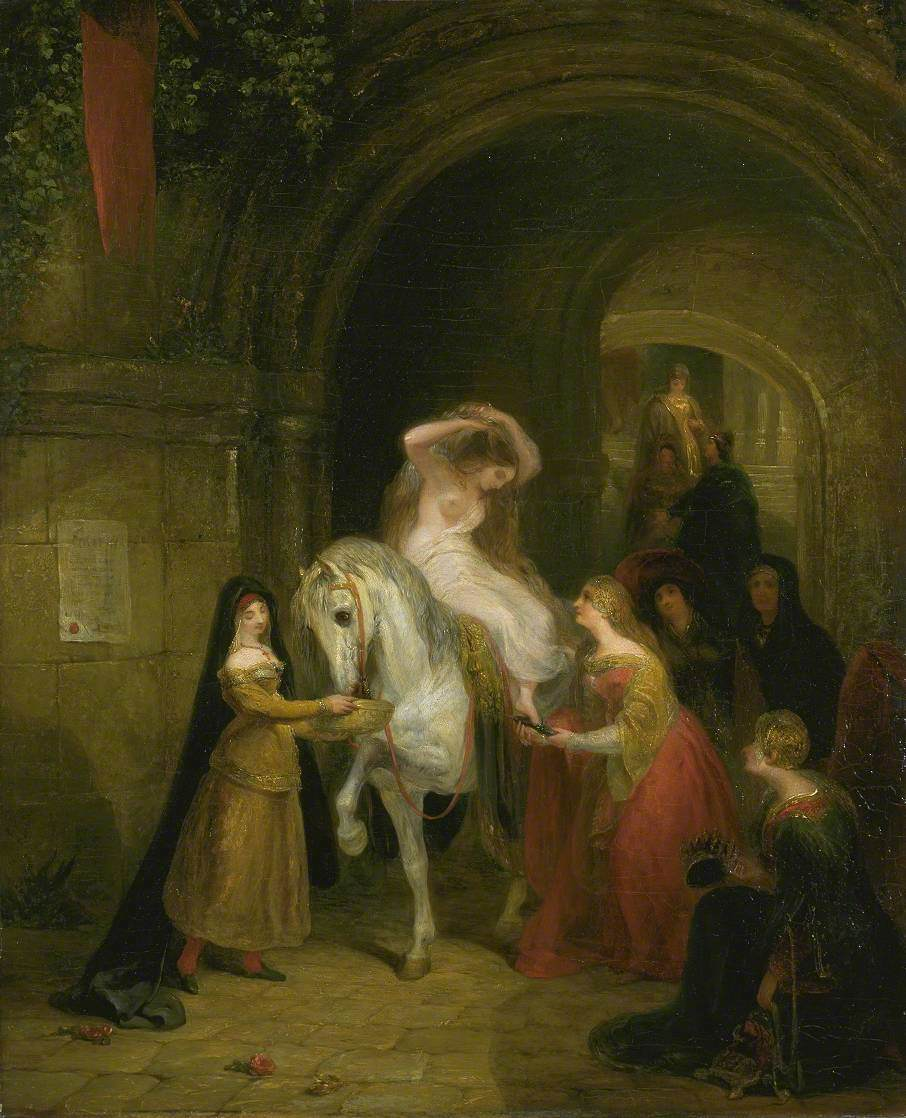
Godiva Preparing to Ride through Coventry by George Jones

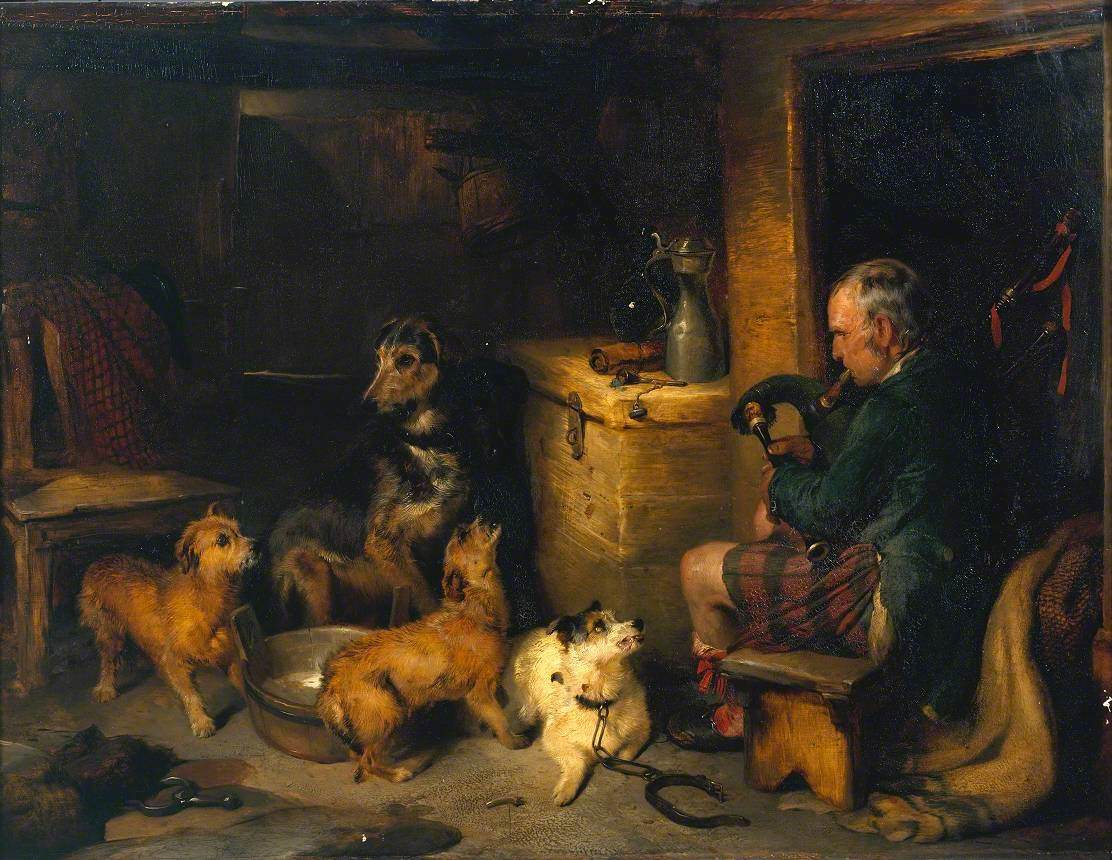
Highland Music by Edwin Landseer

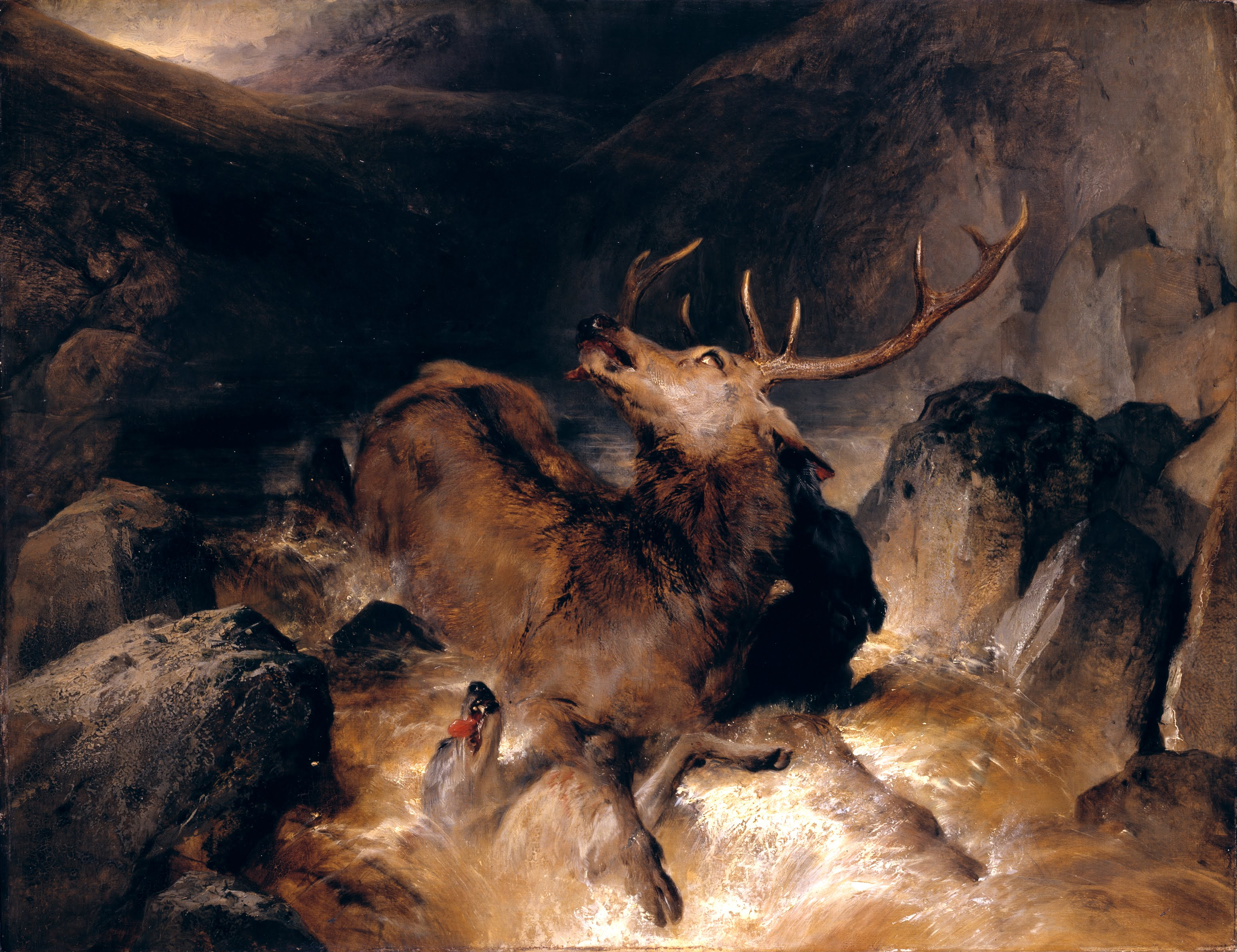
The Hunted Stag by Edwin Landseer

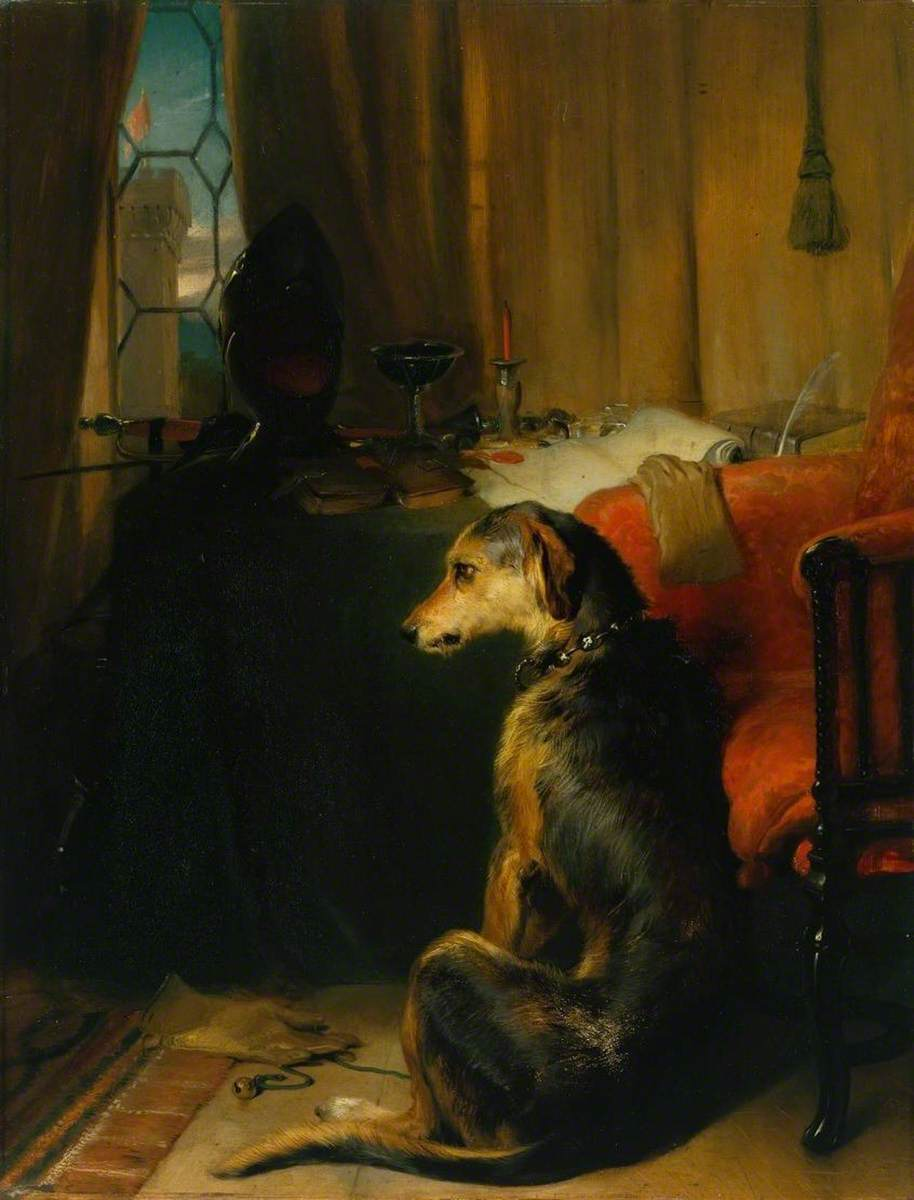
High Life by Edwin Landseer

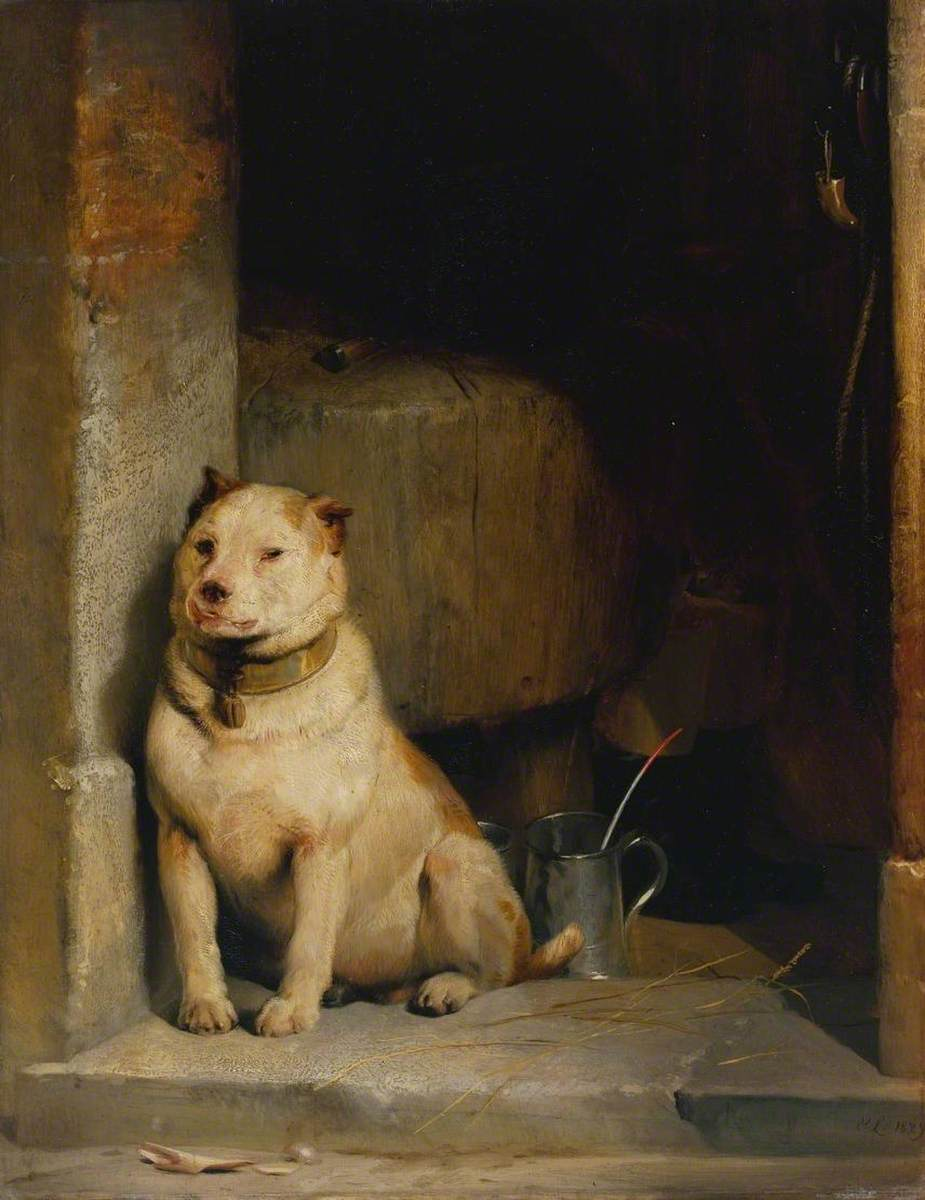
Low Life by Edwin Landseer

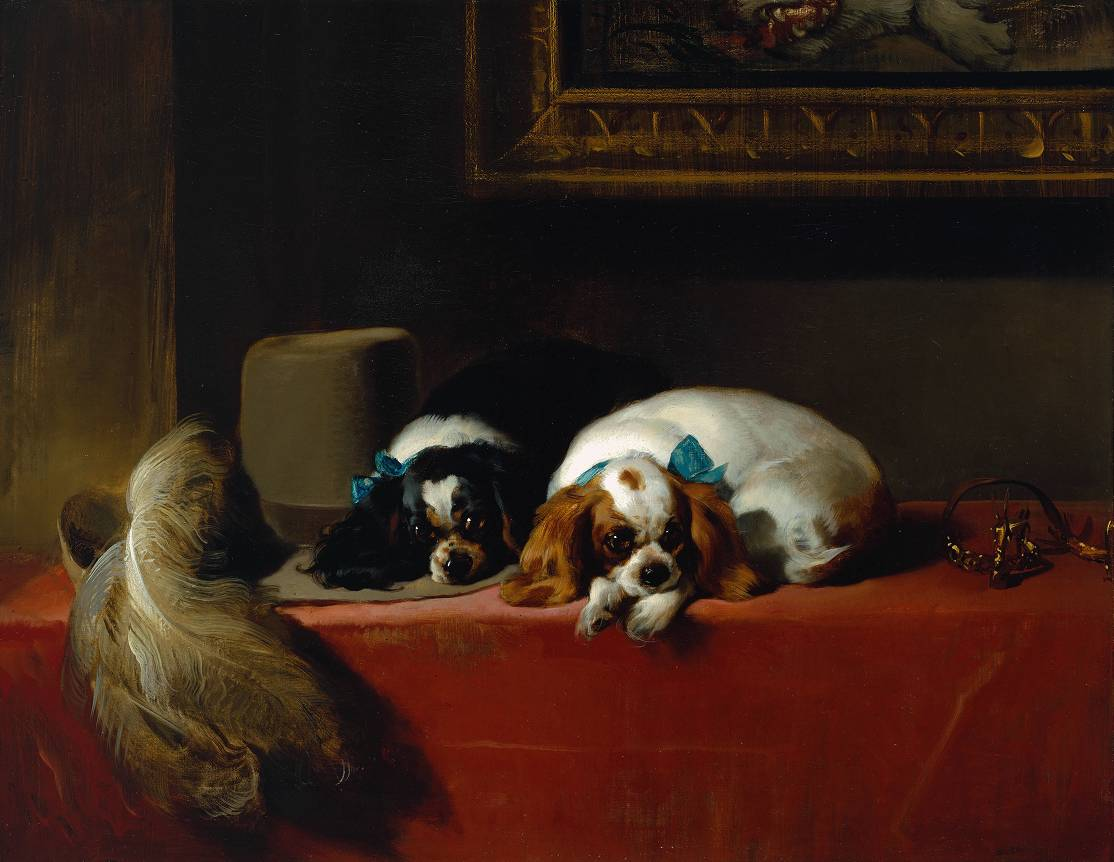
The Cavalier's Pets by Edwin Landseer

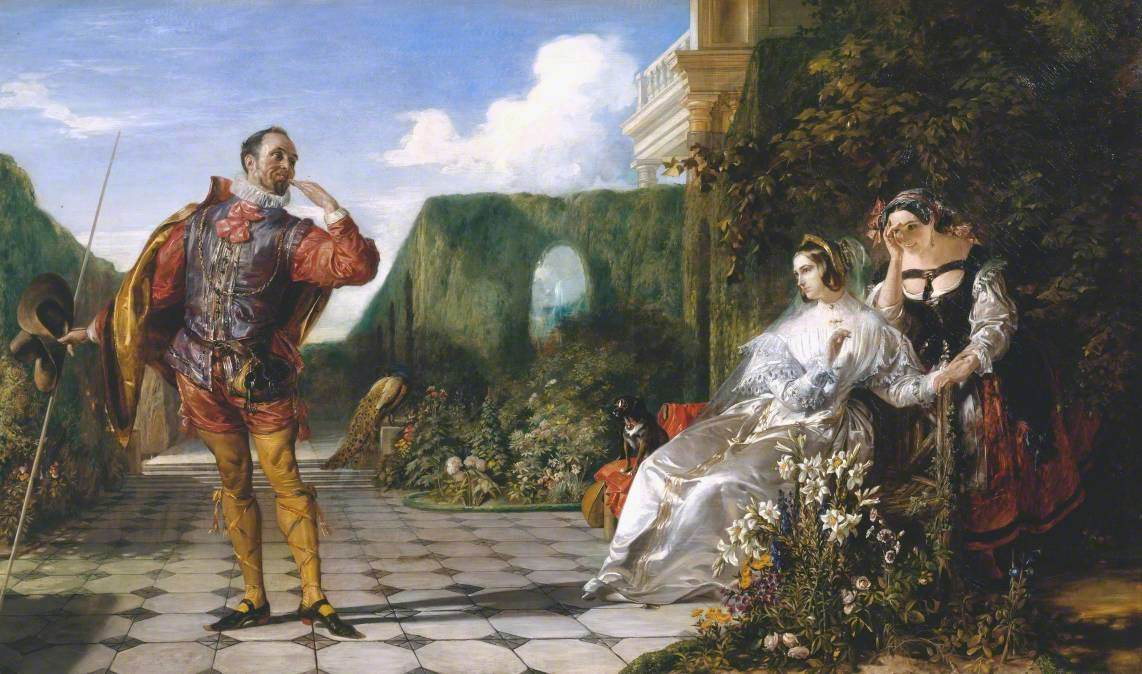
Malvolio and the Countess by Daniel Maclise

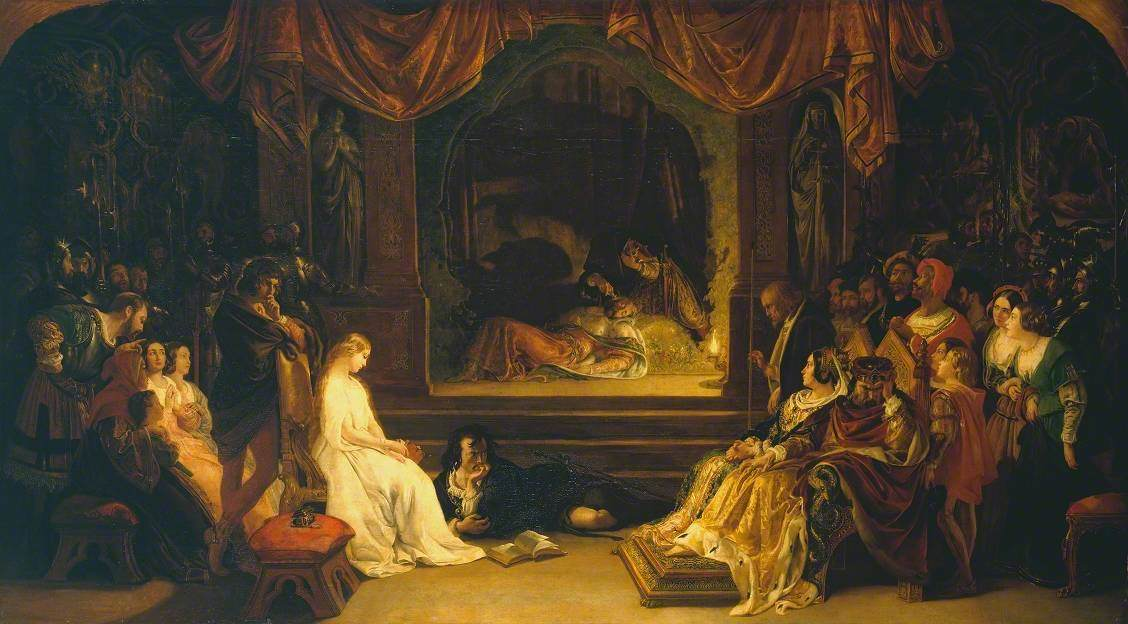
The Play Scene in Hamlet by Daniel Maclise

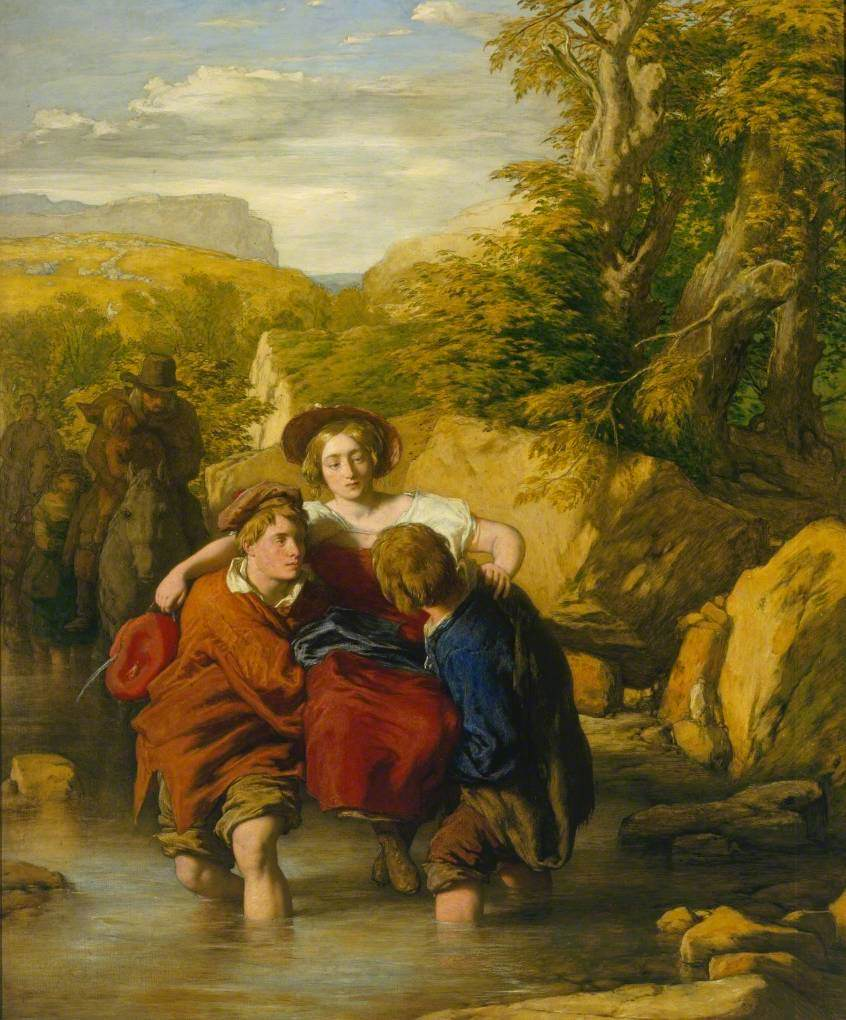
Crossing the Ford by William Mulready

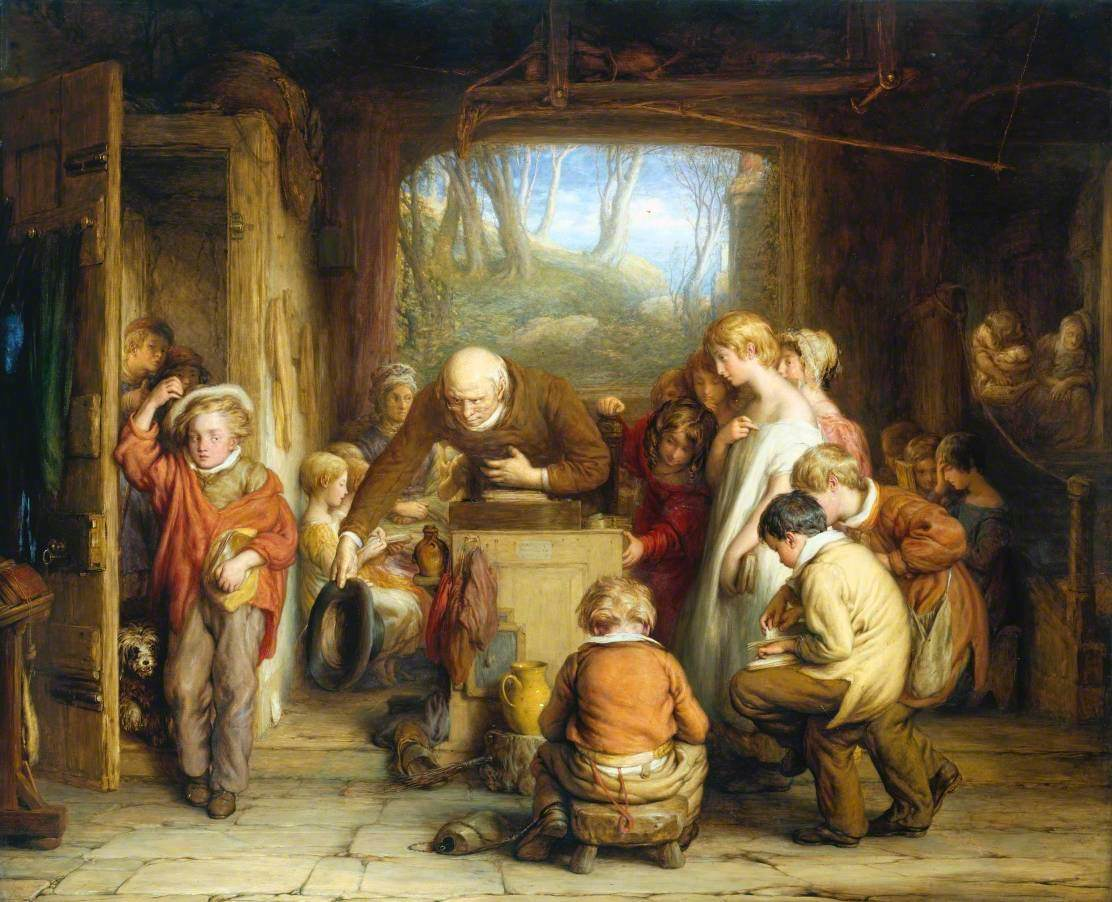
The Last In by William Mulready

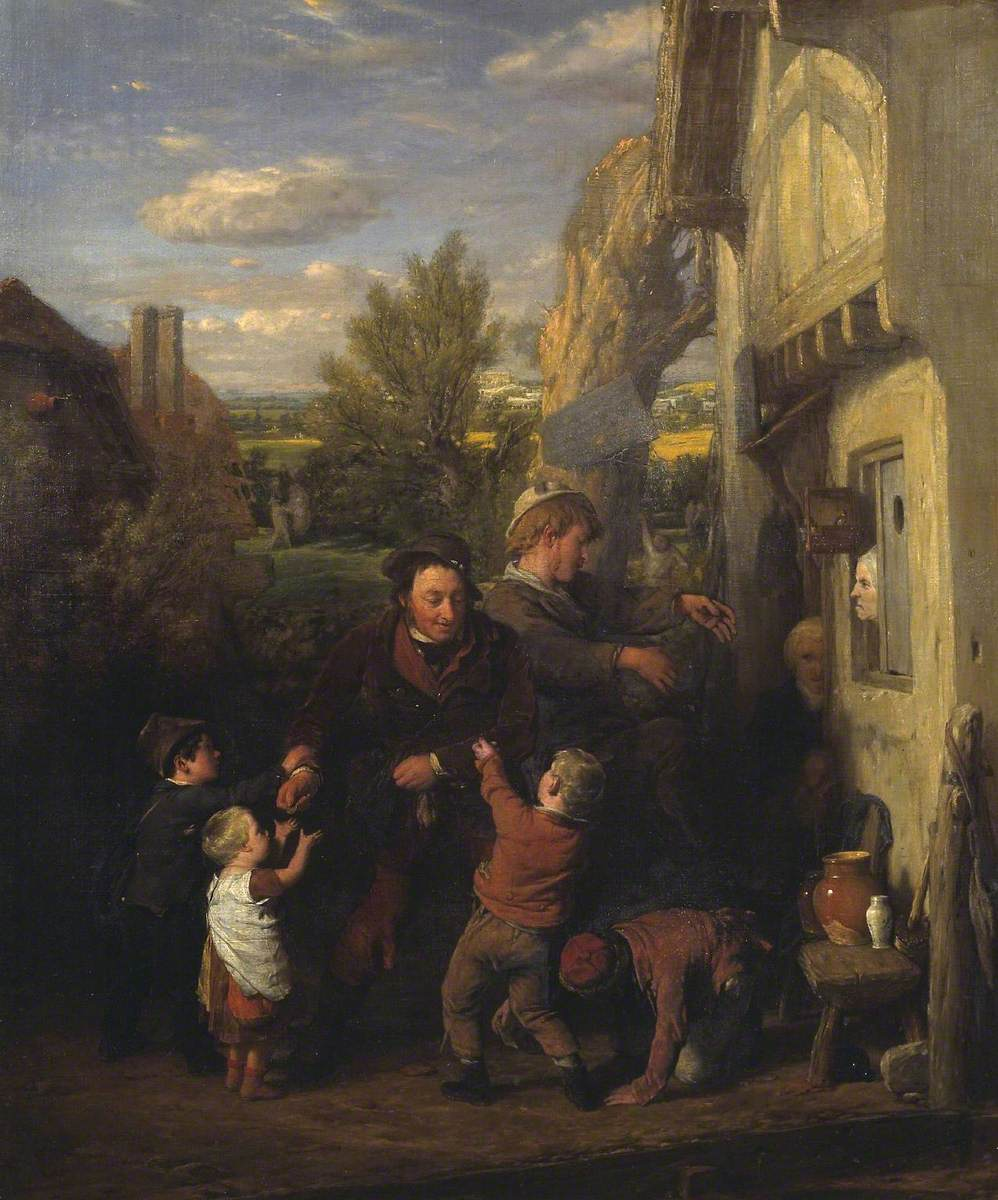
Returning from the Ale House by William Mulready

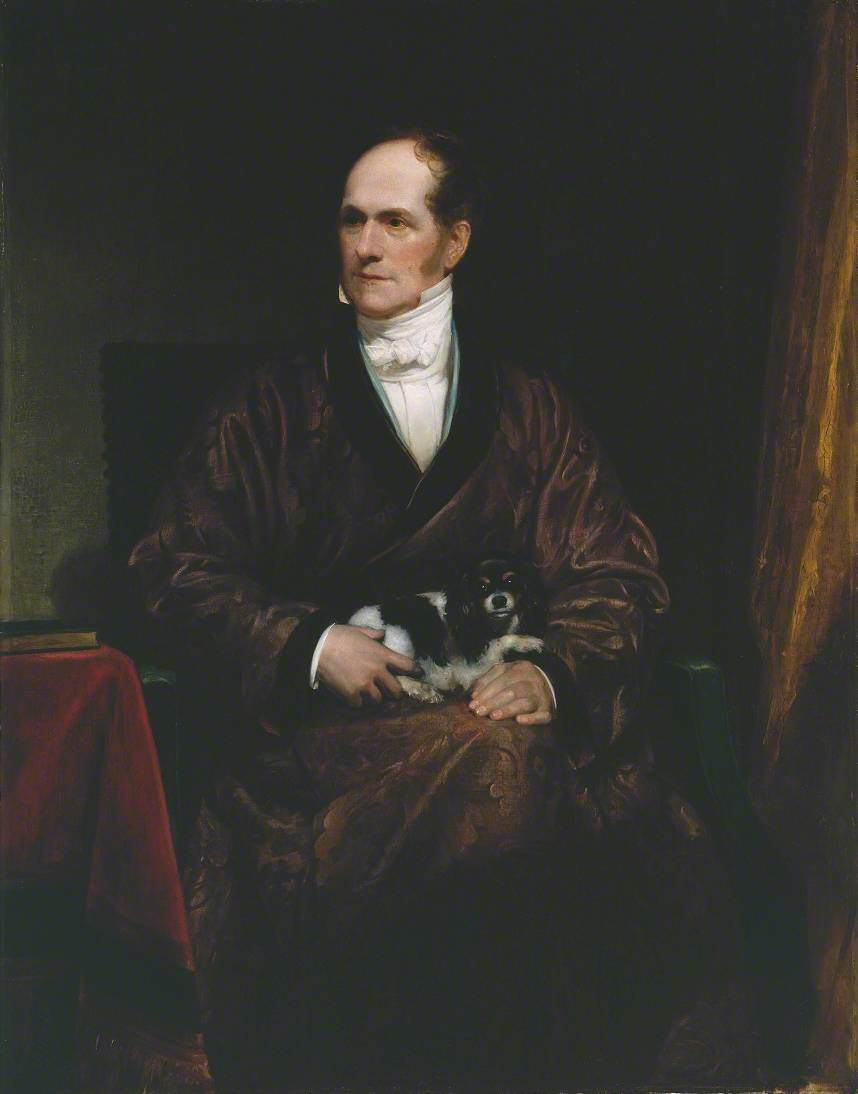
Portrait of Robert Vernon by Henry William Pickersgill

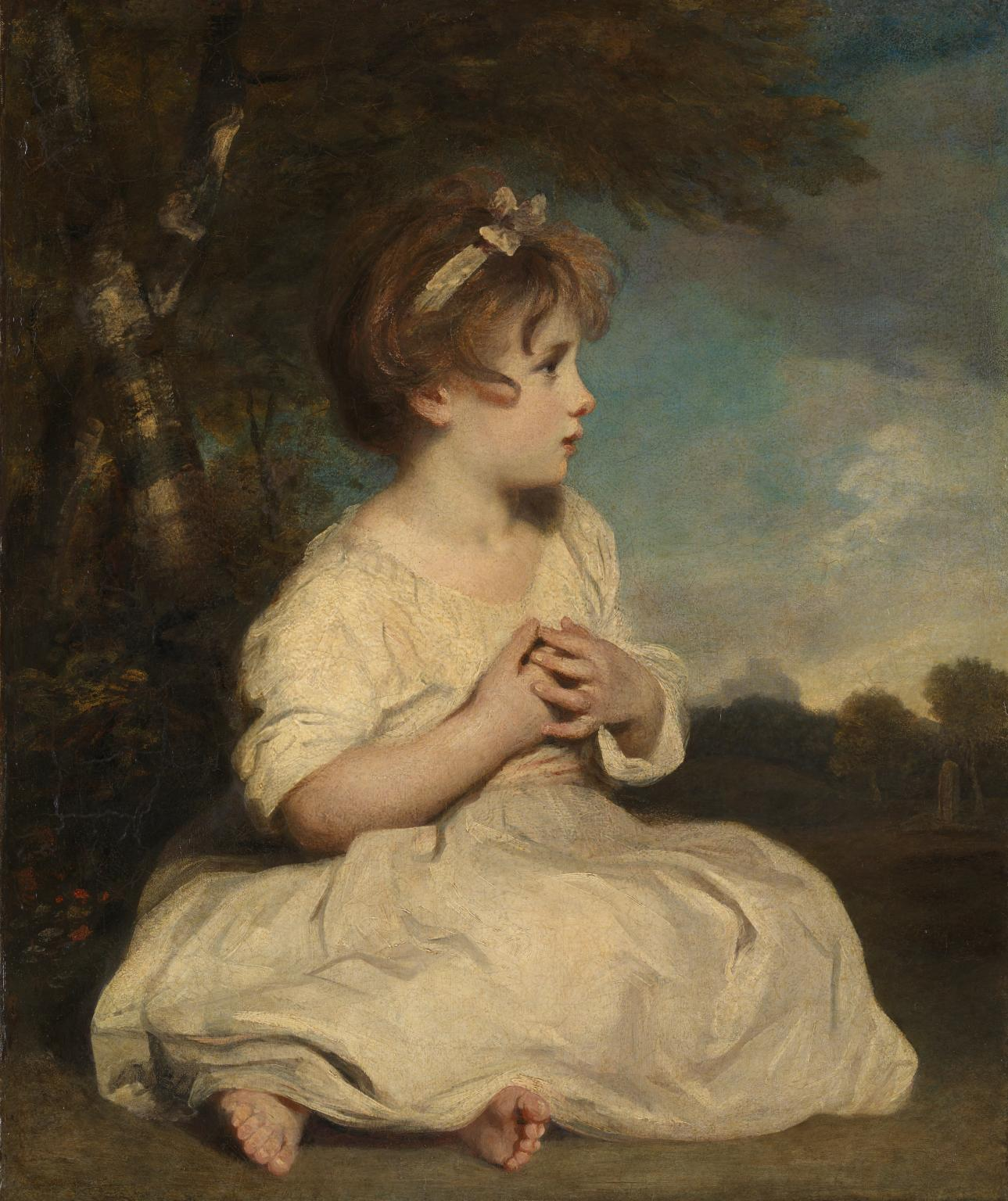
The Age of Innocence by Joshua Reynolds

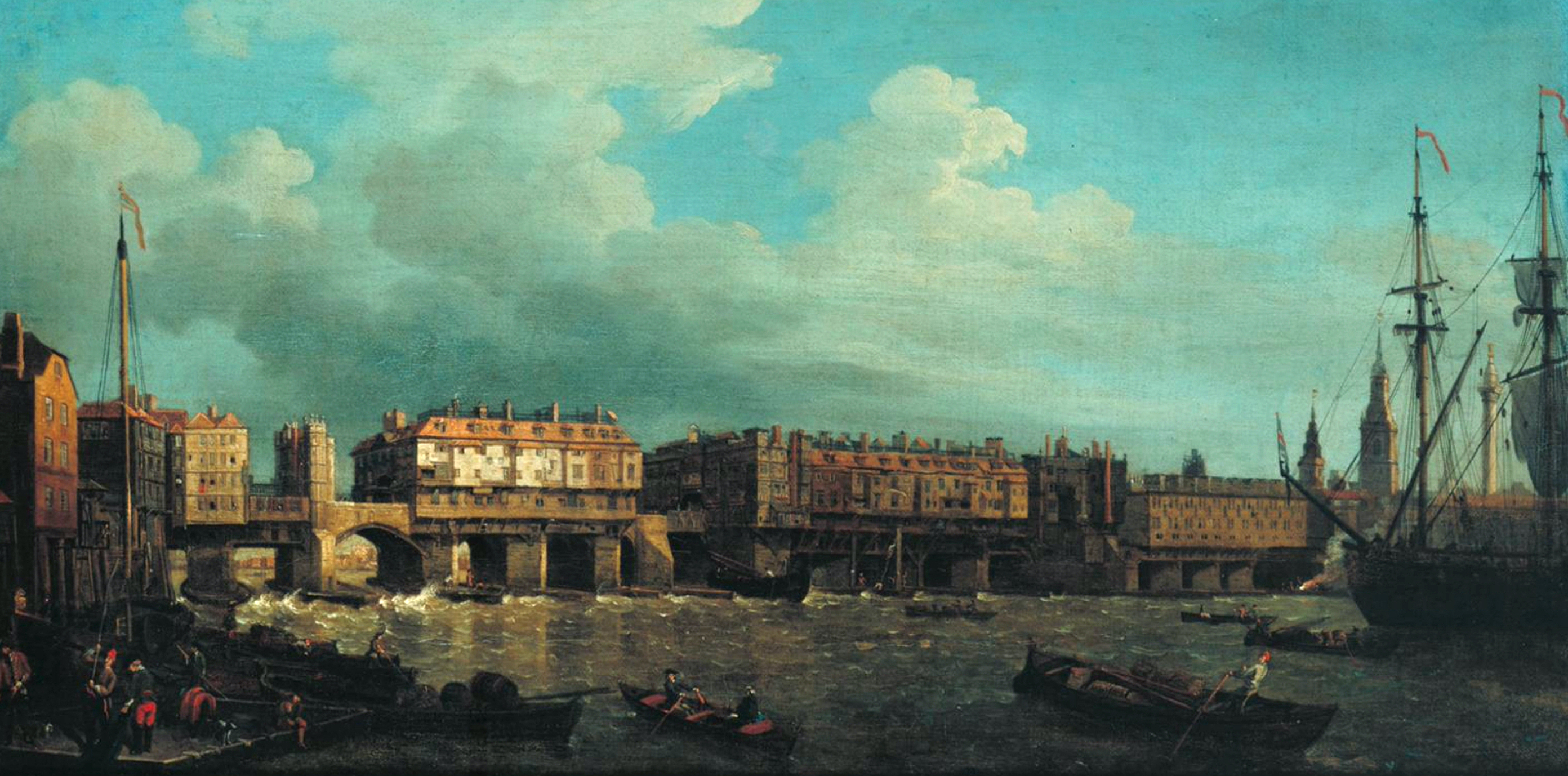
Old London Bridge by Samuel Scott

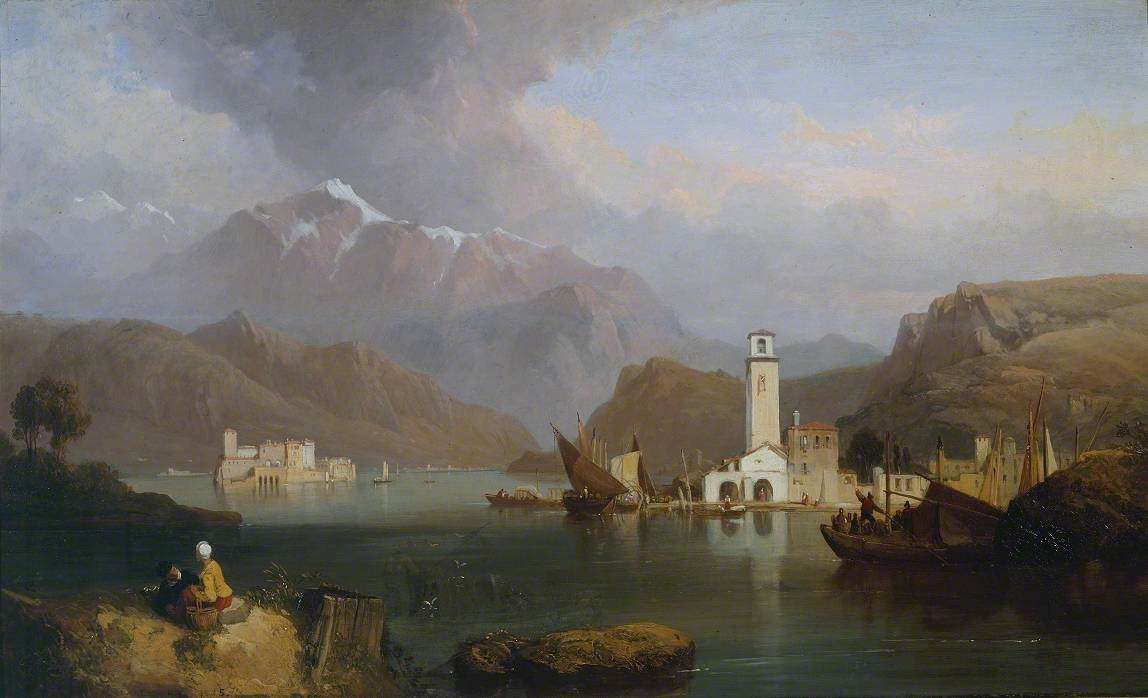
Lake Como by Clarkson Stanfield

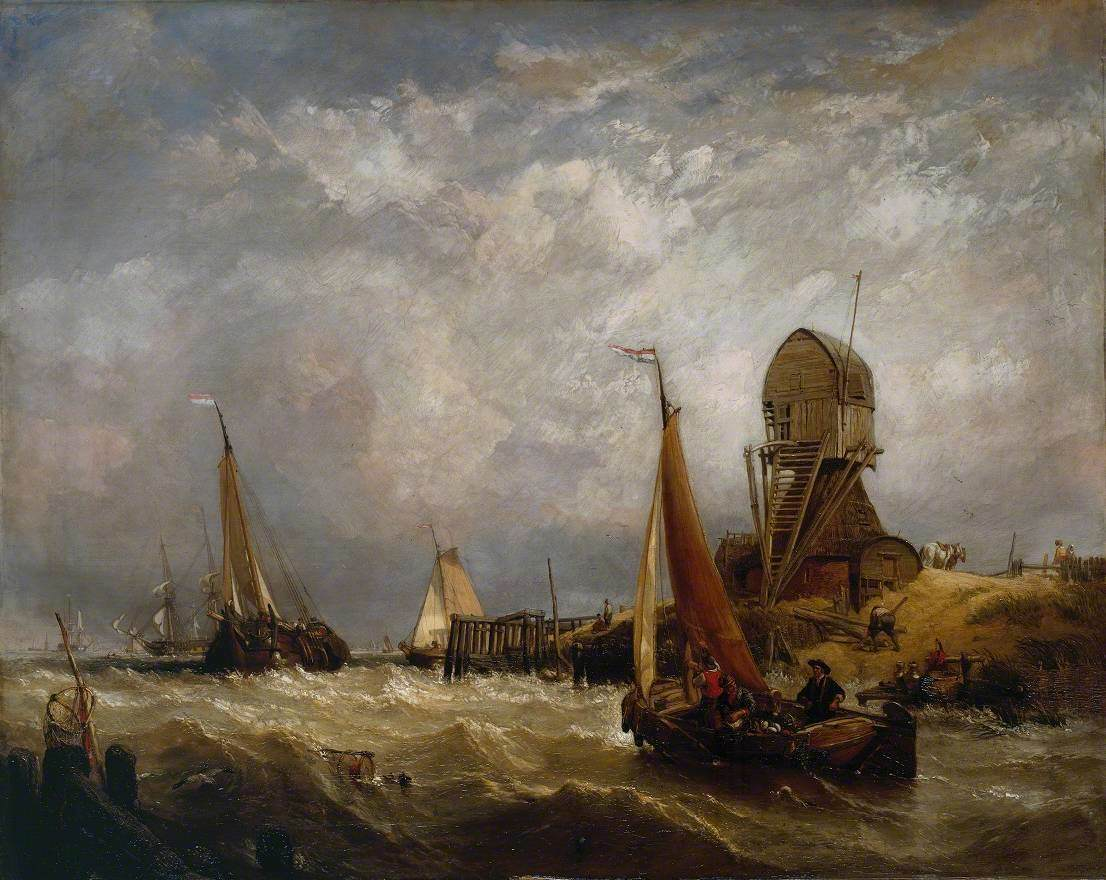
Oude Scheld – Texel Island by Clarkson Stanfield

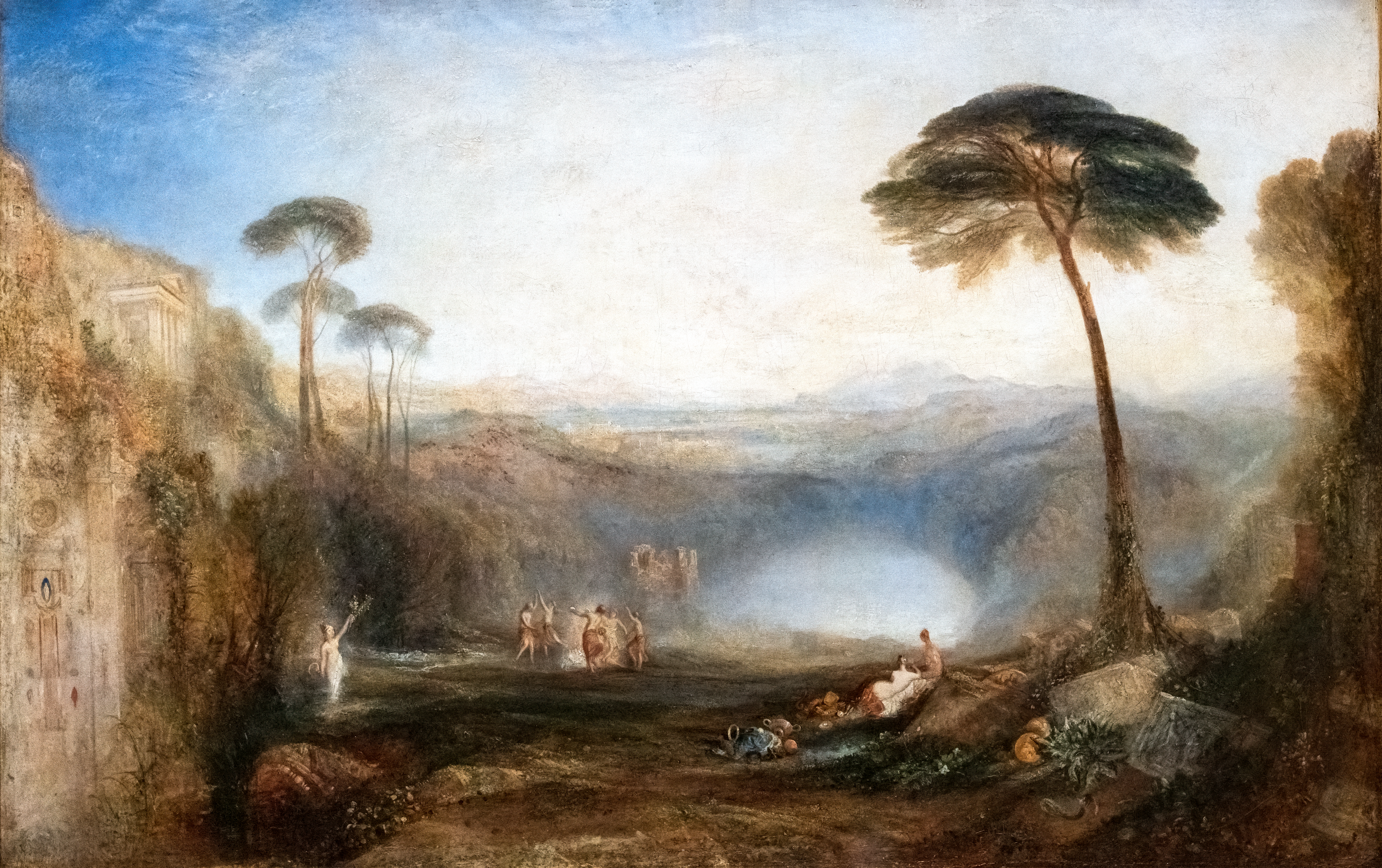
The Golden Bough by J.M.W. Turner

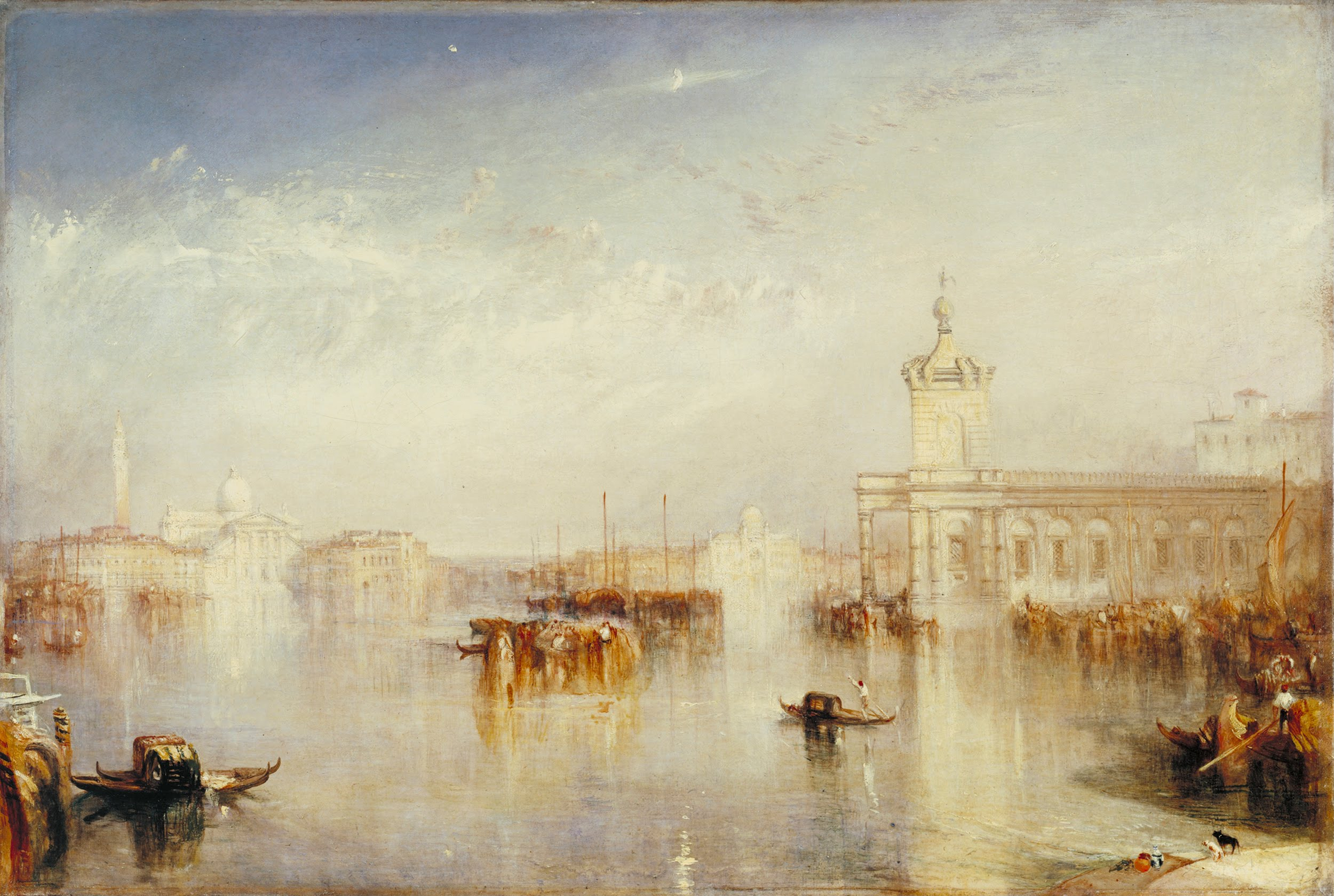
The Dogana, San Giorgio, Citella, from the Steps of the Europa by J.M.W. Turner

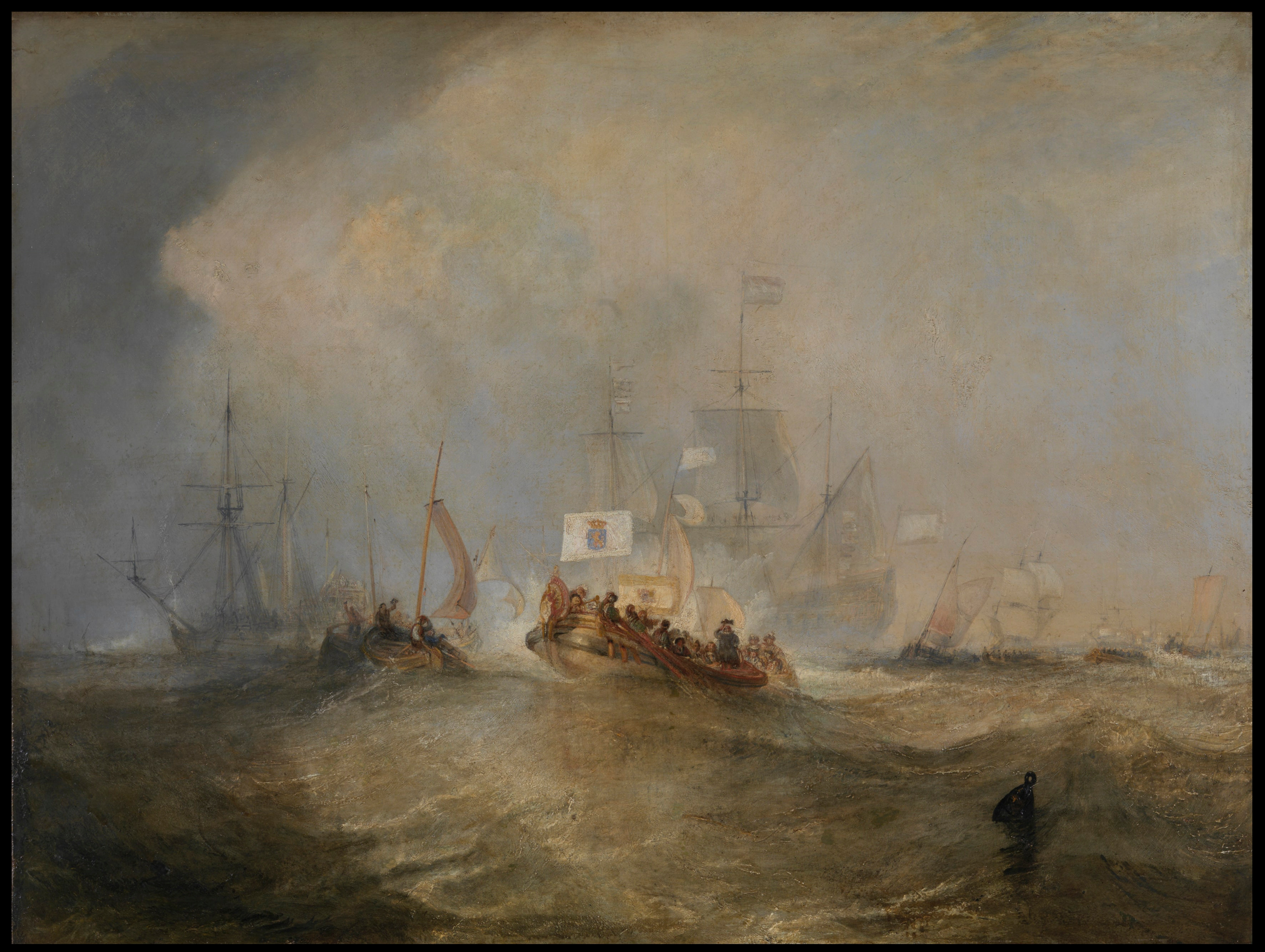
The Prince of Orange Landing at Torbay by J.M.W. Turner

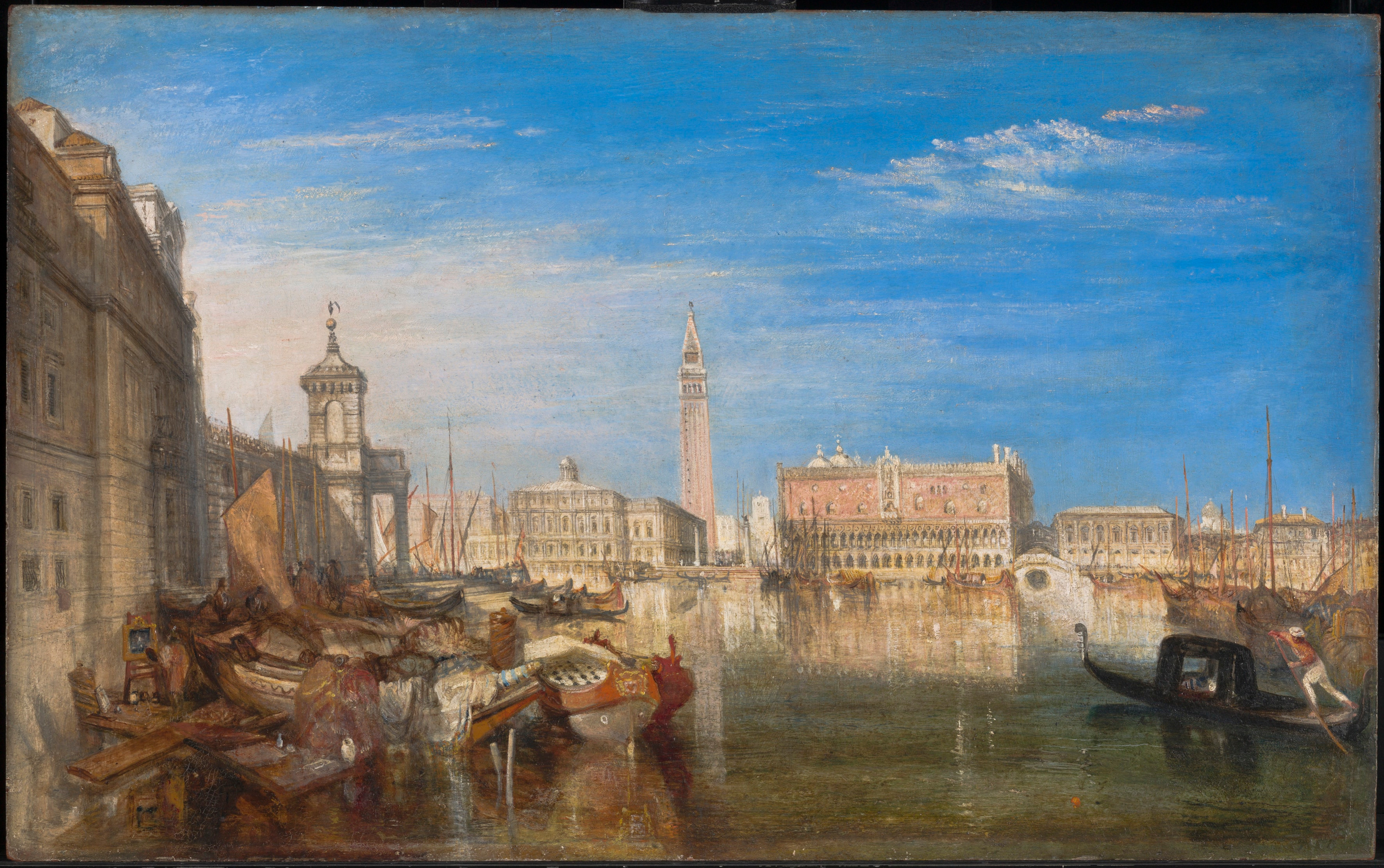
Bridge of Sighs, Ducal Palace and Custom House by J.M.W. Turner

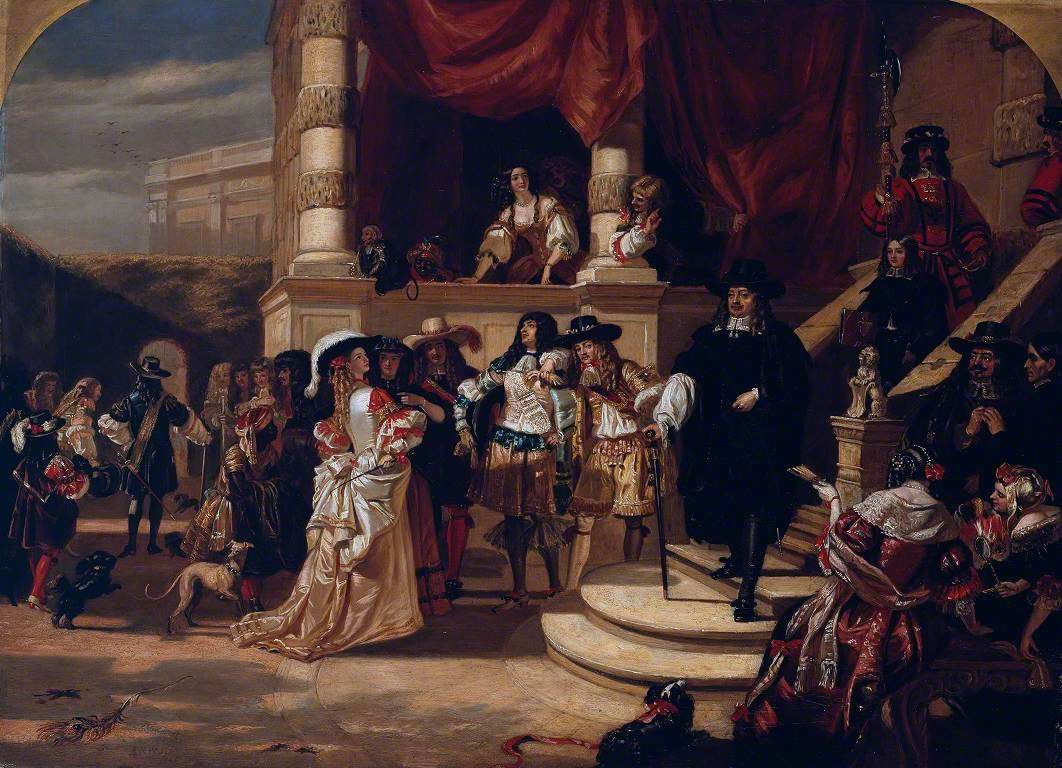
The Disgrace of Lord Clarendon by Edward Matthew Ward

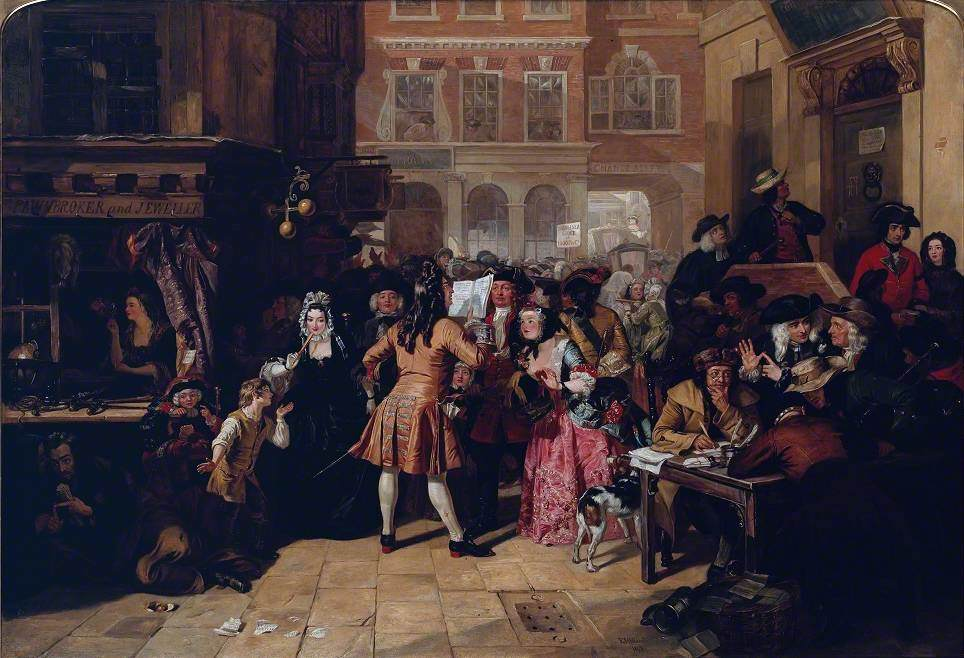
The South Sea Bubble by Edward Matthew Ward

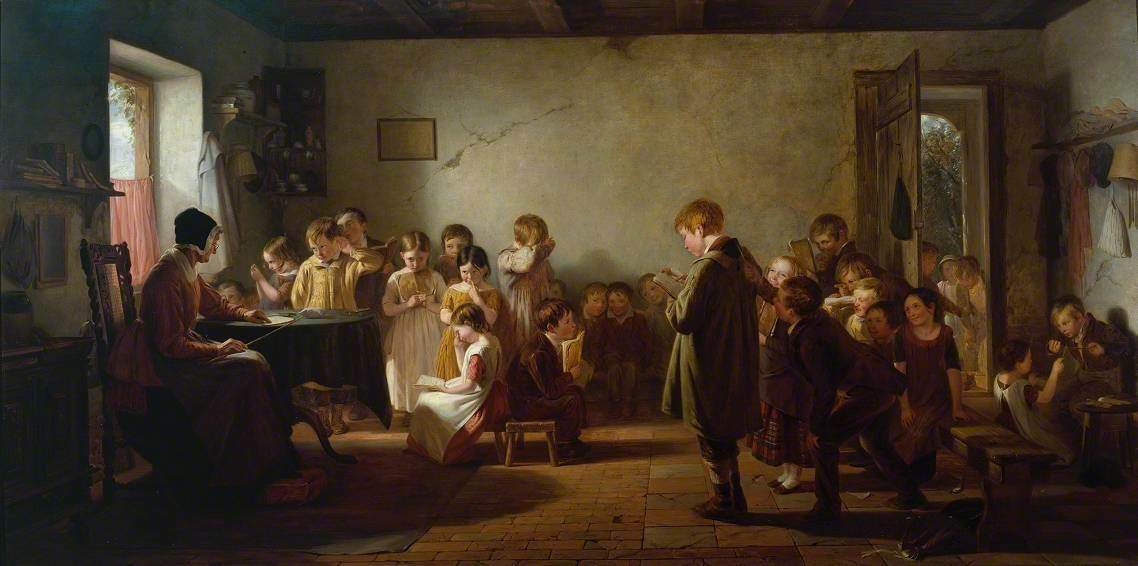
A Dame's School by Thomas Webster

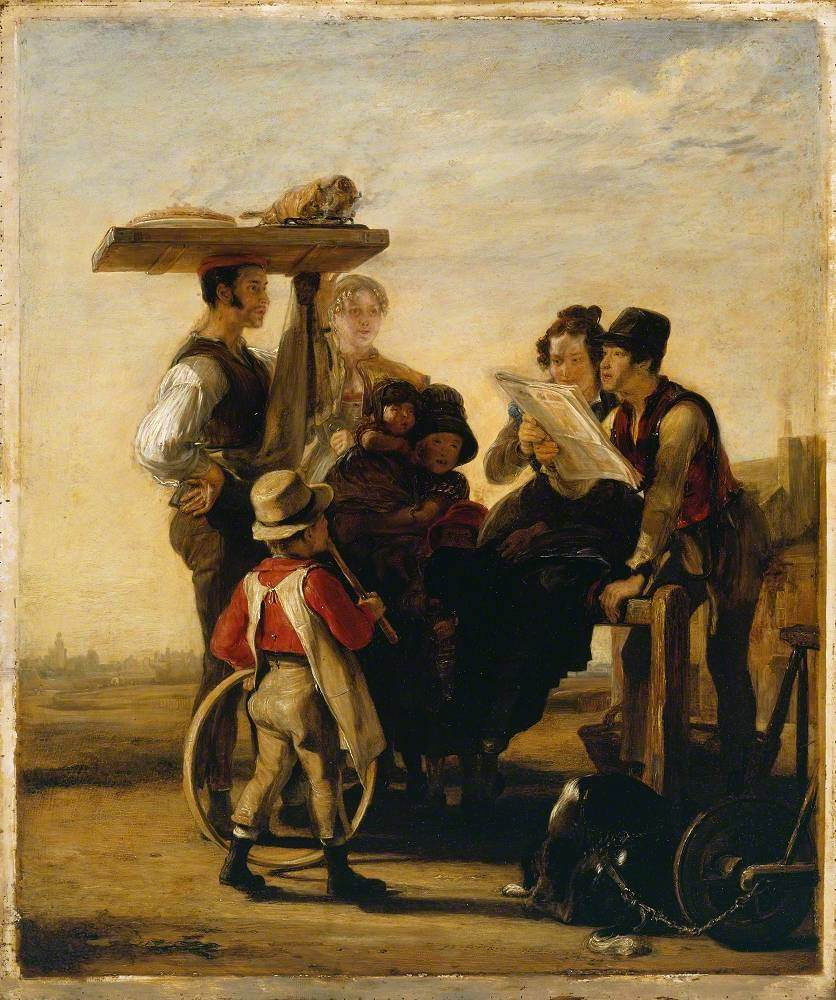
Newsmongers by David Wilkie

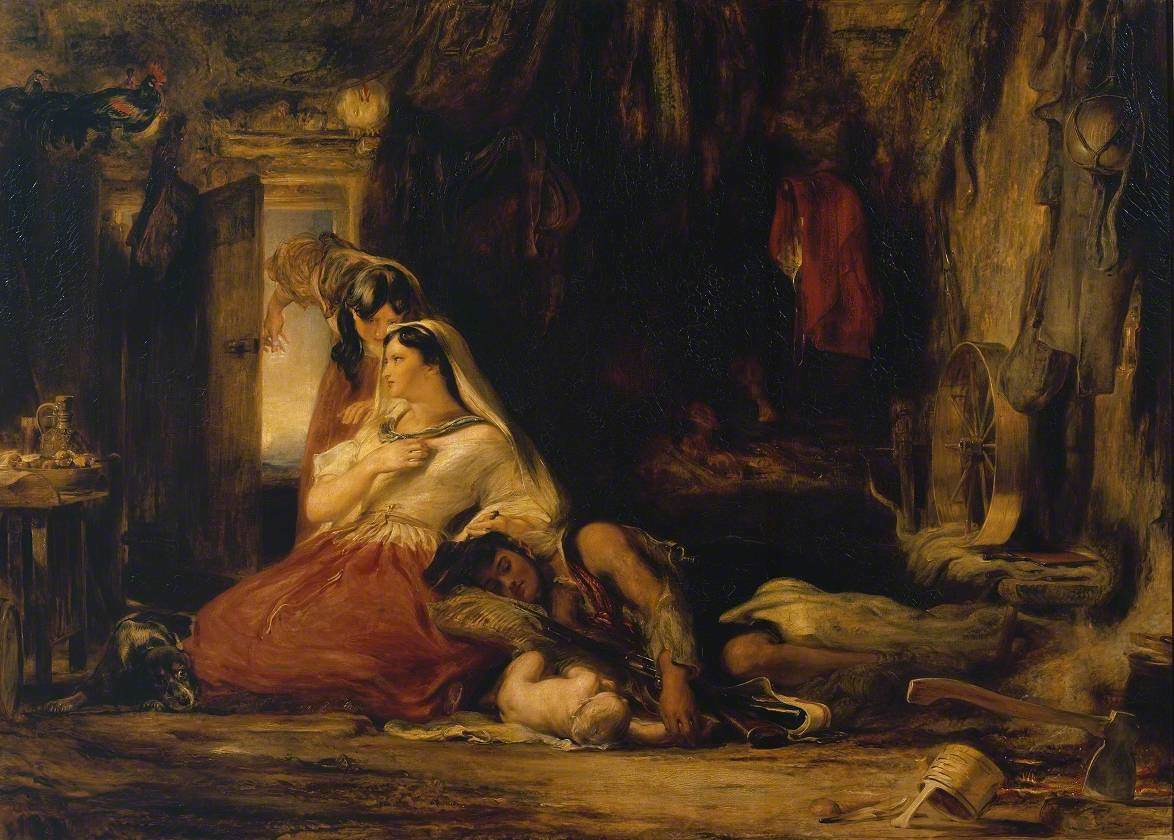
The Peep-o'-Day Boys' Cabin by David Wilkie

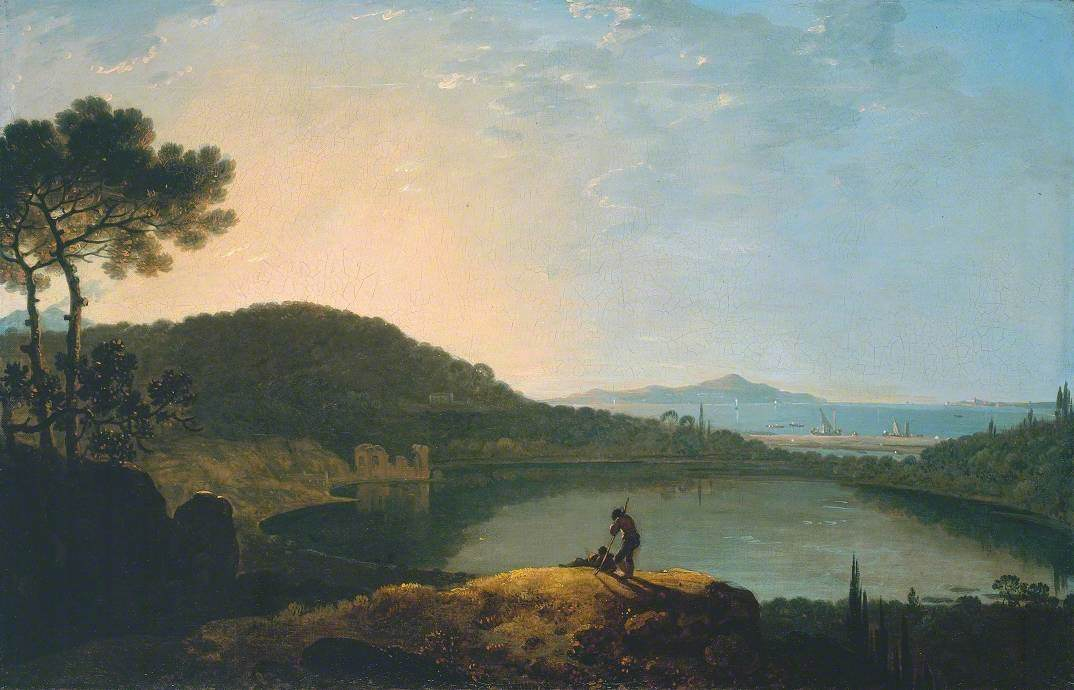
Lake Avernus and the Island of Capri by Richard Wilson

== See also ==
- Turner Bequest, a major 1851 donation enacted in 1856
- Sheepshanks Gift, a major 1857 donation to the Victoria and Albert Museum

== Bibliography ==
- Conlin, Jonathan. The Nation's Mantelpiece: A History of the National Gallery. : National Galleries of Scotland, 2006.
- Hamilton, James. A Strange Business:Making Art and Money in Nineteenth-Century Britain. Atlantic Books, 2014.
- Noon, Patrick & Bann, Stephen. Constable to Delacroix: British Art and the French Romantics. Tate, 2003.
- Poole, Andrew Geddes. Stewards of the Nation's Art: Contested Cultural Authority 1890–1939. University of Toronto Press, 2010.
