= 1828 in art =

Events in the year 1828 in Art.

== Events ==
- December 3 – The Musée Fabre opens in the refurbished Hôtel de Massillian in Montpellier, France.
- January 1 – The Yankee magazine is founded by art critic John Neal.

== Works ==
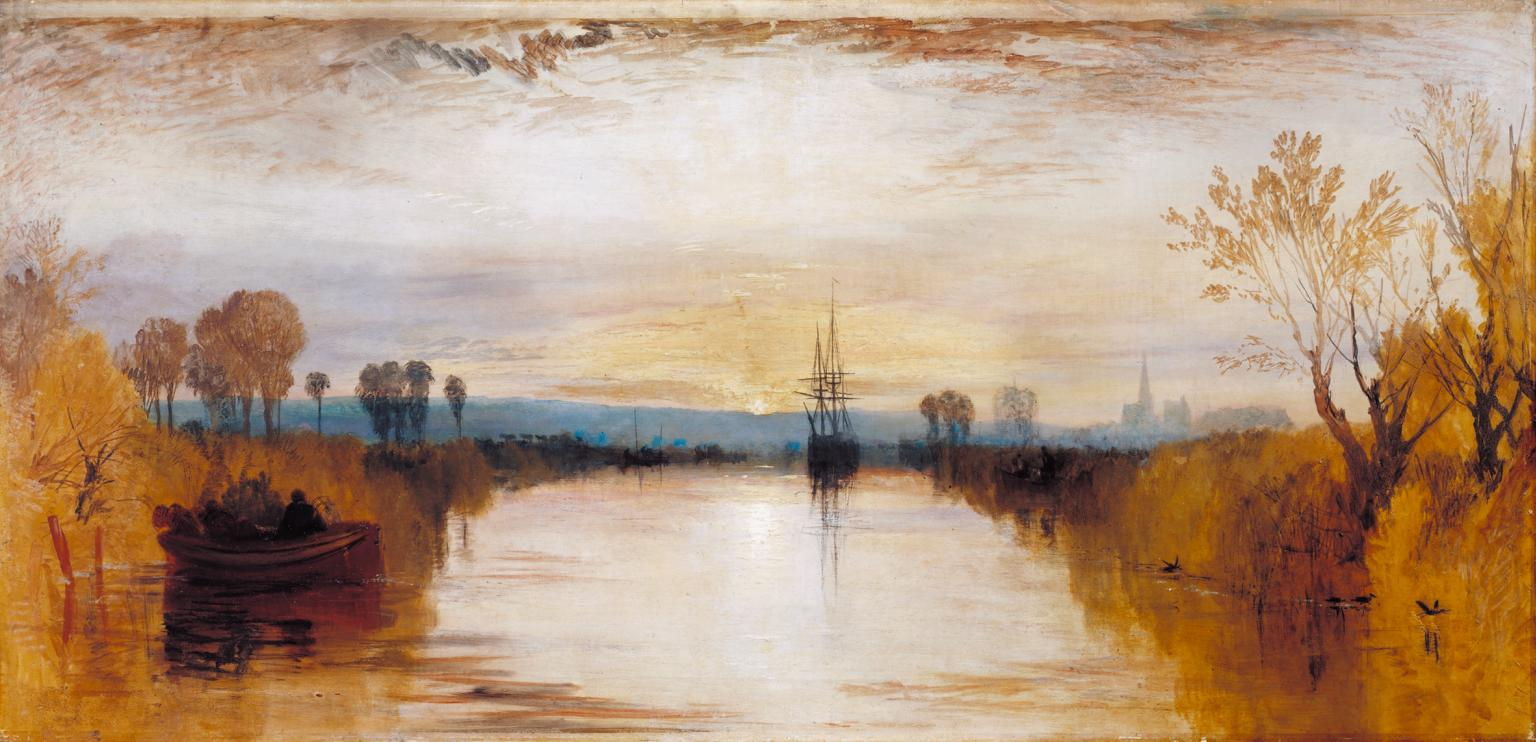
Turner – Chichester Canal

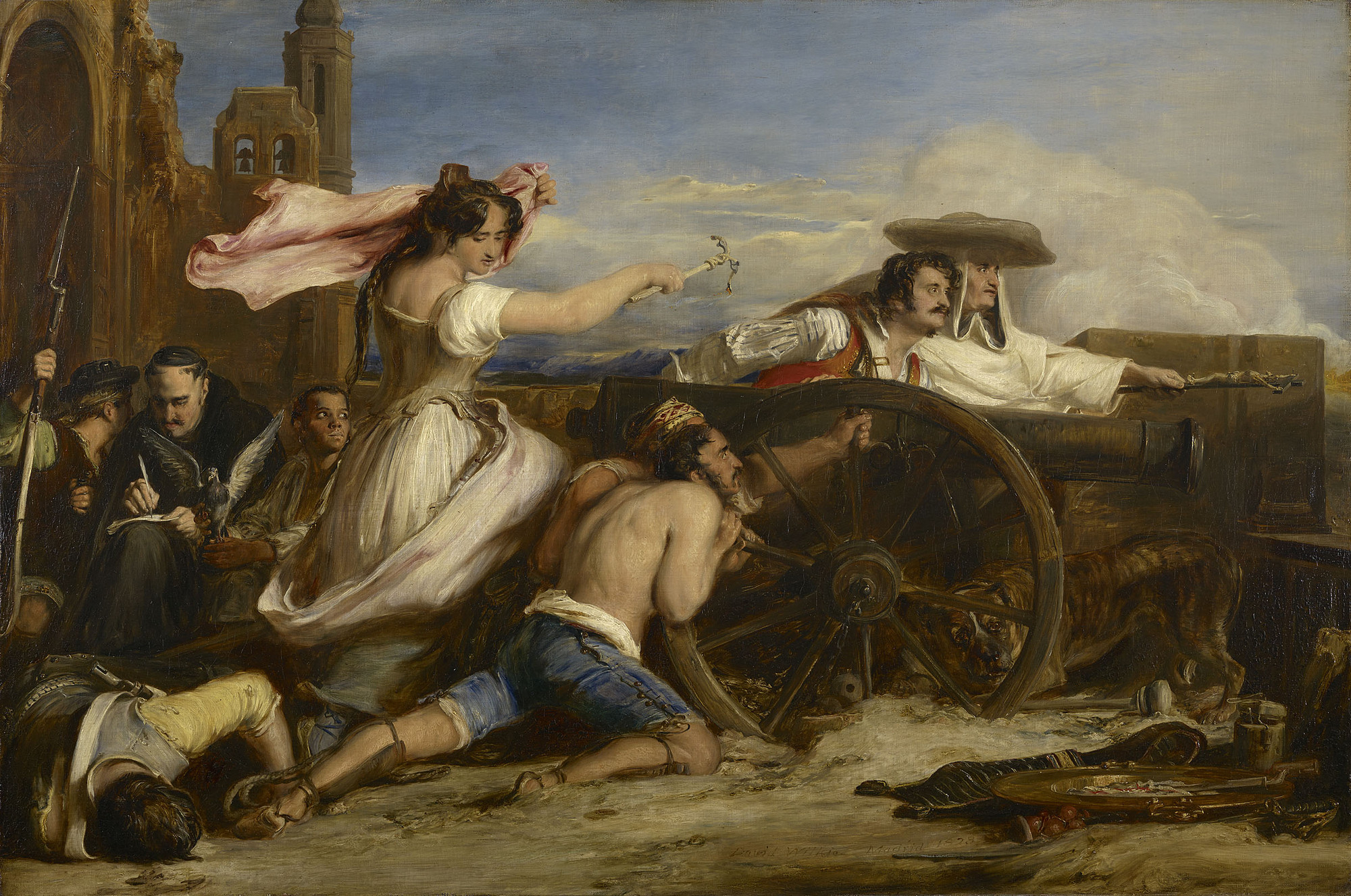
The Defence of Saragossa by David Wilkie

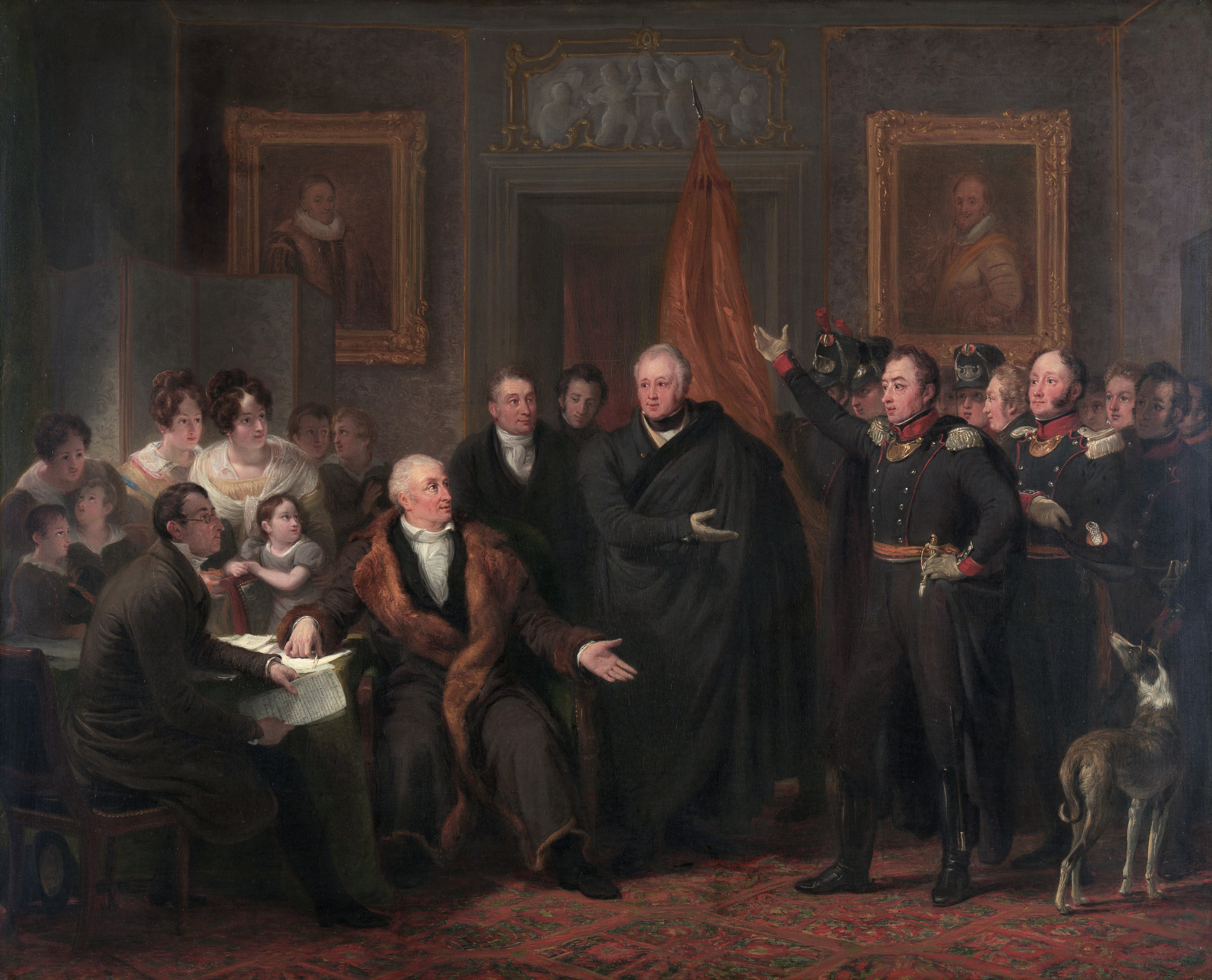
The Triumvirate Assuming Power on Behalf of the Prince of Orange by Jan Willem Pieneman.

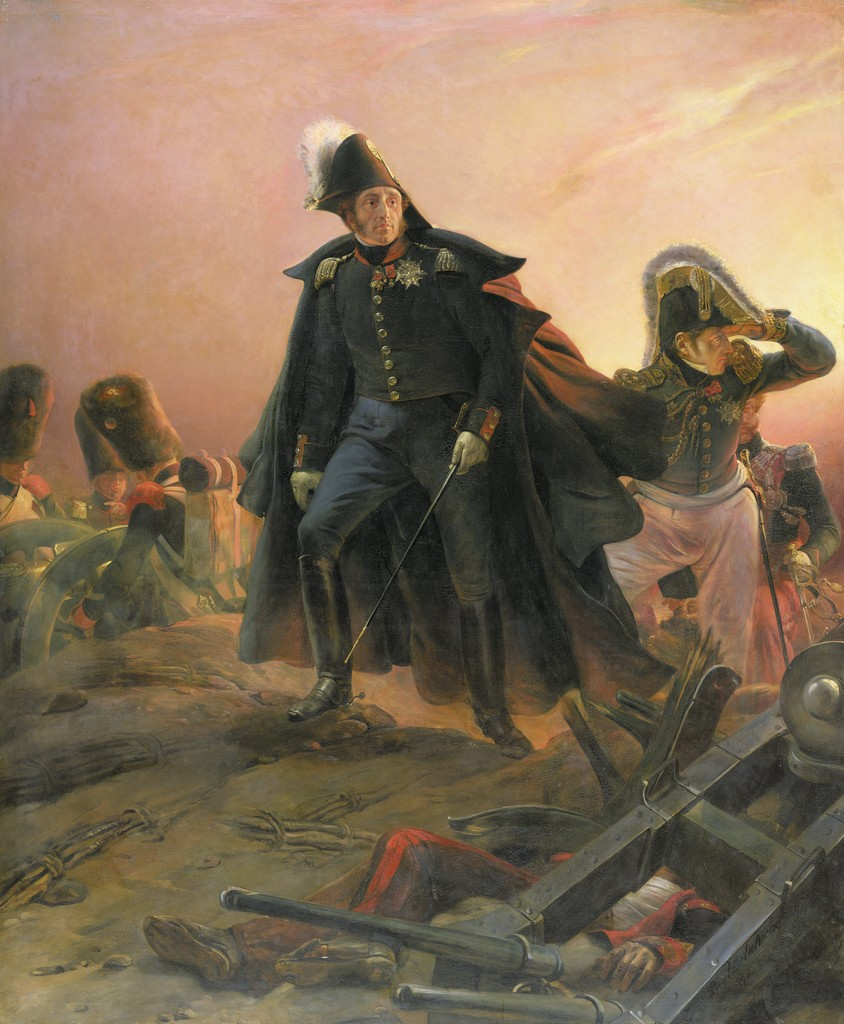
The Duke of Angoulême at the Taking of Trocadero by Paul Delaroche.

- José Aparicio – The Landing of Ferdinand VII in El Puerto de Santa María
- Henry Perronet Briggs – Visit of George III to Howe's Flagship the Queen Charlotte
- John Constable – The Vale of Dedham
- George Dawe – Portrait of the Duke of Cumberland
- Paul Delaroche – The Duke of Angoulême at the Taking of Trocadero
- William Etty
  - The Dawn of Love
  - The World Before the Flood
- Caspar David Friedrich - Ships in Harbour, Evening
- Sarah Goodridge – Beauty Revealed
- Orest Kiprensky – Self-portrait
- August Kopisch – The Crater of Vesuvius with the Eruption of 1828
- Thomas Lawrence – Portrait of Charles Grey, 2nd Earl Grey
- James Arthur O'Connor – View on the Shannon, with figures in a rowing boat
- Rembrandt Peale – Self-portrait
- Jan Willem Pieneman – The Triumvirate Assuming Power on Behalf of the Prince of Orange
- George Philip Reinagle – The Battle of Navarino
- Joseph Karl Stieler – Charlotte von Hagn (for Schönheitengalerie at Nymphenburg Palace)
- John Trumbull - The Capture of the Hessians at Trenton, December 26, 1776
- Horace Vernet
  - The Brigand Betrayed
  - The Battle of Fontenoy
- Walenty Wańkowicz – Portrait of Adam Mickiewicz
- James Ward – Venus Rising from her Couch
- David Wilkie
  - The Defence of Saragossa
  - The Spanish Posada
  - Washington Irving in the Archives of Seville

== Births ==
- February 11 – Emily Mary Osborn, English painter (died 1925)
- March 28 – Étienne Carjat, French caricaturist and portrait photographer (died 1906)
- March 30 – François Bocion, Swiss architect and painter (died 1890)
- April 1 – George Barbu Știrbei, Romanian patron of the arts (died 1925)
- May 10 – James McDougal Hart, Scottish-born painter of the Hudson River School (died 1901)
- May 12 – Dante Gabriel Rossetti, English Pre-Raphaelite painter and poet (died 1882)
- May 21 – Rudolf Koller, Swiss painter (died 1905)
- June 13 – Jules-Élie Delaunay, French academic painter (died 1891)
- June 20 – John Wharlton Bunney, English Pre-Raphaelite topographical and landscape painter (died 1882)
- July 9 – Adolf Schreyer, German painter (died 1899)
- July 14 – Jervis McEntee, American painter of the Hudson River School (died 1891)
- July 30 – Paul Gachet, French physician to artists, Impressionist art collector and amateur painter (died 1909)
- November 2 – Edward Mitchell Bannister, African American Tonalist painter (died 1901)
- date unknown
  - Pietro Pezzati, Italian painter of church murals (died 1890)
  - Jan Wnęk, Polish carpenter and sculptor (died 1869)

== Deaths ==
- January 1 – Johann Samuel Arnhold, German painter in oil and water-colours, and on porcelain and enamel (born 1766)
- January 4 – Sakai Hōitsu, Japanese painter of the Rinpa school (born 1748)
- January 23 – Giuseppe Quaglio, Italian painter and stage designer (born 1747)
- February 28 – Simon Charles Miger, French engraver (born 1736)
- April 16 – Francisco Goya, Spanish painter (born 1746)
- May 8 – Christian August Lorentzen, Danish painter (born 1746)
- May 28 – Anne Seymour Damer, English sculptor (born 1749)
- July 9 – Gilbert Stuart, American painter (born 1755)
- July 15 – Jean Antoine Houdon, French neoclassical sculptor (born 1741)
- September 28 – Richard Parkes Bonington, English landscape painter (born 1802)
- November 8 – Thomas Bewick, English engraver (born 1753)
- November 17 – Franz Caucig, Slovene painter and drawer (born 1755)
- date unknown
  - William Billingsley, English painter of porcelain (born 1758)
  - Thomas Kerrich, English clergyman, antiquary, draughtsman and gifted amateur artist (born 1761)
  - Wilhelmina Krafft, Swedish painter and portrait miniaturist (born 1778)
  - Giuseppe Levati, Italian painter and designer in the Neoclassicist style (born 1739)
  - John Webb, English landscape designer (born 1754)
