= Fanny Kemble and Sarah Siddons =

Painting by Henry Perronet Briggs

- Artist: Henry Perronet Briggs
- Year: 1830
- Type: Oil on canvas, portrait painting
- Dimensions: 143.5 cm × 113.3 cm (56.5 in × 44.6 in)
- Location: Boston Athenæum, Boston

Fanny Kemble and Sarah Siddons is an oil on canvas portrait painting by the British artist Henry Perronet Briggs, from 1830.

== History and description ==
It is a dual portrait of the stage actresses Fanny Kemble and her aunt Sarah Siddons, both noted for their Shakespearian roles. Siddons was the most celebrated tragedienne of her era. When she sat for the painting she had retired from the state for more than a decade. Fanny, around twenty in the picture, was the daughter of the actor Charles Kemble, the brother of Siddons. She later became a supporter of abolitionism. The painting was displayed at the Royal Academy Exhibition of 1832 at Somerset House. Kemble gifted the painting to the Boston Athenæum library in Massachusetts in 1863.

A theme of the painting is the dynastic transfer of genius between the two women. Siddons is seated with a book, a pose that recalls noted portraits of her by Gainsborough and Reynolds as well as her celebrated dramatic readings. The painting refers to Kemble's recent success as Juliet in Shakespeare's play with Siddons fulfilling the role of Nurse. Nonetheless, its she who is the central focus of the composition rather than her much younger niece.

== Bibliography ==
- Bennett, Shelley, Leonard, Mark & West, Shearer. A Passion for Performance: Sarah Siddons and her Portraitists. Getty Publications, 1999.
- Furnas, Joseph Chamberlain. Fanny Kemble: Leading Lady of the Nineteenth-century Stage. Dial Press, 1982.
- Mole, Tom (ed.) Romanticism and Celebrity Culture, 1750-1850. Cambridge University Press, 2009.
