= Vincente de Valverde =

Spanish bishop and missionary

The Right Rev. Lord Brother Vicente de Valverde y Alvarez de Toledo, O.P.
- Bishop of Cuzco
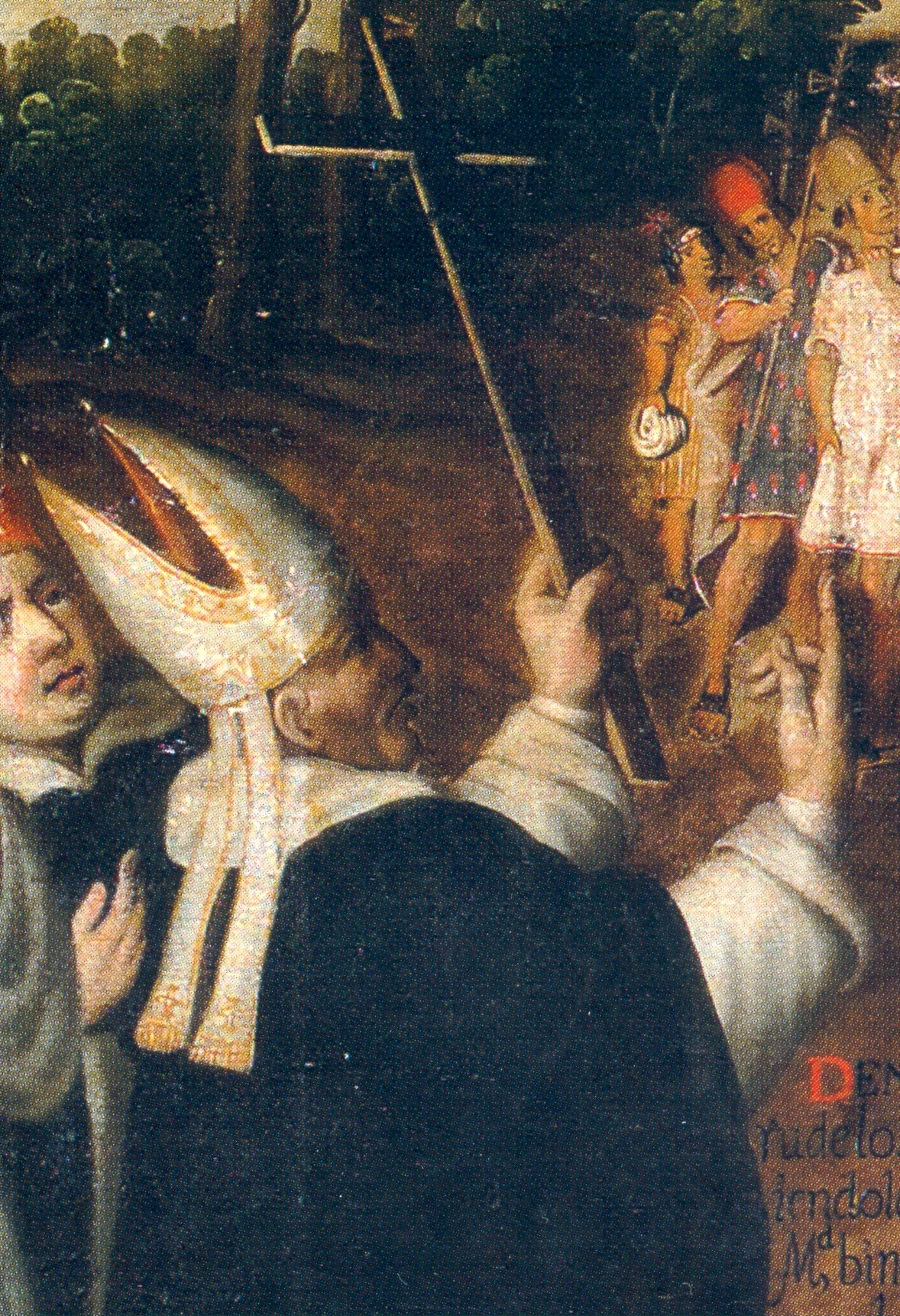
- Valverde in a detail from The Battle of Cajamarca in the Monastery of Santo Domingo, Cuzco, Peru (17th century)
- Province: Seville
- See: Cuzco
- In office: 1537–1541
- Successor: Juan Solano, O.P.

Orders
- Ordination: c. 1525
- Consecration: 1537

Personal details
- Born: c. 1499 Oropesa, Province of Toledo, Crown of Castile
- Died: 31 October 1541 Puná Island, New Spain
- Parents: Francisco de Valverde & Ana Alvarez de Toledo

Vicente de Valverde y Alvarez de Toledo, O.P., or Vincent de Valle Viridi was a Spanish Dominican friar who was involved in the Conquest of the Americas, later becoming the Bishop of Cuzco. He became the first resident bishop in South America. He was born in Oropesa, Spain, about 1495 and most sources claim he died on Puná Island, now part of Ecuador, in 1541, at the hands of the indigenous peoples.

== Biography ==
He was born in Oropesa, near Toledo, at the end of the 15th century. He was the son of Francisco de Valverde and Ana Alvarez de Toledo, and was related to many noble families of the region, in particular to that of Francisco Pizarro, the conquistador of Peru, and that of Hernán Cortés, the conqueror of Mexico. In 1515 he was sent to study at the University of Salamanca. While a student there, he later asked to be received into the Dominican Order, which he was in 1523 at the Priory of San Esteban at Salamanca. He became a professed friar of the Order in April 1524, and was ordained a priest within the next few years.

Valverde accompanied Pizarro as a missionary on his intended voyage of the conquest of Peru according to the 1529 agreement. He arrived in Peru about 1530, although it is not certain whether he traveled directly there with Pizarro from Spain in 1529 or arrived at San Miguel de Piura in 1531 with re-enforcements from Panama, the initial staging base for the Spanish forces.

Before the Battle of Caxamarca on 16 November 1532, Valverde endeavoured to obtain the Great Inca Atahuallpa's peaceful submission. When Atahuallpa rejected a pact of friendship with Pizarro, Friar Vicente joined in the conversation: “He came forward holding a crucifix in his right hand and a breviary in his left and introduced himself as another envoy of the Spanish ruler. ...Friar Vicente called upon the Inca to renounce all other gods as being a mockery of the truth.” Atahuallpa simply replied that he could not change his beliefs in the all powerful and ever living Sun and other divinities.

Following the death of Atahuallpa, Pizarro saw no further obstacles to his conquest and decided to march into Cuzco on 15 November 1533, bringing Valverde along with him and his followers. On 23 March 1534, a church was erected in Cuzco and became Valverde's parish church. Pizarro also gave him a large native commandery, whom Valverde allegedly mistreated by simply using them as slaves.

Valverde headed back to Spain later that year to assist Pizarro's brother, Hernando Pizarro, in his negotiations at court. There he presented to the emperor, by order of Pizarro, an account of the conquest, under the title of Relacion de la Conquista de los Reynos de Peru, in which he claimed that the Native Americans could scarcely be considered as human beings, as they had no souls.

He was nominated bishop of Cuzco in 1535.

In 1536 Valverde was named Protector of the Natives and Inquisitor. That same year, the Holy See established Cuzco, the royal city of the Incan kings, as the seat of the first diocese of the Catholic Church in South America, covering the entire continent, up to modern Nicaragua. Emperor Charles V named Valverde as the first Bishop of Cuzco; Pope Paul III ratified this choice in a consistory held in January 1537.

After being consecrated as a bishop, Valverde returned to Peru in the beginning of 1538, just before the execution of Diego de Almagro, which he had unsuccessfully tried to prevent. The new bishop found the spiritual duties for his vast diocese arduous, especially combined with those of the office of Protector of the Natives. This forced him to ignore the members of the military constantly, as the adventurers who made up the Spanish armies had no thought of justice or mercy to the Indians. In 1539 Valverde had work begun for the first cathedral of the diocese, now the Church of the Triumph, built on the site of a temple attached to the palace of Viracocha Inca, the last native ruler of the region. On 11 March 1540 he officiated at its consecration.

After the assassination of Francisco Pizarro by forces of Diego de Almagro II in June 1541, Valverde fled to Panama, where his brother had been appointed as governor by Pizarro. He halted for a brief stay on Puná Island, near Guayaquil, in Ecuador, where he was captured and eaten by the local indigenous people on 31 October 1541.

== Criticisms ==
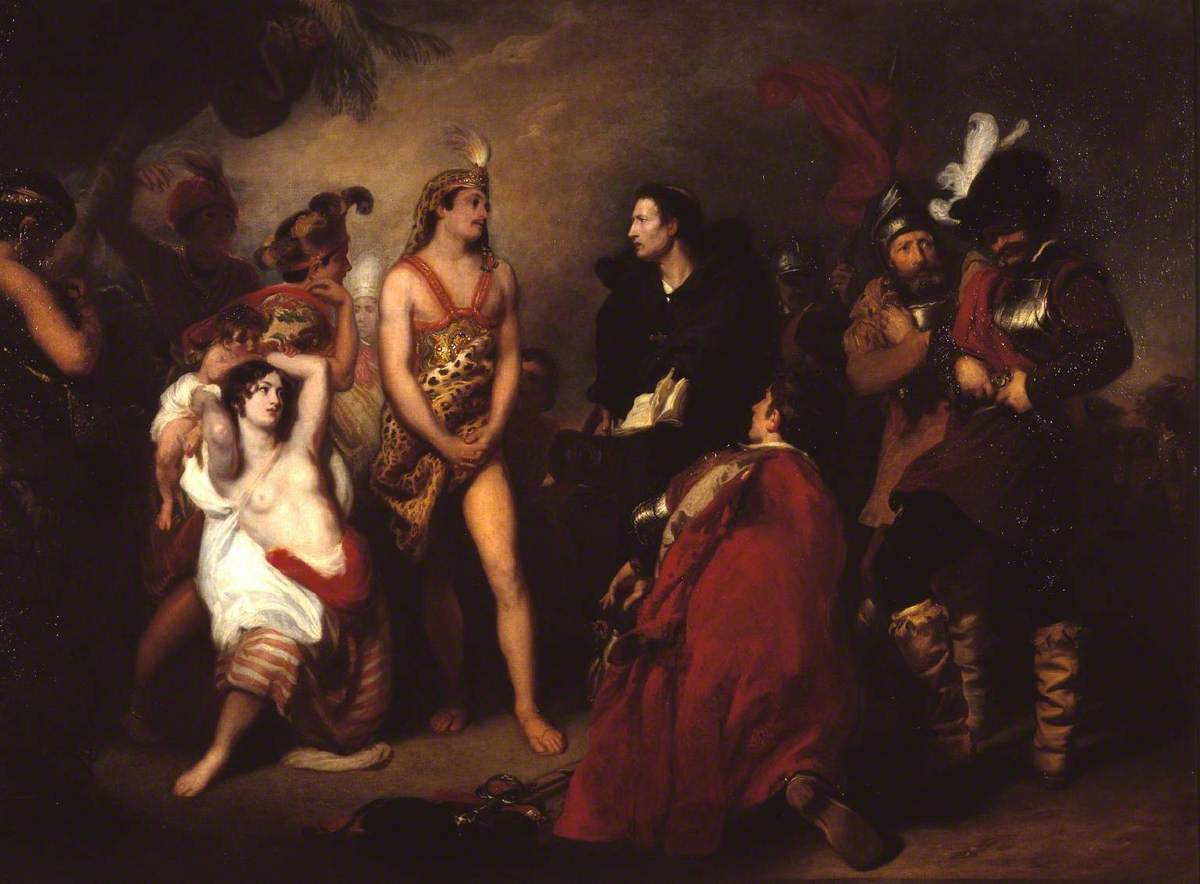
The First Interview Between the Spaniards and the Peruvians by Henry Perronet Briggs. The painting depicts the moments before the Battle of Cajamarca with Vincente de Valverde in the centre

By far Valverde's negative and contradictory side was his alleged mistreatment of the natives of Peru whom, instead of teaching the Catholic faith, he oppressed, enslaved and forced to work for the Church. These charges came about when Valverde was later appointed by Pizarro on a commission to apportion lands and natives to the royal officers, along with the lawyer, Antonio de Game, whom Pizarro had appointed Supreme Judge of Cuzco. The latter charged Valverde in a letter to the emperor, dated 10 March 1539, with arbitrary acts and insisted that instead of protecting the natives, he only mistreated them and sought to confiscate their lands, and always gave the greater part to himself and his assistant. (This was the complete opposite to what Bartolomé de Las Casas, another Spanish Dominican friar and bishop, did years later by defending the natives' rights in works he published and in visits to Spain to inform King Philip II of the abuses committed against the local natives by the Conquistadors.)

The validity of these charges is in dispute, however, as they are not universally mentioned by chroniclers of the period, and the main accusers might have had political reasons for these charges, as opponents of the Pizarro regime.

== See also ==
- Spanish conquest of Peru
- History of Peru

== External links and additional sources ==
- Cheney, David M. "Archdiocese of Cuzco". Catholic-Hierarchy.org. (for Chronology of Bishops) ^{[self-published]}
- Chow, Gabriel. "Metropolitan Archdiocese of Cusco (Peru)". GCatholic.org. (for Chronology of Bishops) ^{[self-published]}
- Francisco Pizarro Response to a Petition by Pedro del Barco, 1539 Apr. 14. From the Collections at the Library of Congress (Document is counter-signed by Fray Vicente de Valverde)

Catholic Church titles
Preceded by none	Bishop of Cusco; 1537–1541	Succeeded by Juan Solano
