= Nurse (Romeo and Juliet) =

Character in Romeo and Juliet

- Romeo and Juliet character
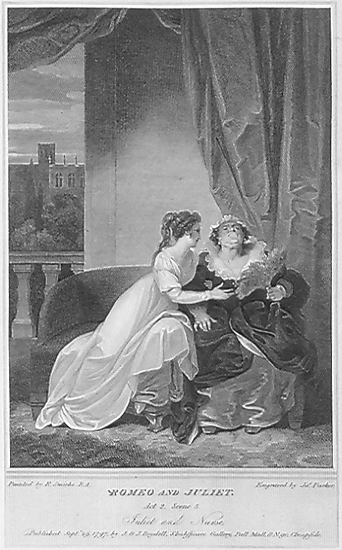
- A 1797 interpretation of Juliet and her Nurse

In-universe information
- Alias: Angelica (possible real name)
- Affiliation: Juliet
- Family: Unnamed (husband); Susan (daughter)

The Nurse is a character in William Shakespeare's classic drama Romeo and Juliet. She is the personal servant, guardian, and former wet nurse of Juliet Capulet, and has been since Juliet was born. She had a daughter named Susan who died in infancy, before she became the wet nurse to Juliet. The Nurse is Juliet's foremost confidante, and consequently very important to Juliet's life.

She is one of the few people, along with Friar Laurence, to be made aware of the blossoming romance between Romeo and Juliet. Her personal history outside of the Capulet estate is unknown, other than that she once had a husband and a daughter, both of whom are deceased.

== Origins ==
The Nurse is a character in Arthur Brooke's poem The Tragical History of Romeus and Juliet, as Shakespeare's main source text. She is like family to the Capulets. The Nurse plays a similar role in the poem by Brooke, though she is less critical of Paris and is banished for the events that took place.

== Role in the play ==
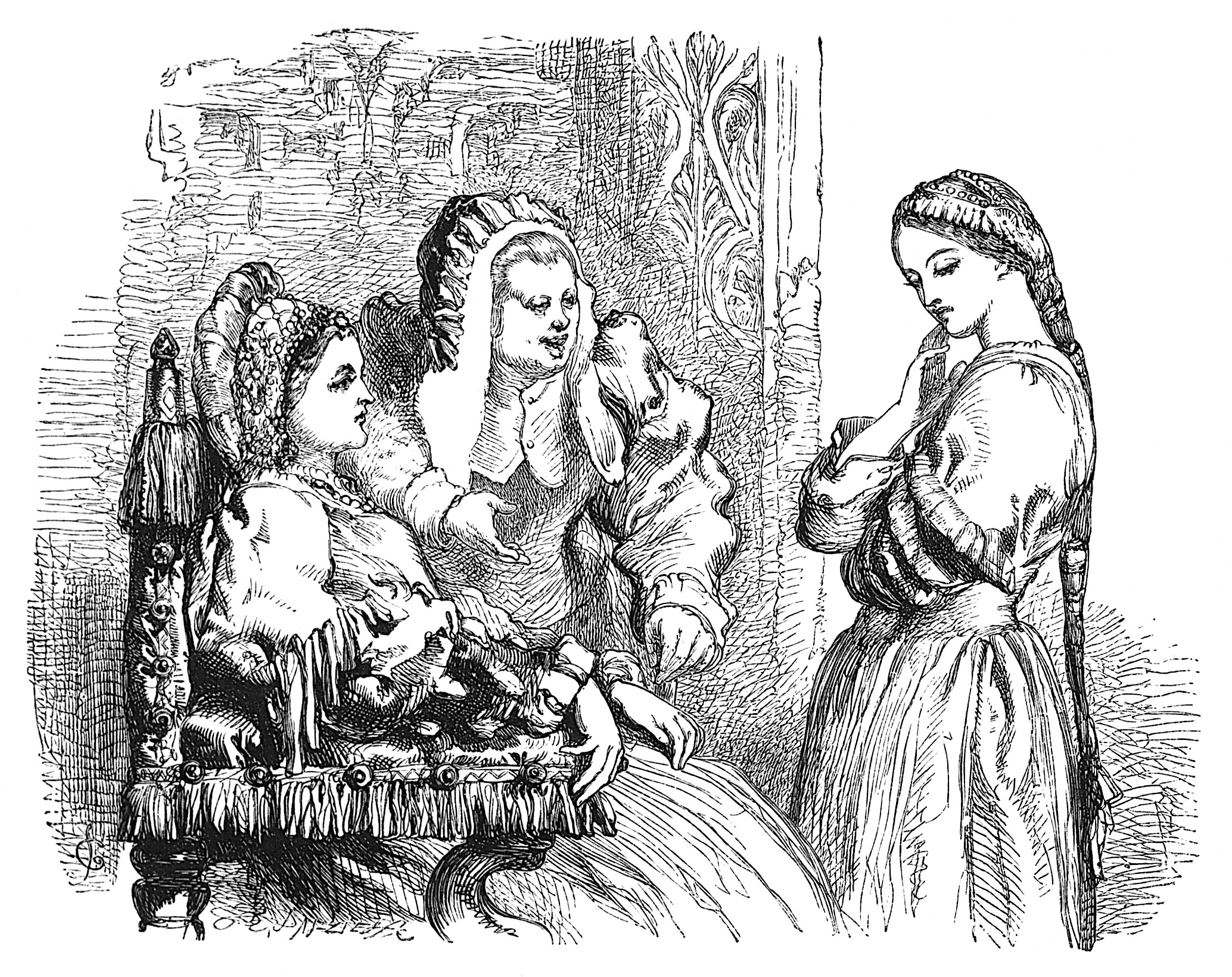
The Nurse tries to convince Juliet to marry Paris.

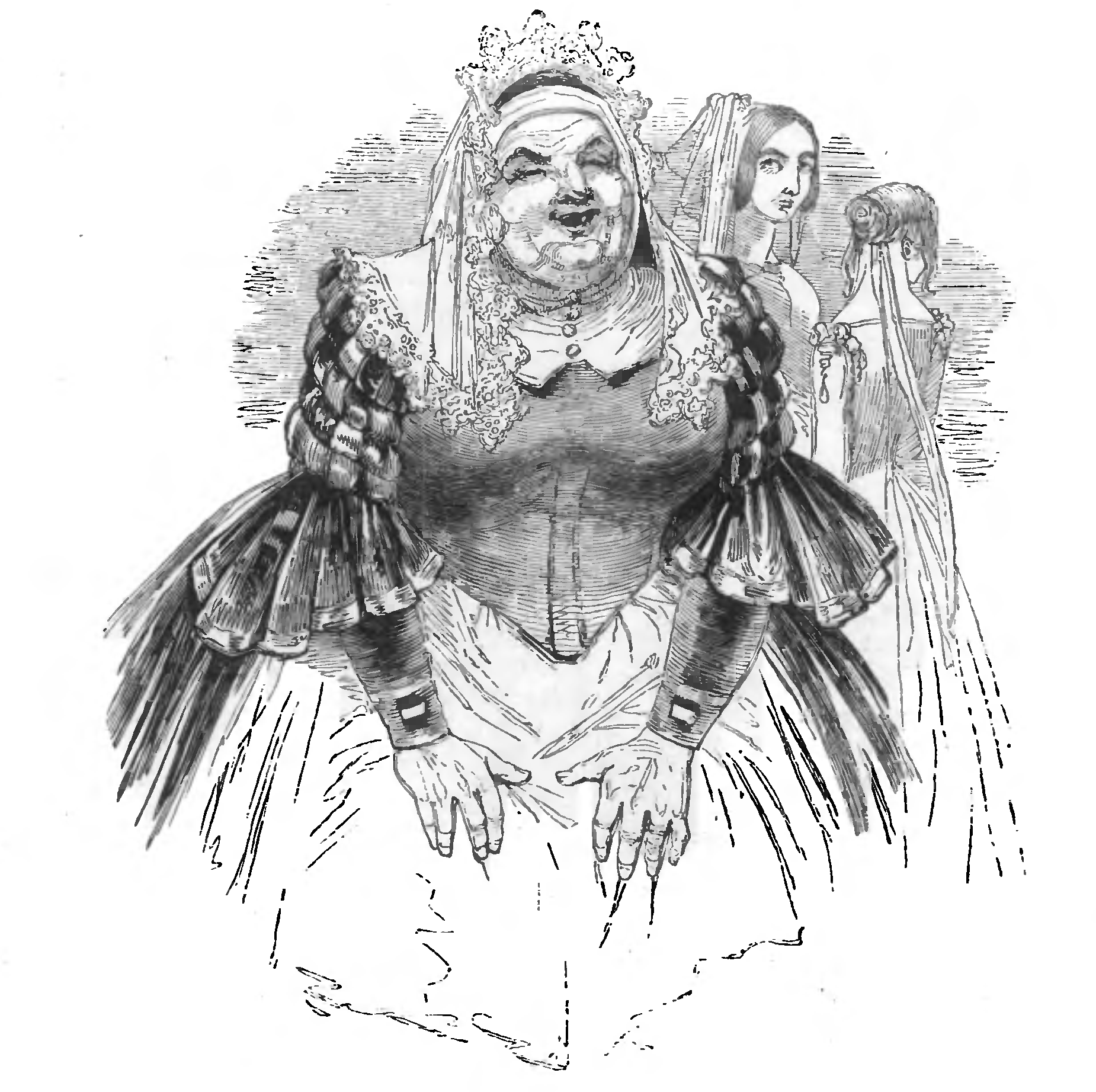
The Nurse delivering her "Yet I cannot choose but laugh" line in Act I scene III in an 1847 drawing

The Nurse is sent by Juliet in act two, scene four to seek out Romeo the night after their first kiss and exchange of vows. The Nurse finds Romeo and soon after returns to Juliet with news of Romeo's continued affection. It is because of the Nurse's approval that Juliet ultimately decides to go through with marrying Romeo.

Later, the Nurse is overcome with grief at the death of Tybalt, she goes and fall, "He's dead, he's dead, he's dead! We are undone, lady, we are undone! Alack the day, he's gone, he's killed, he's dead!" The Nurse is the one to deliver the news of Romeo's banishment to Juliet; in spite of Tybalt's murder coming from Romeo's hands, Juliet bids the Nurse to seek out Romeo for her at Friar Laurence's cell for one final night with him before he flees to Mantua.

When Juliet learns that her parents expect her to marry Paris, the Nurse urges the girl to go ahead with the marriage. Even though Juliet was already married to Romeo, the Nurse felt that Juliet would never see her husband again. Following this, Juliet feels betrayed and decides never to share any more of her secrets with the Nurse.

The Nurse discovers Juliet under the spell of Friar Laurence's potion in act four, scene five, and the grief of her death as seriously as she mourned Tybalt. She is, finally, present at the real deathbed of Romeo, Juliet, and Paris, though speechless. Indeed, she loses perhaps the dearest friends of anyone, having suffered through the deaths of her husband, Susan, Tybalt, Romeo, and Juliet.

The nurse has the third largest number of lines in the original play; only the eponymous characters have more lines.

== Literary interpretations ==
Lois Leveen's 2014 novel Juliet's Nurse imagines the fourteen years leading up to the events in the play from the point of view of the nurse.

== Analysis ==
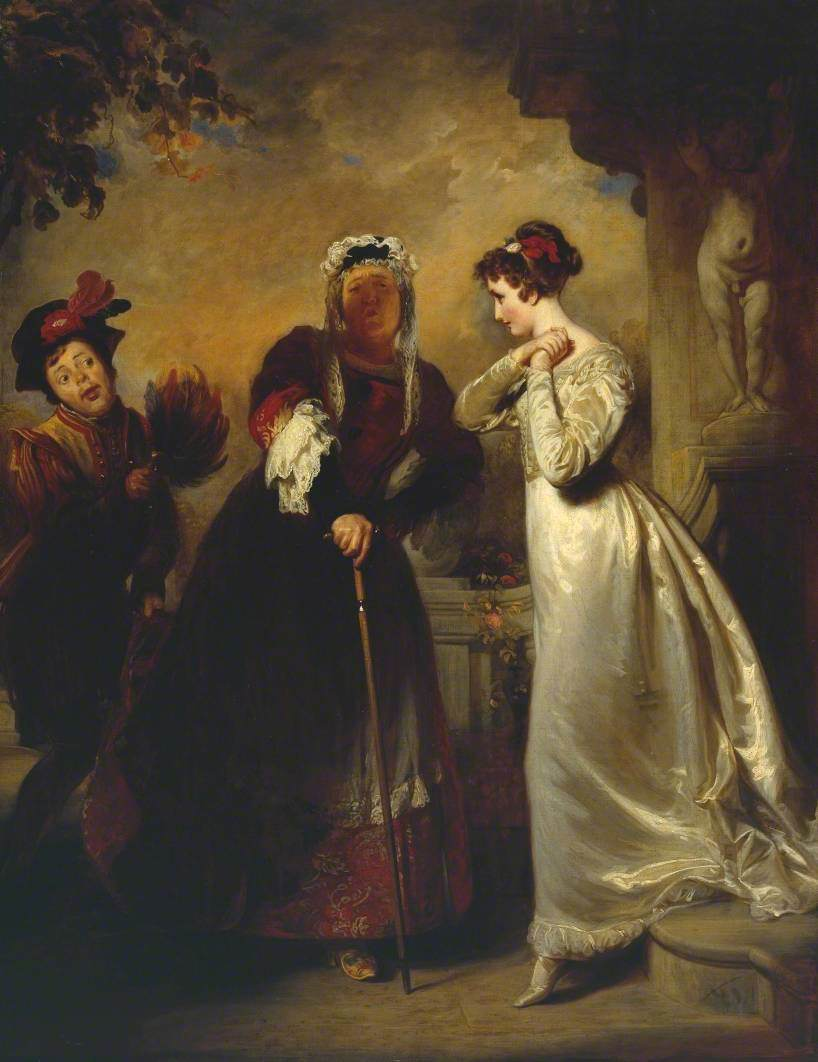
Juliet and Her Nurse by Henry Perronet Briggs, 1827

In choosing forms, Shakespeare matches the poetry to the character that uses it. Friar Laurence, for example, uses sermon and sententiae forms, and the Nurse uses a unique blank verse form that closely matches colloquial speech.

Friar Laurence agrees to marry Romeo to Juliet in an attempt to mend the dispute between the two families; the Nurse sees their union as one of legitimate romance. The Nurse recognizes that Juliet shows no interest in Paris' courting and is the only member of the older generation to take Juliet's feelings into consideration…that is, until she suddenly betrays Juliet's trust by saying that she should marry Paris. Only to the nurse does Juliet confide her feelings about both Paris and Romeo. The formal language Juliet uses around Paris, as well as the way she talks about him to her Nurse, show that her feelings clearly lie with Romeo.

The Nurse also admits to being something of a fool, proclaiming, "were not I thine [Juliet's] only nurse, I would say thou hadst suck'd wisdom from thy teat." She is implied to be ugly by Mercutio, who urges the Nurse's servant Peter to fetch her fan quickly, "to hide her face; for her fan's the fairer face." Mercutio also mentions her age, calling her an "ancient lady" as he exits from the same scene. Some illustrations even depict her as an obese or big boned woman, because of how Mercutio insults her. He calls "A sail! A sail!", meaning he thinks that the nurse is as big as a ship.

The Nurse is also a frequent user of malapropisms. Her view of romance is very pragmatic, much like Mercutio's views. When Juliet says that marriage is an honour she did not yet think of, the nurse laughs and exclaims, what an honour it is. The nurse's humour is very crude, which is shown when she makes a rude joke about the way Juliet will 'fall down' when she is older.

The Nurse's given name may be Angelica. In Act 4, scene 4, Lord Capulet, alone with the Nurse and Lady Capulet, tells "good Angelica" to order baked meats for Juliet's upcoming wedding to Count Paris. It is unclear from the text whether he is addressing the Nurse or Lady Capulet.

== Performance history ==
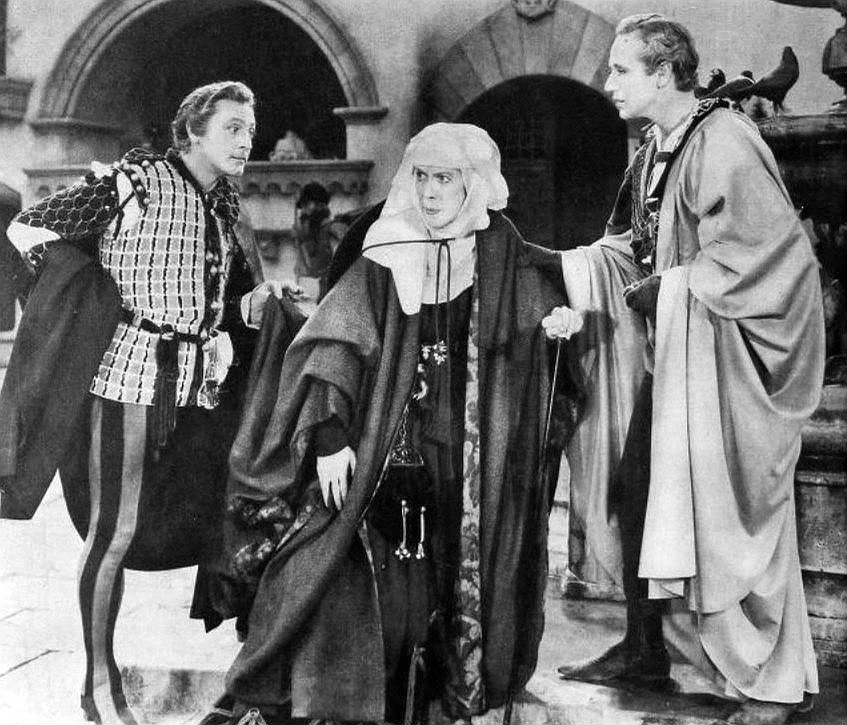
Edna May Oliver (center) as The Nurse in the 1936 film.

A sample of notable portrayals include:

- Jessie Ralph in Frank Reicher's 1923 Broadway show, which ran for 157 performances
- Leona Roberts in Eva Le Gallienne's 1930 Broadway staging
- Edith Evans in Katharine Cornell's 1934 Broadway production
- Edna May Oliver in George Cukor's 1936 film version
- May Whitty in Laurence Olivier's 1940 Broadway production
- Evelyn Varden in Peter Glenville's 1951 Broadway revival
- Flora Robson in the 1954 film rendition
- Chita Rivera as Anita in the original 1957 Broadway & 1958 West End productions of West Side Story
- Rita Moreno as Anita in West Side Story (1961) musical film; won the Best Supporting Actress Oscar
- Pat Heywood in Franco Zeffirelli's 1968 film adaptation
- Jan Miner in Theodore Mann's 1977 Broadway revival
- Celia Johnson in the 1978 BBC Television Shakespeare rendition
- Esther Rolle in The Tragedy of Romeo and Juliet (1982)
- Ivonne Coll as Nurse Angelica in Estelle Parsons's 1987 Broadway interpretation
- Miriam Margolyes in Baz Luhrmann's Romeo + Juliet (1996), a modernized version of the play
- Debbie Rochon as Ness in Tromeo and Juliet (1997), a transgressive black comedy interpretation
- Ashley Jensen as Nanette the Frog in the animated film Gnomeo & Juliet (2011)
- Lesley Manville in the 2013 film adaptation
- Jayne Houdyshell in the 2013 Broadway re-telling
- Melanie La Barrie as Angélique/Nurse in the original 2019 Manchester & West End productions of & Juliet, later reprising her role in the 2022 Toronto & Broadway productions
- Ariana DeBose as Anita in Steven Spielberg's 2021 musical remake; won an Oscar in the same category
- Minnie Driver as Nurse Jane in Rosaline (2022)
