= Juliet and Her Nurse (Briggs) =

Painting by Henry Perronet Briggs

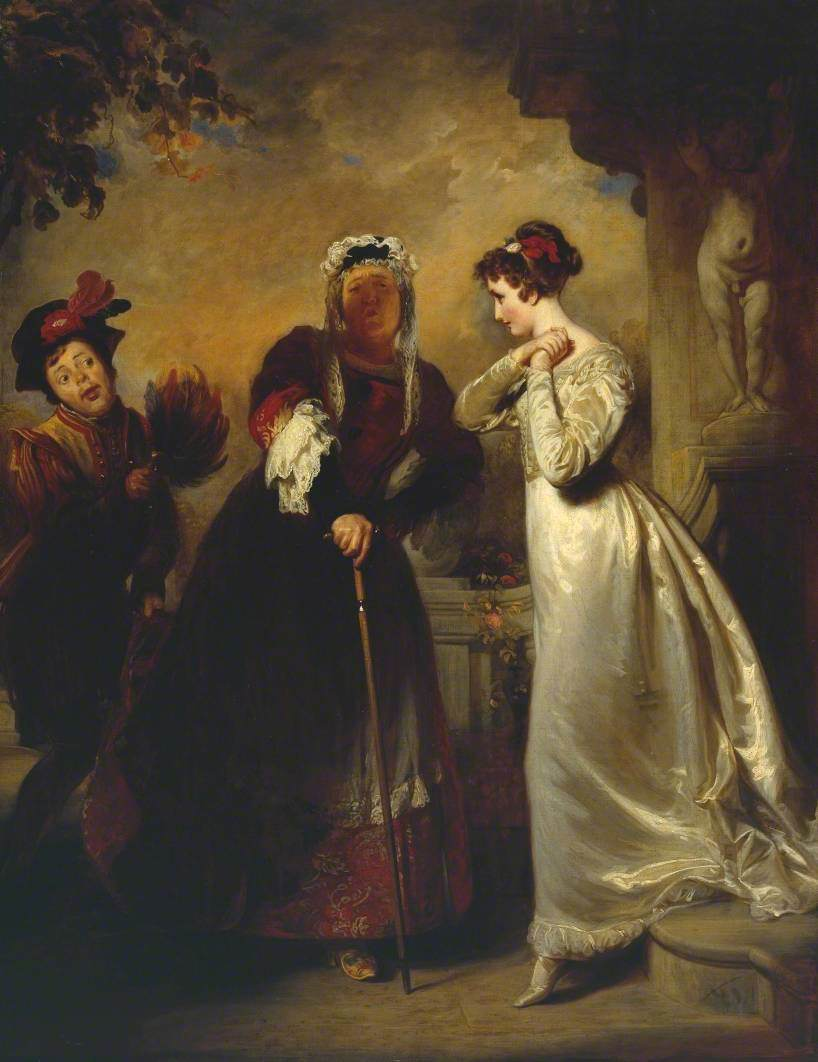
- Artist: Henry Perronet Briggs
- Year: 1827
- Type: Oil on canvas, genre painting
- Dimensions: 88.9 cm × 69.8 cm (35.0 in × 27.5 in)
- Location: Tate Britain, London

Juliet and Her Nurse is an oil on canvas painting by the British artist Henry Perronet Briggs, from 1827. It is held at Tate Britain, in London.

== History and description ==
It depicts a scene from William Shakespeare's 1597 tragedy Romeo and Juliet. Taken from the Act II Scene 5 it shows Juliet being informed by her faithful Nurse that she will be married that day. The subject was a popular one in British art of the era.

It was displayed at the Royal Academy Exhibition of 1827 held at Somerset House in London. It was acquired by the art collector Robert Vernon who in 1847 donated it to the National Gallery as part of the Vernon Gift. Today it forms part of the collection of the Tate Britain in Pimlico. An engraving based on the painting was made in 1833 as an illustration for Mary Shelley's The Mortal Immortal.

== See also ==
- Juliet and Her Nurse, an 1836 painting by J.M.W. Turner

== Bibliography ==
- Hamlyn, Robin. Robert Vernon's Gift: British Art for the Nation 1847. Tate Gallery Publications, 1993.
- Haywood, Ian, Matthews, Susan & Shannon, Mary L. (ed.) Romanticism and Illustration. Cambridge University Press, 2019.
- Sillars, Stuart. Shakespeare Seen: Image, Performance and Society. Cambridge University Press, 2018.
