= Santa Clara Island (Ecuador) =

Island belonging to Ecuador

- Interactive map of Santa Clara Island

Geography
- Location: Gulf of Guayaquil
- Coordinates: 03°10′00″S 80°25′59″W
- Area: 0.46 km^{2} (0.18 sq mi)
- Highest elevation: 100 m (300 ft)

Administration
- Ecuador

Demographics
- Population: Uninhabited

Designations

Ramsar Wetland
- Official name: Refugio de Vida Silvestre Isla Santa Clara
- Designated: 2 February 2002
- Reference no.: 1142

Santa Clara Island is a small, rocky and cliffed island lying at the entrance of the Gulf of Guayaquil, off the Pacific coast of Ecuador. Geologically, it is formed of sedimentary rock and is situated on the transition zone between the relatively shallow and brackish waters of the gulf and the deeper marine waters of the open ocean. It has an area of 46 ha. Though currently uninhabited, it contains archaeological remains and is sacred to the inhabitants of nearby Puná Island. It lies some 25 km south-west of Puná and 43 km west of the city of Puerto Bolívar.

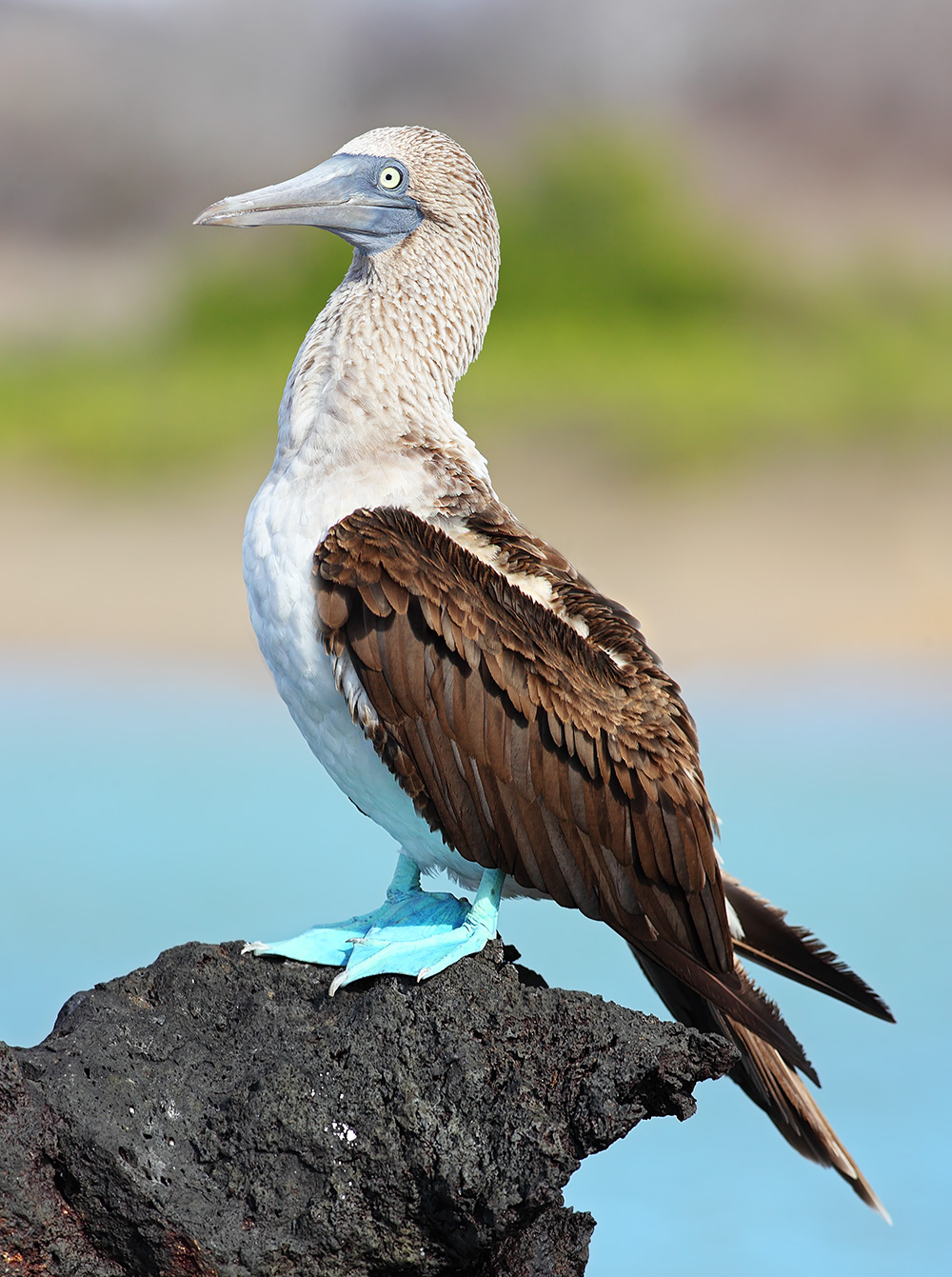
Blue-footed booby

== Environment ==
The upper parts of the island are vegetated with dry scrubland. The level of marine biomass productivity around the island is among the highest on the Ecuadorian coast. Some 200 species of phytoplankton and 140 of zooplankton have been recorded. Santa Clara has been designated an Important Bird Area (IBA) by BirdLife International because it supports colonies of seabirds, including brown pelicans, magnificent frigatebirds and blue-footed boobies. It is also an Ecuadorian nature reserve and a Ramsar site. The fauna of the surrounding waters includes 58 species of fish, olive ridley sea turtles, humpback whales, common bottlenose dolphins and South American sea lions.
