= The First Interview Between the Spaniards and the Peruvians =

Painting by Henry Perronet Briggs

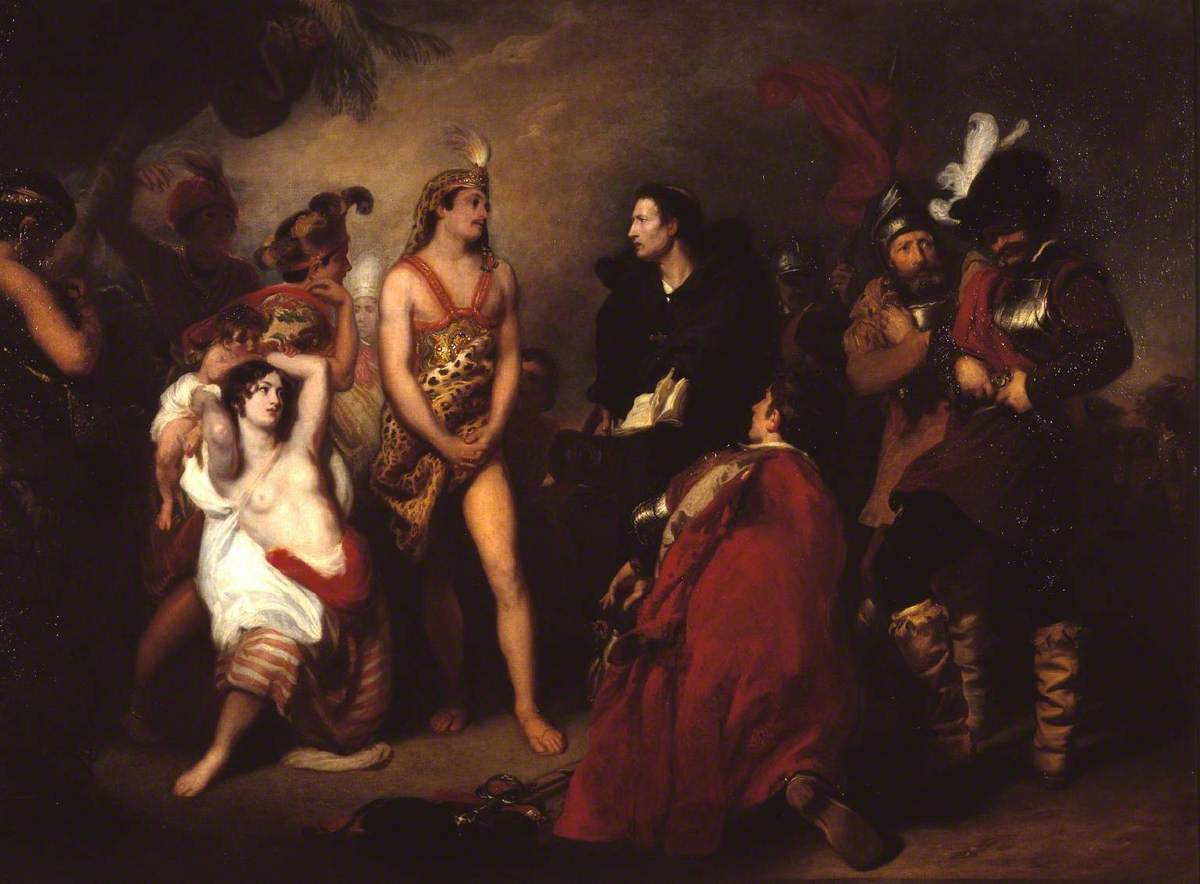
- Artist: Henry Perronet Briggs
- Year: 1827
- Type: Oil on canvas, history painting
- Dimensions: 195.6 cm × 144.8 cm (77.0 in × 57.0 in)
- Location: Tate Britain, London

The First Interview between the Spaniards and the Peruvians is an oil on canvas history painting by the British painter Henry Perronet Briggs, from 1827. It is held in the Tate Britain, in London.

== History and description ==
It depicts an episode that took place during the conquest of the Inca Empire by the Spanish in the 16th century. In this case its the meeting of the Spanish conquistadors and the Peruvian Incas in 1532. While the Incan Emperor Atahualpa greets the friar Vincente de Valverde and other Spaniards peacefully, on the right the conquistador Francisco Pizarro prepares to draw his pistol, triggering the Battle of Cajamarca and an upcoming massacre.

Briggs drew inspiration from the History of America (1777) by William Robertson. Two near-identical versions of the work were created. One was displayed at the Royal Academy's Summer Exhibition of 1826 and the other at the British Institution in 1827. Today the latter painting is in the collection of the Tate Britain, having been acquired by the nation in 1847, through the Vernon Gift from the art collector Robert Vernon.

== See also ==
- Pizarro Seizing the Inca of Peru, an 1846 painting of the subject by John Everett Millais

== Bibliography ==
- Earle, Rebecca. The Return of the Native: Indians and Myth-Making in Spanish America, 1810–1930
- Hamlyn, Robin. Robert Vernon's Gift: British Art for the Nation 1847. Tate Gallery Publications, 1993.
