= Battle of Puná =

Battle in the Spanish conquest of the Inca Empire

- Part of the Spanish conquest of Peru
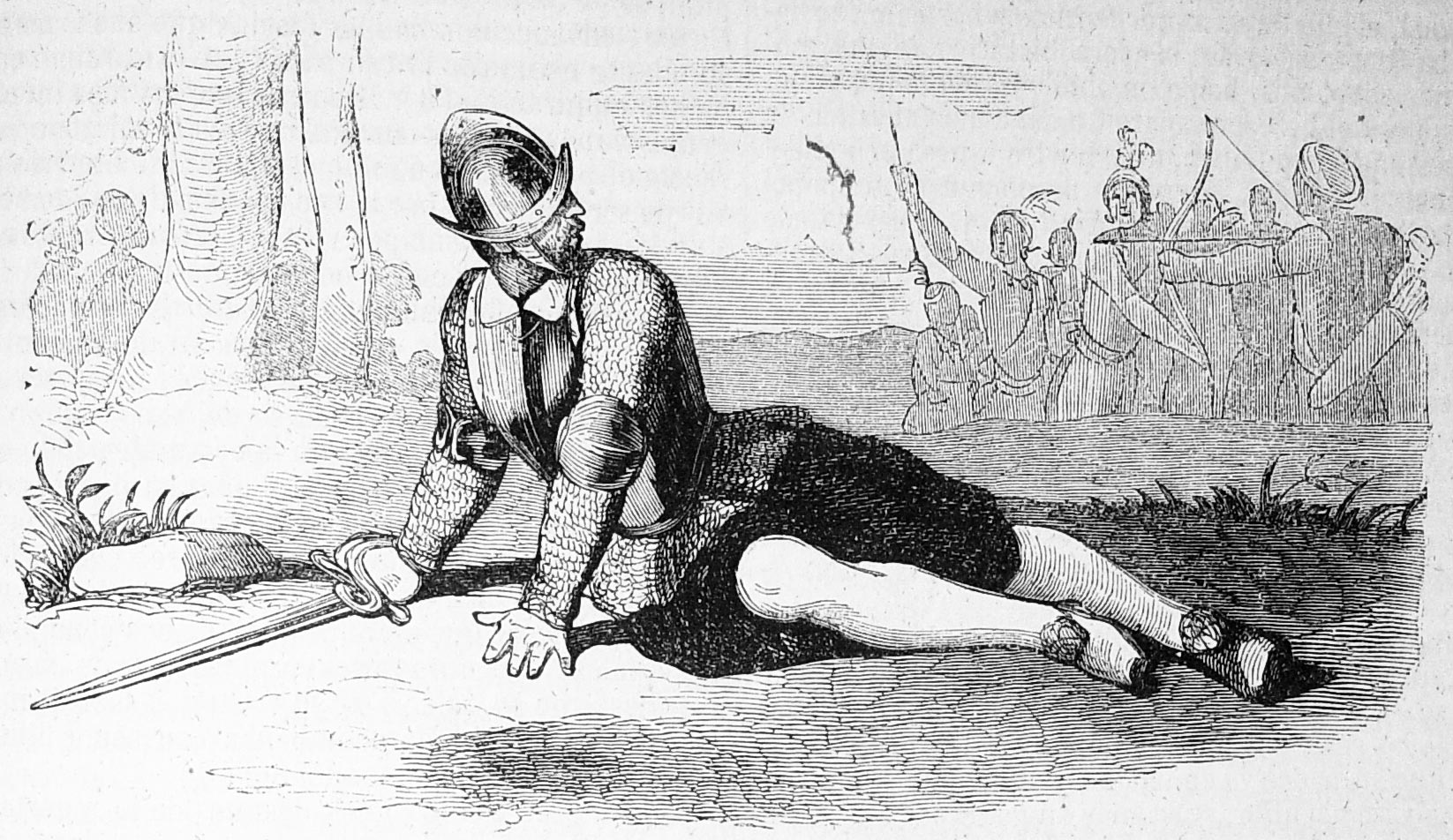
- Engraving depicting Hernando Pizarro wounded, during the fight against the natives of Puná.
Date	April 1531
Location	Puná, near Guayaquil, Ecuador
Result	Spanish victory

Belligerents
Spanish Empire indian auxiliaries	Puná natives

Commanders and leaders
Francisco Pizarro; Hernando Pizarro (WIA)	Tumbalá

Strength
≈ 200 spanish soldiers. hundreds of indian auxiliaries.	3,000 warriors

Casualties and losses
4 dead, many injured, several horses dead	Numerous

The Battle of Puná, a peripheral engagement of Francisco Pizarro's conquest of Peru, was fought in April 1531 on the island of Puná (in the Gulf of Guayaquil) in Ecuador. Pizarro's conquistadors, boasting superior weaponry and tactical skill, decisively defeated the island's indigenous inhabitants. The battle marked the beginning of Pizarro's third and final expedition prior to the fall of the Inca Empire.

== Background ==
The Spanish army, following a long and difficult journey from Panama throughout which many had fallen to virulence, predation, and other hazards, had docked at the Inca city of Tumbes in April. Received with quiet hostility by Incas who had perhaps been alerted to the acts of pillage and plunder committed on the fringes of the Empire by the invaders, the Spaniards, deeming it unsafe to remain in Tumbes, relocated their camp to the nearby island of Puna in preparation for an assault on the Inca city.

Initially, the Spanish occupation of the island proceeded without bloodshed. The natives of Puna were a warrior people who, reluctantly bowing before the might of the Inca Empire, had intermittently accepted the status of tributary state, though periods of friction and even open warfare had frequently erupted with the Incas out on the mainland.

The path to war was first triggered by Pizarro's native interpreters, who warned him, perhaps falsely, that several Punian chiefs had gathered to plan an insurrection. Pizarro had the chiefs captured, interrogated, and, apparently satisfied with their guilt, delivered to their traditional enemies at Tumbes where they were duly massacred by the Incas.

== Battle ==
According to Spanish sources, the warrior class of Puná, maddened with rage, immediately rushed to arms and stormed the Spanish camp, charging in the thousands. It seemed that the diminutive Spanish force would surely be overwhelmed and scattered. But what the Spaniards lacked in numbers they eclipsed in armaments and discipline. As the natives approached, many were met head on with deadly rows of lowered pikes, the use of which the Spanish had long mastered in the great wars of Italy and Flanders. Other Punians, charging in confused masses, were cut down and slaughtered in vast numbers by the concerted volleys of orderly musketeers. At length, Hernando Pizarro, sensing the enemy falter, mustered his cavaliers to his standard and spurred his horse into a charge. The Spanish cavalry sliced through native ranks with devastating effect. Within minutes, the Punians were in full rout.

The natives regrouped in the island's forests and thenceforth waged a guerrilla war to some success, destroying Spanish provisions and waylaying several scouts. Two Spanish ships with reinforcements, however, under Hernando de Soto, soon arrived by sea (with at least a hundred volunteers), and on these ships the Spaniards, bound for more fruitful conquests on the Peruvian mainland, embarked without incident and sailed back towards Tumbez, arriving there on May 16, 1532.

== See also ==
- Spanish conquest of Peru
