= Puná Island =

Island off the coast of southern Ecuador

Coordinates: 2°50′S 80°08′W

Location of Puná Parish

Puná Island (Spanish: Isla Puná), is an island just off the coast of southern Ecuador at approximately 80 degrees west longitude and 3 degrees south latitude. It is located at the head of the Gulf of Guayaquil, south of the mouth of the Guayas River and the city of Guayaquil, Ecuador's largest city and chief port. It is bordered by Jambelí Channel on the east and Morro Channel on the west, both of which connect the open Gulf of Guayaquil to the narrow mouth of the Guayas River. Uninhabited Santa Clara Island lies some 25 km to the south-west. The total area of Puná Island is 855 square kilometres (330 square miles). The island is a parish of Guayaquil Canton in Guayas Province.

== History ==
The Battle of Puná, fought on the island in April 1531, was an engagement of Francisco Pizarro's during the Spanish conquest of Peru. It was fought by the Spanish conquistadores allied with the natives of Tumbez, against their rivals, the people of Puná.

The missionary first bishop of Cuzco, Vincent de Valverde, was put to death by the islanders on 31 October 1541.

Hakluyt's 'Voyages' relate that Thomas Cavendish raided the island in 1587 during his circumnavigation having fought against local forces including natives who were by then loyal to the Spanish administration.

Puná Island is where rugby union in Ecuador was first played, in the 1930s, by English merchants.
