= Rugby union in Ecuador =

- Country: Ecuador
- Governing body: Federación Ecuatoriana de Rugby
- National team: Ecuador
- First played: 1930s

Rugby union in Ecuador is a minor, but growing sport.

== Governing body ==
The governing body is the Federación Ecuatoriana de Rugby, which became affiliated to CONSUR in 2011 but not yet to the IRB.

== History ==
Rugby union is found to some extent in Ecuador, with teams in Guayaquil, Quito, and Cuenca.

One out of two Spanish countries in South America still to compete under CONSUR's arm (the other one being Bolivia), Ecuador rugby story dates back to the 1930s when newspapers specified the presence of English merchants playing the game that they would eventually take to Puná island, along the coast of Guayas river, to play rugby criollo with the natives.

Rugby was first played in Ecuador in the 1930s, when it was introduced by British merchants to Puná Island on the Guayas River.

== See also ==
- Ecuador national rugby union team
