= Italian Brigands Surprised by Papal Troops =

1831 oil painting by Horace Vernet

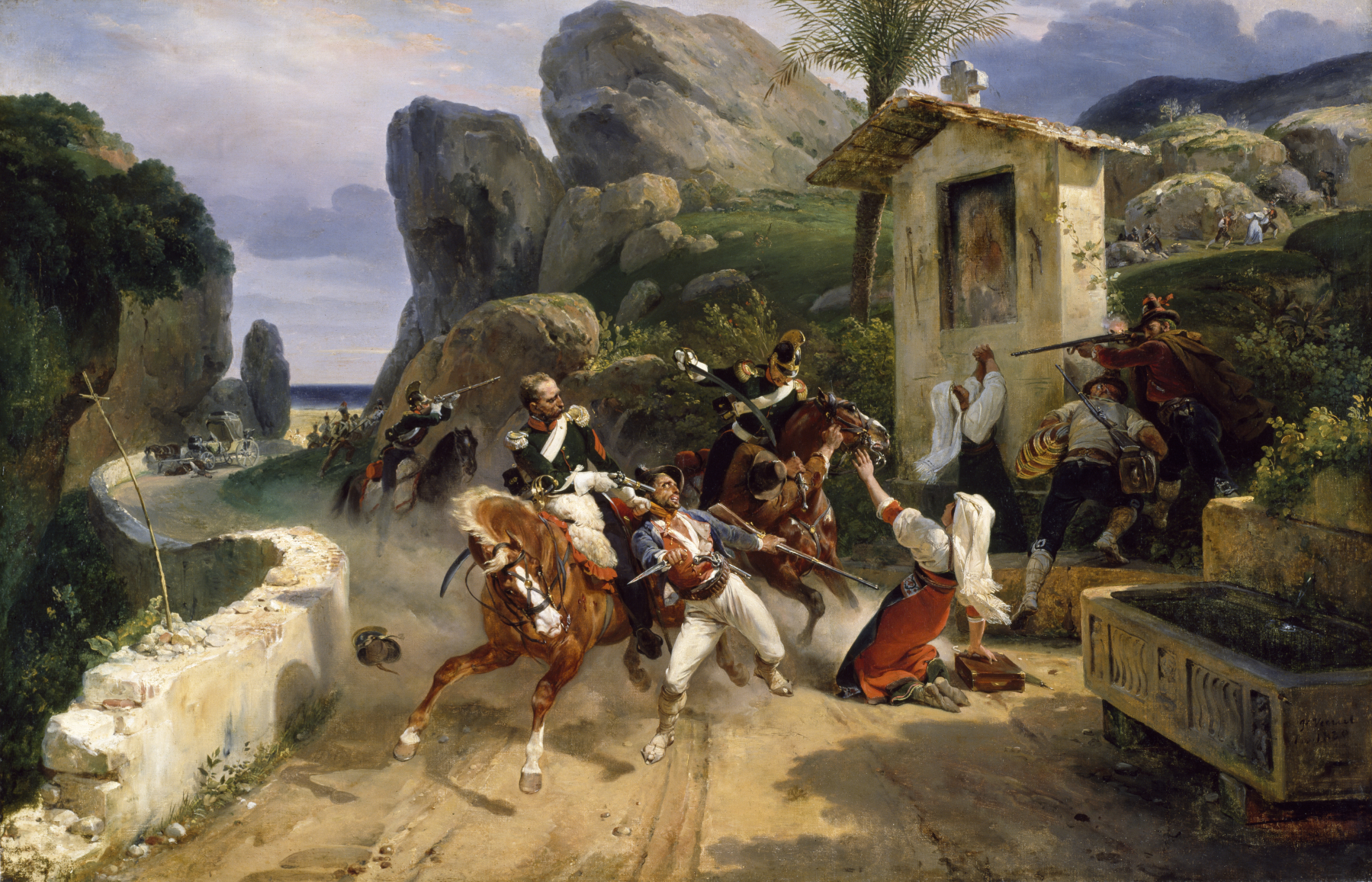
- Artist: Horace Vernet
- Year: 1831
- Medium: Oil on canvas
- Dimensions: 86.7 cm × 131.5 cm × 19 cm (34.1 in × 51.8 in × 7.5 in)
- Location: Walters Art Museum, Baltimore

Italian Brigands Surprised by Papal Troops is an 1831 painting produced in Rome by Horace Vernet. It is kept at the Walters Art Museum, in Baltimore.

== History ==
The painter Horace Vernet came to Italy in 1829, when he was already a well-known artist. He remained there until 1834 and worked as the director of the French Academy in Rome.

During his travels, he made around 20 paintings with the same colorful subjects and episodes of local life in the Roman countryside. They were works comparable to other painters who traveled Italy and mixed artistic classicism with research into color and local costumes. Vernet was considered a leader among these French painters, making him the juste milieu between the traditions of Romanticism and Neoclassicism.

The painting was recorded in the "John T. Johnston Collection", which was sold by its owner to William T. Walters of Baltimore on 20 December 1876 for $10,110, the most expensive work in Johnston's collection. In 1894, it passed to Henry Walters. In 1931, one of Walters' heirs left it to its current owner, the Walters Art Museum, Baltimore. The painting underwent conservation treatments in 1938, 1969, 1981, and 1991.

== Description ==
The painting depicts a battle along a road by the side of a cliff between a band of brigands surprised by a patrol of papal dragoons. They had been robbing a carriage, which is visible in the background of the street in the painting. Beyond the carriage, a strip of sea is visible.

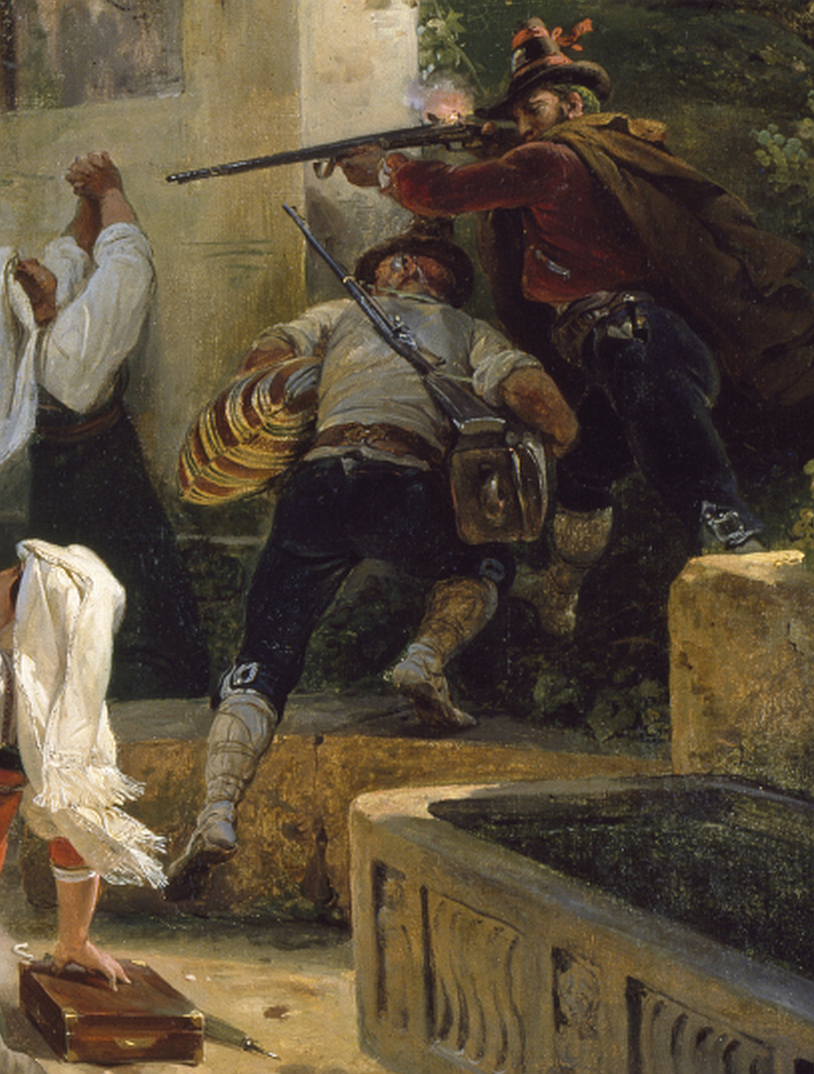
Detail of the fleeing bandit

In the foreground, two brigands are in the combat against two cavalry soldiers. The first is being grabbed by the handkerchief around his neck is about to receive a pistol blow, after having wounded the soldier's horse with the dagger in his right hand. The second has grabbed the bridle of the other soldier's horse and is about to be struck by the soldier's saber. A third brigand flees while holding in his hands two bags stolen from travelers, abandoning a third in the road. A fourth brigand fires a rifle at the soldiers, covering his companion’s flight. Two women, depicted in typical local costumes, despair and implore in front of a small religious chapel at the side of the road.

Further back on the right side of the painting, other brigands stand along the slope of the hill, some fleeing and pulling with them a feminine figure in a long blue dress—probably a passenger of the captured carriage. Others stand behind boulders, looking at the scene below. Along the road, a third cavalry soldier and some on foot fire at the fleeing brigands with muskets. The carriage in the background is empty, and a person and horse lie dead on the ground near its wheels.

== Style ==
The scene is realized in dramatic tones, following academic visual traditions with particular attention to the details of shades of color. The rocks in the background and the grey clouds in the sky magnify the drama of the action illuminated by the sun. The attention to the military subjects and the cavalry comes from the pictorial interest of Vernet's father, Carle Vernet. The unlikely palm tree depicted behind the chapel, amid the wild vegetation, add a touch of exoticism to the painting. Vernet made many paintings with Orientalist themes.

Critics have observed how the scene represents a single moment of action: the hat of the cavalry soldier in the foreground has not yet fallen to the ground, and the brigand is lifted from the ground as the soldier is about to shoot him. All the painting's details are meticulous, evoking the feeling of a "a pre-photographic, photographic painting".

The fountain of water in the foreground recalls a classical sarcophagus, a common feature in the neoclassical themes of the French school in Rome at that time.

== Genre ==
Brigands that lived in the Roman countryside, despite being a serious menace to travelers, were a preferred Romantic figure of numerous Roman painters and artists of the time, like Bartolomeo Pinelli, Louis Léopold Robert, Léon Cogniet, and Luigi Rocco. They took up the same themes as the Roman Bamboccianti painters and mixed them with Neo-classical influences.

Vernet, probably due to the success of those works, began to compose paintings on the topic in 1820 with his Route de Naples, which represented a group of bandits ready for an ambush and hiding behind a group of boulders near a seaside road by Terracina. The success of the painting was immediate and was reproduced as a lithography by Francois Saeraphin Delpech.

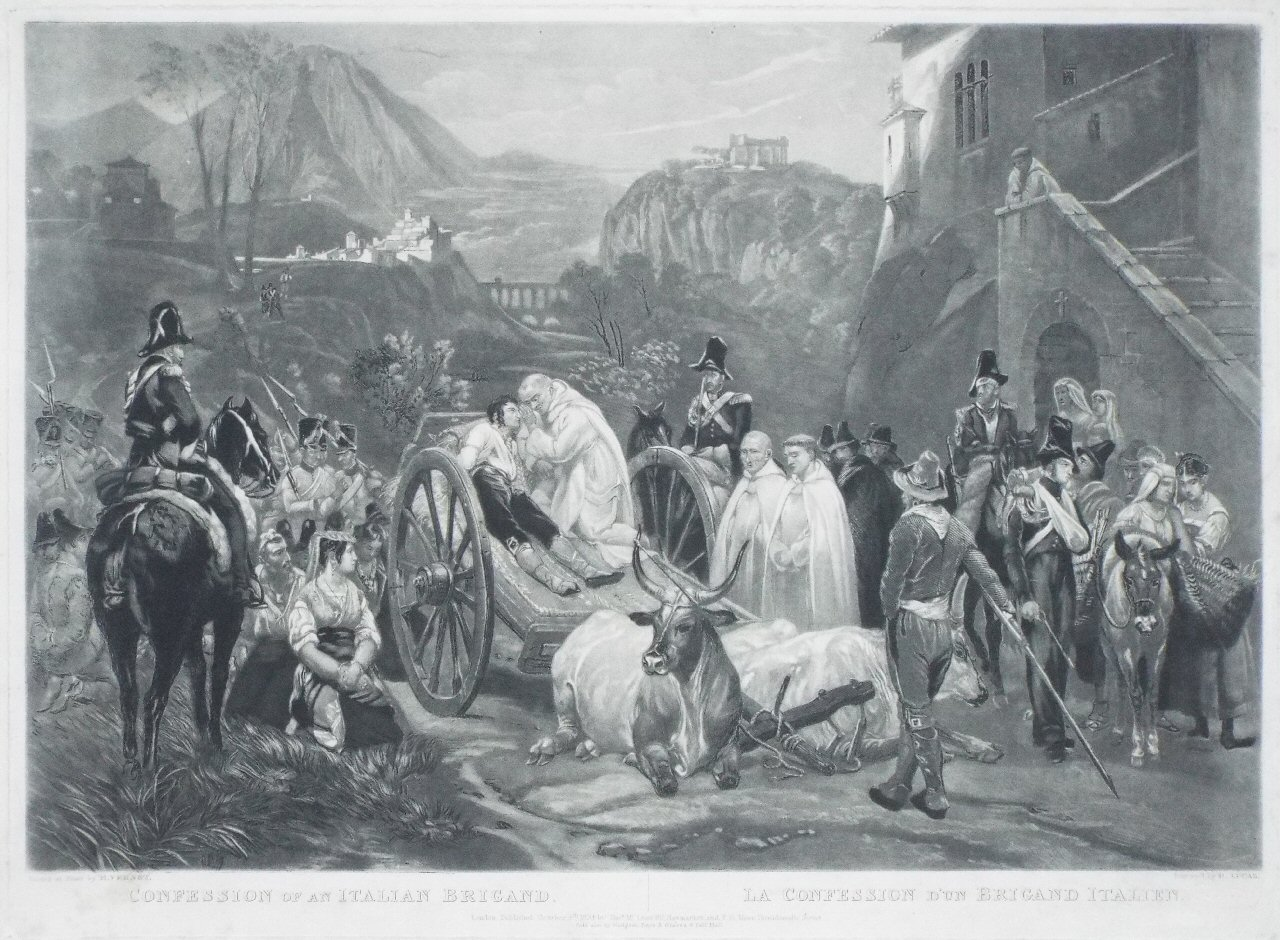
Reproduction of Confession of an Italian Bandit, 1834

After Italian Brigands Surprised by Papal Troops, Vernet made a third painting on the subject of brigands, Confession of an Italian Bandit, in 1834. It was destroyed in the sacking of the Château de Neuilly during the Revolution of 1848. The painting, which was reproduced several times, showed a dying bandit lying on an ox-driven cart receiving absolution by a monk kneeling by his side. The background landscape largely depicts neo-classical motifs like temple ruins and the arches of a Roman aqueduct. The capture of the repentance of the bandit and his absolution closes Vernet's trilogy of brigand paintings (that is, Route de Naples, Italian Brigands Surprised by Papal Troops, and Confession of an Italian Bandit).

Also in the theme, Vernet painted The Brigand Betrayed in 1828, a scene of a brigand being captured by soldiers thanks to the betrayal of a woman with whom he had made an appointment. Again, it was a painting that mixed realism with a dramatic scene depicting a single, instantaneous moment.

== Reproductions ==
Italian Brigands Surprised by Papal Troops was copied by Vernet's students and reproduced by Henry Dowe and David Lucas in two large aquatints.

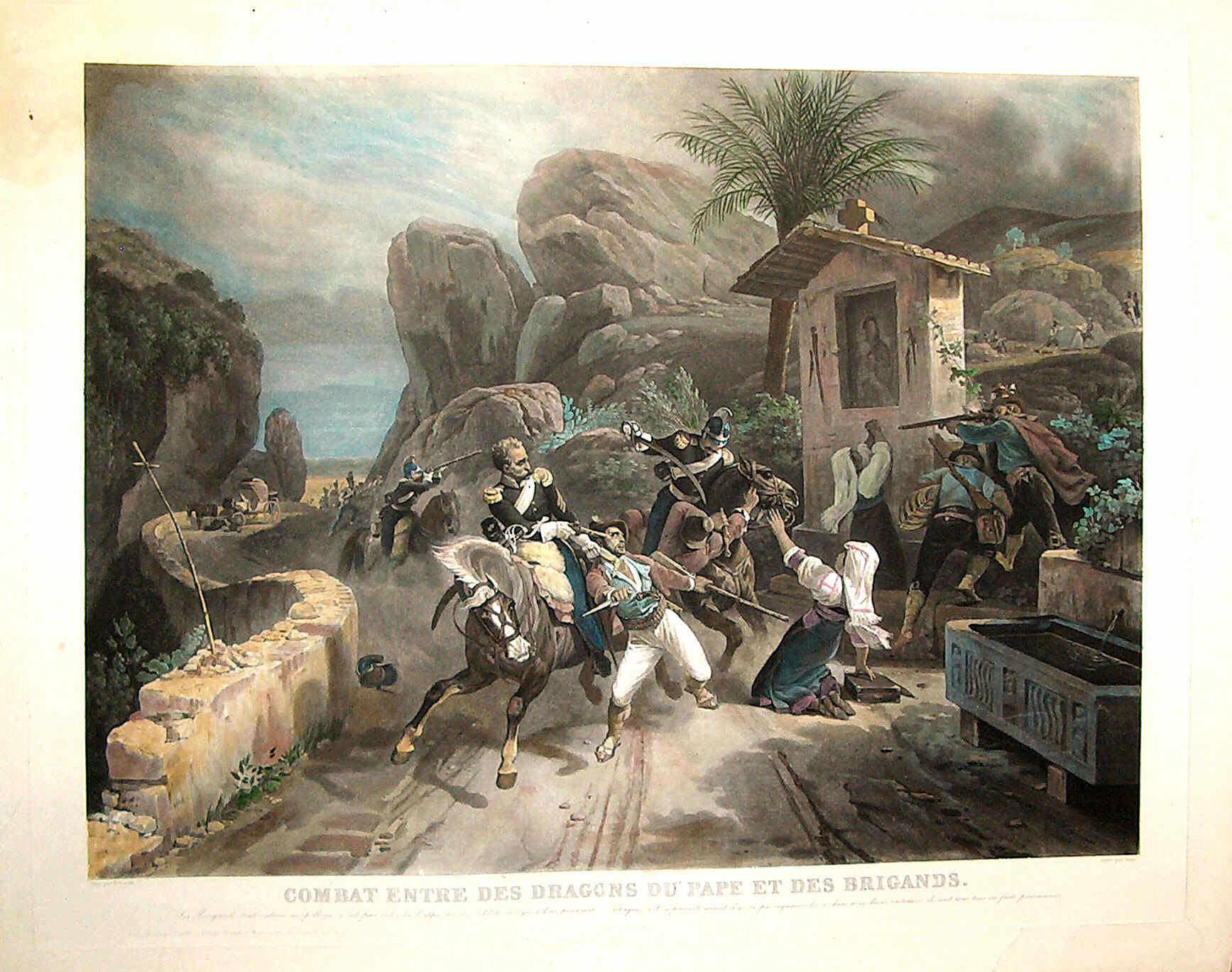
Printed reproduction, 1840

== See also ==
- Brigandage
- Romanticism

== Bibliography ==
- Lambe, Stephanie (2007). Roman outlaw: Horace Vernet's 1830 revolution, "Italian Brigands Surprised by Papal Troops". University of Delaware.
- Buizard, L.M. (1826). Catalogue de l'oeuvre lithographique de Mr. J.E. Horace Vernet. Paris: de J. Gratiot.
- Strieter, Terry Wi. (1999). Nineteenth-century European Art: A Topical Dictionary. Greenwood Publishing Group.
- "Orace Vernet". L'Eco, Giornale di Scienze, Lettere, Arti, Mode e Teatri. 4 (77). 29 June 1831.
