= Colonel Blood Stealing the Crown Jewels =

Painting by Henry Perronet Briggs

- Artist: Henry Perronet Briggs
- Year: 1824
- Type: Oil on canvas, history painting
- Dimensions: 147.5 cm × 198.5 cm (58.1 in × 78.1 in)
- Location: Royal Academy of Arts; London

Colonel Blood Stealing the Crown Jewels is an oil on canvas history painting by the English artist Henry Perronet Briggs, from 1824.

== History and description ==
It depicts the attempt of the Anglo-Irish Colonel Thomas Blood to steal the Crown Jewels of England from the Tower of London in 1671 during the Restoration era. Blood was subsequently pardoned for the crime by Charles II. Briggs was known for painting a mixture of portrait paintings and history scenes during the Regency era.

== Provenance ==
The painting was exhibited at the British Institution in London 1824. In 1832 when Briggs was elected as a member of the Royal Academy of Arts at Somerset House he gave this as his diploma work. It featured in the Art Treasures Exhibition of 1857 in Manchester.

== Bibliography ==
- Gosling, Lucinda. Royal Coronations. Bloomsbury Publishing, 2013.
- Hanrahan, David C. Colonel Blood: The Man who Stole the Crown Jewels. Sutton, 2003.
- Hargreaves, Matthew. Candidates for Fame: The Society of Artists of Great Britain, 1760-1791. Paul Mellon Centre for Studies in British Art, 2005.
- Hodgson, John Evan & Eaton, Frederick Alexis. The Royal Academy and Its Members 1768-1830. John Murray, 1905.
- Pergam, Elizabeth A. The Manchester Art Treasures Exhibition of 1857. Routledge, 2017.
