= The Brigand Betrayed =

Painting by Horace Vernet

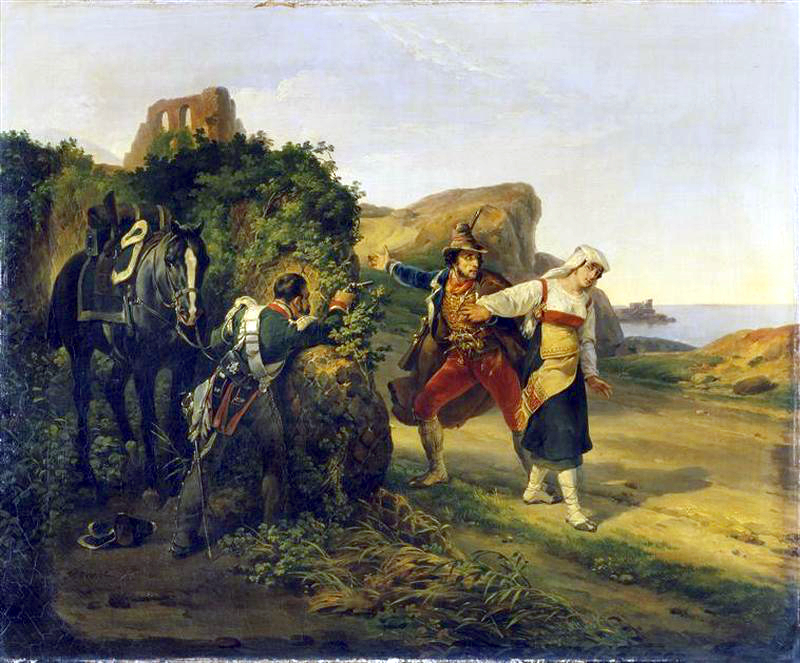
- Artist: Horace Vernet
- Year: 1828
- Type: Oil on canvas, genre painting
- Dimensions: 53 cm × 64 cm (21 in × 25 in)
- Location: Wallace Collection; London

The Brigand Betrayed is an 1828 genre painting by the French artist Horace Vernet. It depicts a bandit lured into a trap by a young woman, as a Papal dragoon waits behind a rock with a pistol. It was produced the year Vernet took up his position as director of the French Academy in Rome, around the same time as his A Roman Herdsman Driving Cattle. He was likely influenced by paintings of bandits produced by Léopold Robert. Today the painting is in the Wallace Collection in London, having been acquired by the Marquess of Hertford in 1870.

== See also ==
- Italian Brigands Surprised by Papal Troops, an 1831 painting by Vernet

== Bibliography ==
- Ingamells, John. The Wallace Collection: French Nineteenth Century. Trustees of the Wallace Collection, 1985.
- Harkett, Daniel & Hornstein, Katie (ed.) Horace Vernet and the Thresholds of Nineteenth-Century Visual Culture. Dartmouth College Press, 2017.
