= Visit of George III to Howe's Flagship the Queen Charlotte =

Painting by Henry Perronet Briggs

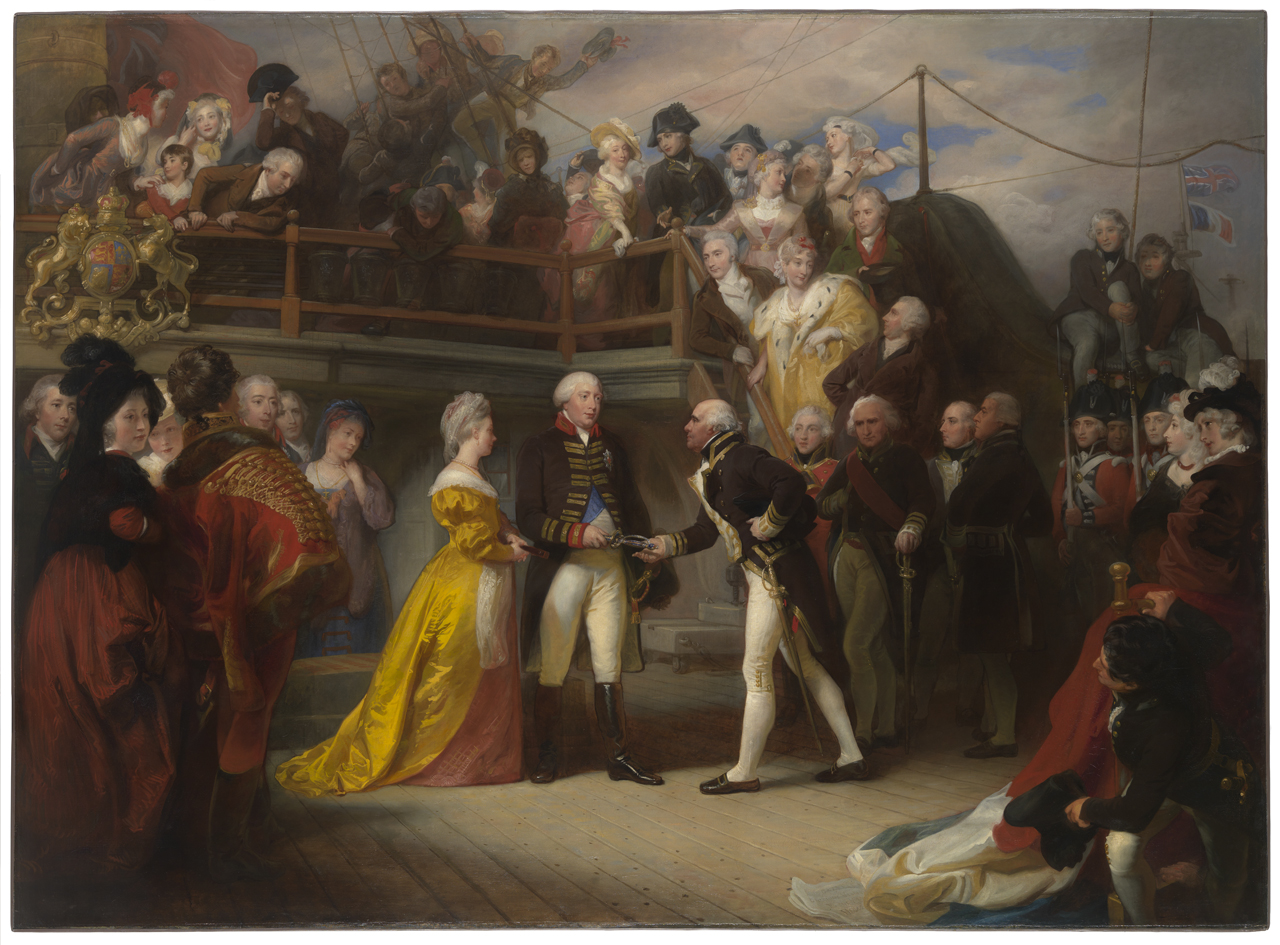
- Artist: Henry Perronet Briggs
- Year: 1828
- Type: Oil on canvas, history painting
- Dimensions: 162.5 cm × 255.5 cm (64.0 in × 100.6 in)
- Location: National Maritime Museum, London

Visit of George III to Howe's Flagship the Queen Charlotte is an oil-on-canvas history painting by the English artist Henry Perronet Briggs, from 1828. It is held at the National Maritime Museum, in London.

== History and description ==
It depicts an event that took place on 26 June 1794 when George III, his wife Queen Charlotte and leading members of the government visited the Royal Navy warship HMS Queen Charlotte at Portsmouth. A few weeks earlier Queen Charlotte had been the flagship of Admiral Richard Howe during the Glorious First of June, a British victory over the navy of Revolutionary France. The ship, launched in 1790, was named after the queen.

The King, with his wife beside him, is shown presenting a ceremonial sword to Howe. Other members of the royal family are also visible, while behind Howe stands his subordinates, Alexander Hood, Alan Gardner and Roger Curtis. On the far left of the painting, under the royal coat of arms, is the prime minister William Pitt the Younger. It was one of four naval paintings commissioned by the British Institution to encourage the creation of history scenes and was displayed at the Institution before moving to Greenwich Hospital. Today it is in the collection of the National Maritime Museum, in Greenwich.

== See also ==
- Lord Howe on the Deck of the Queen Charlotte, a 1794 painting of the battle by Mather Brown

== Bibliography ==
- Barton, Mark & McGrath, John. British Naval Swords and Swordsmanship. Pen and Sword, 2013.
- Bonehill, John. (ed.) Art for the Nation: The Oil Paintings Collections of the National Maritime Museum. National Maritime Museum, 2006.
- Davey, James. Tempest: The Royal Navy and the Age of Revolutions. Yale University Press, 2023.
- Lincoln, Margarette. Representing the Royal Navy: British Sea Power, 1750–1815. Routledge, 2017.
