= Henry Perronet Briggs =

English painter (1793–1844)

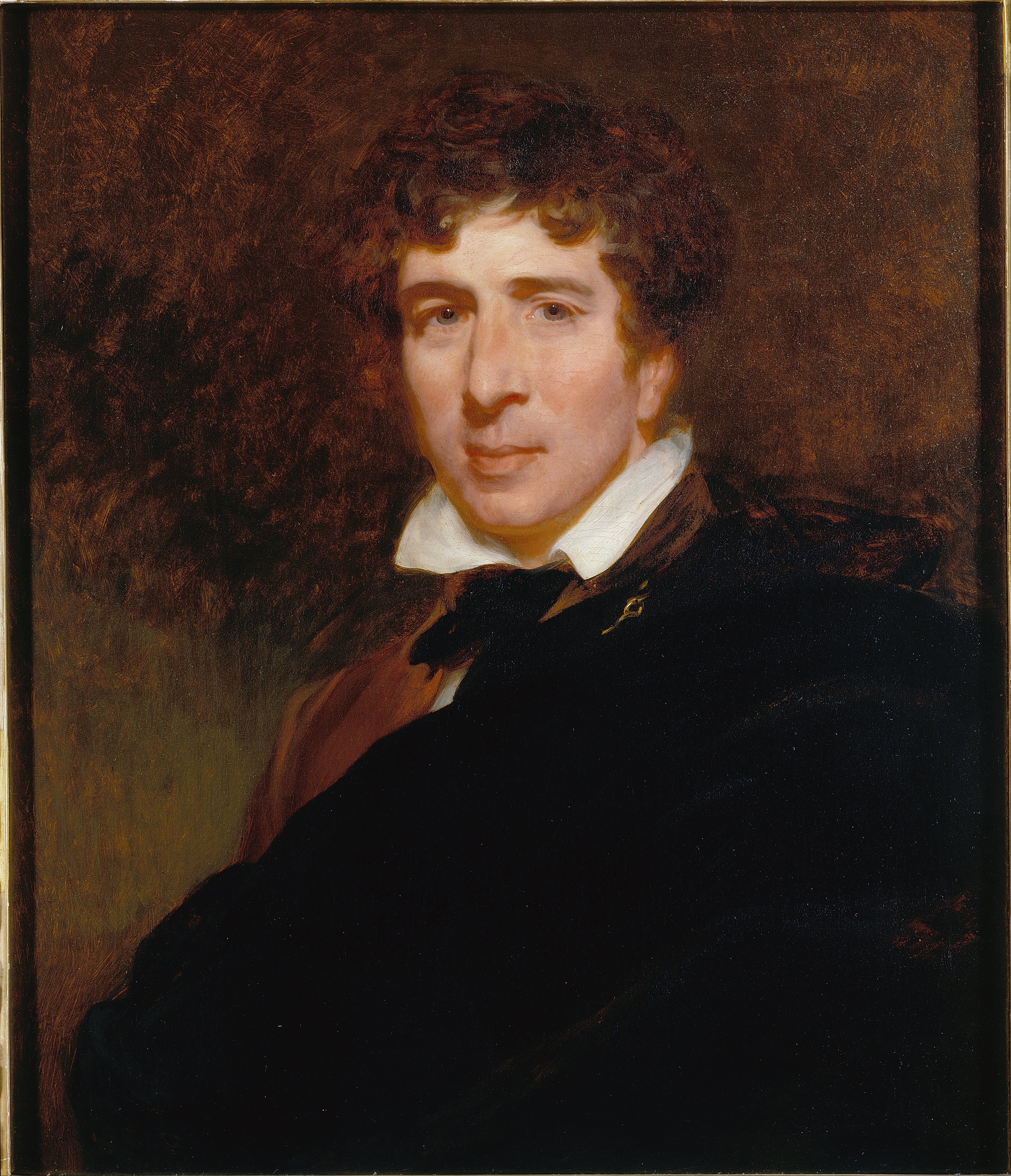
- Portrait by Charles Kemble (1832)
- Born: 1793; Walworth, England
- Died: 18 January 1844 (aged 50–51); London, England
- Known for: Painting
- Movement: Romanticism

Henry Perronet Briggs RA (1793 – 18 January 1844) was an English painter of portraits and historical scenes.

== Life ==
Briggs was born at Walworth, the son of John Hobart Briggs, a post office official and Mary nee Oldham. He was a Great grandson of Vincent Perronet. His cousin was Amelia Opie (née Alderson), the wife of artist John Opie (whose portrait was later painted by Briggs). While still at school in Epping he sent two engravings to the Gentleman's Magazine and in 1811 he entered as a student at the Royal Academy, London, where he began to exhibit in 1814. From that time onwards until his death he was a constant exhibitor at the annual exhibitions of the Academy, as well as the British Institution, his paintings being for the most part historical in subject. After his election as a Royal Academician (RA) in 1832 he devoted his attention almost exclusively to portraiture.

Briggs died of tuberculosis in London on 18 January 1844, aged 50 or 51. The lease to his home in Bruton Street, Berkeley Square was subsequently purchased by the portrait painter Thomas Henry Illidge.

Jacob Bell, founder of the Pharmaceutical Society, was a cousin of Briggs, and took painting lessons from the artist as a child. Bell commissioned several art-works and it was his connections that enabled Briggs to paint the portraits of pharmacist John Bell (of John Bell & Co.), and William Allen, the Society's first President. Briggs also designed the society's membership certificate. Thomas Francis Dicksee was a notable pupil of Briggs.

== Works ==
Two of Briggs' historical pictures, first exhibited at the Academy in 1826 and 1827, are now in Tate Britain, London – The First Interview Between the Spaniards and the Peruvians, and Juliet and Her Nurse. His large painting of Visit of George III to Howe's Flagship the Queen Charlotte, 1828, was initially purchased by the British Institution, presented to Greenwich Hospital, and is now in the National Maritime Museum. Among the more successful of the various Shakespearean scenes painted by him may be mentioned his Othello relating his adventures to Desdemona. Of his numerous portraits, the best perhaps was that of Lord Eldon. He also painted the portrait of the Indian leader Raja Ram Mohan Roy.

William Thackeray regarded Briggs as "out and out the best portrait-painter of the set"; though the Dictionary of National Biography entry (1886), by Warwick William Wroth, was more circumspect, commenting that "the pictures painted by Briggs, though not without merits of construction, cannot be said to belong to the highest class of art".

== Gallery ==
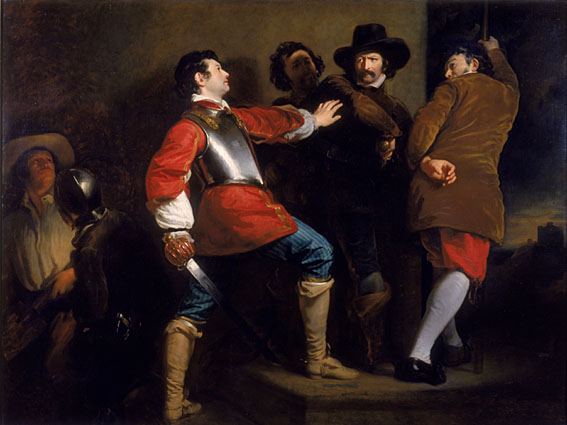
The Discovery of the Gunpowder Plot, 1823

Colonel Blood Stealing the Crown Jewels, 1824

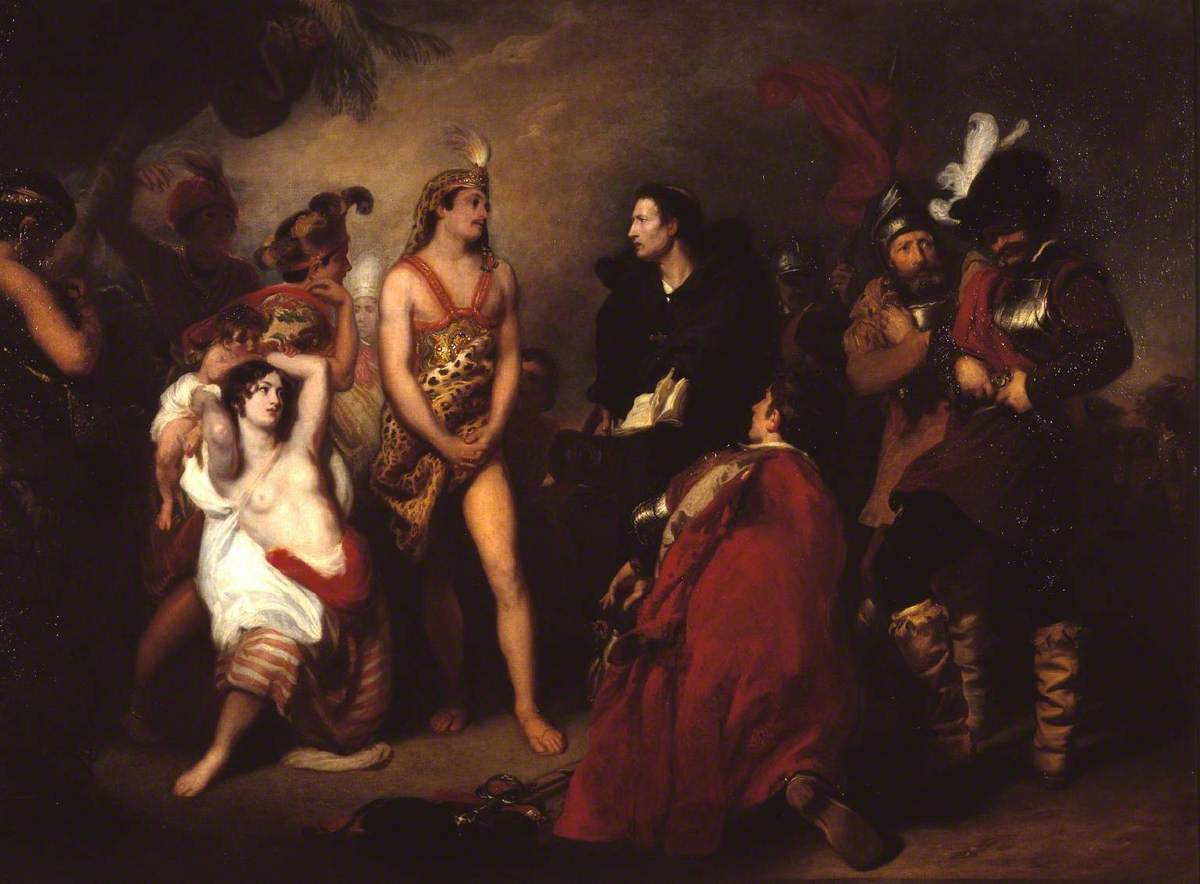
The First Interview Between the Spaniards and the Peruvians, 1827

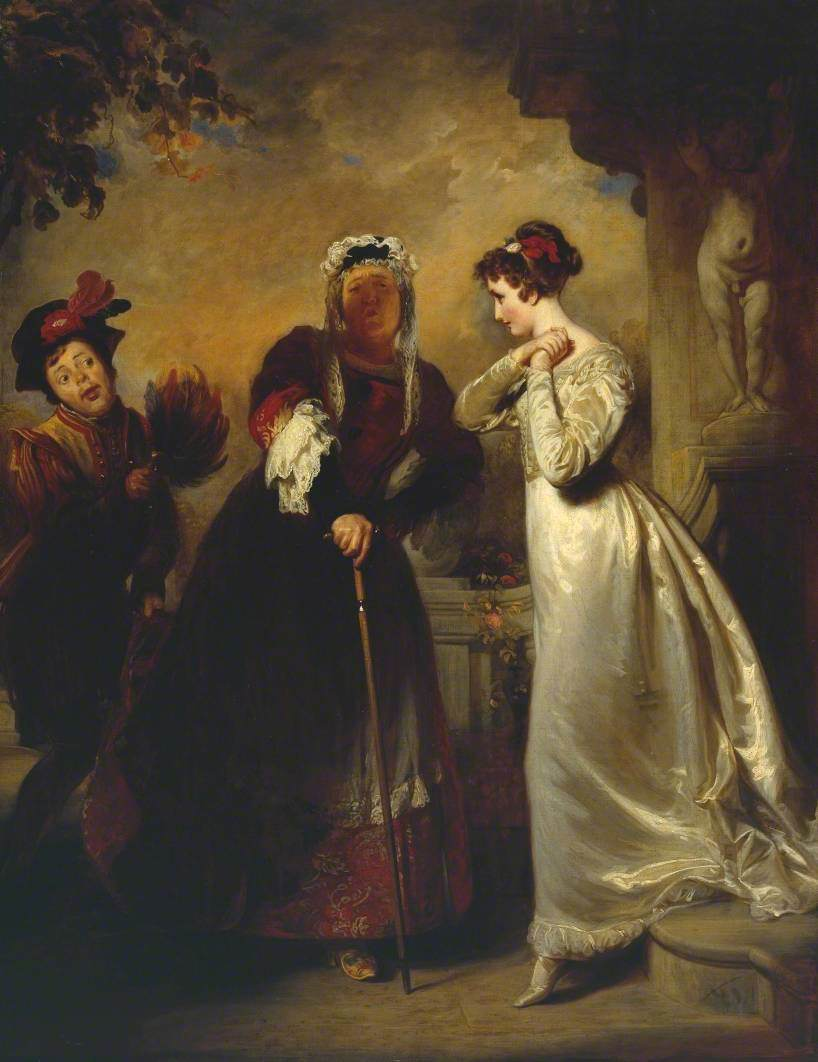
Juliet and Her Nurse, 1827

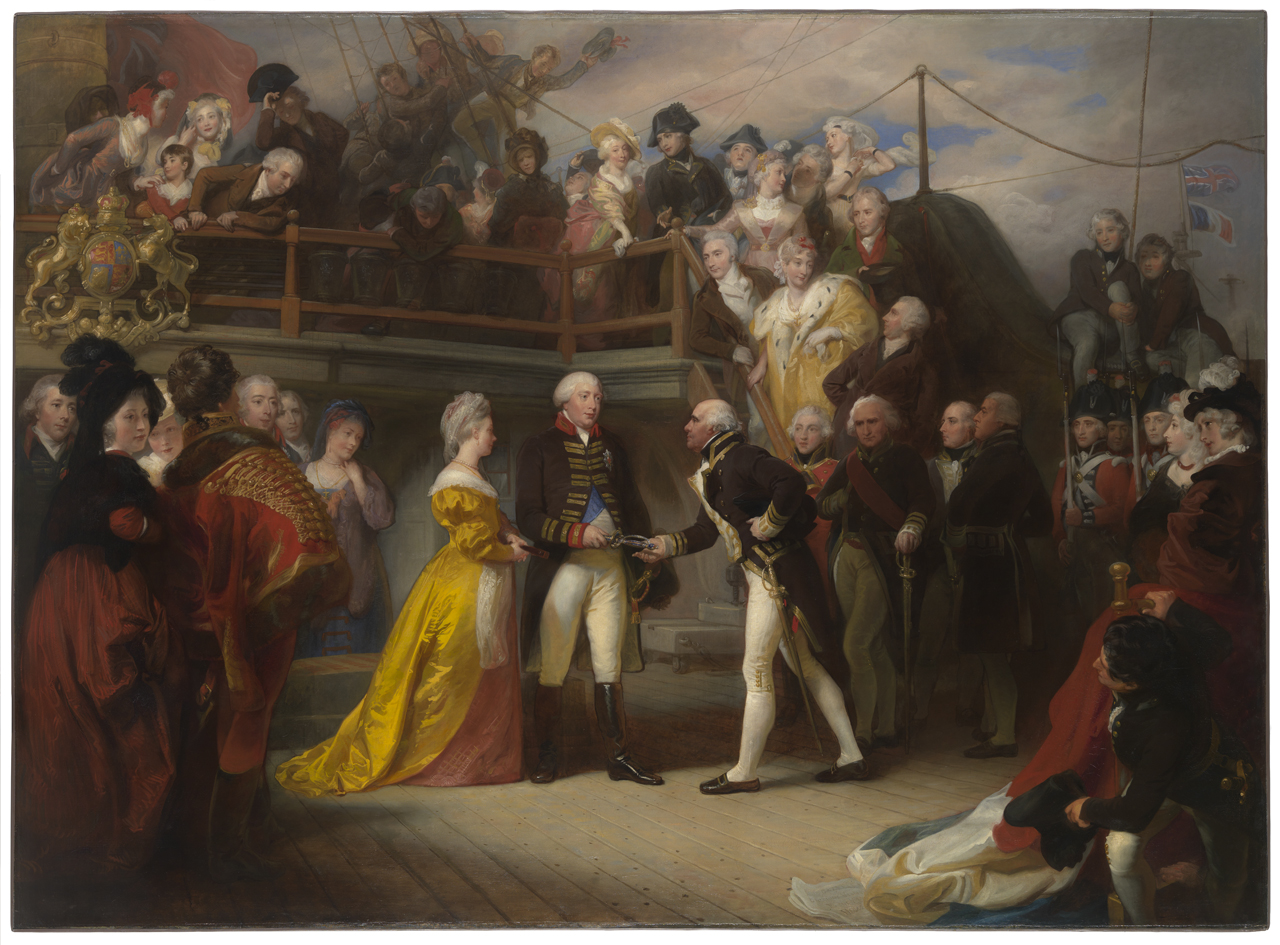
Visit of George III to Howe's Flagship the Queen Charlotte, 1828

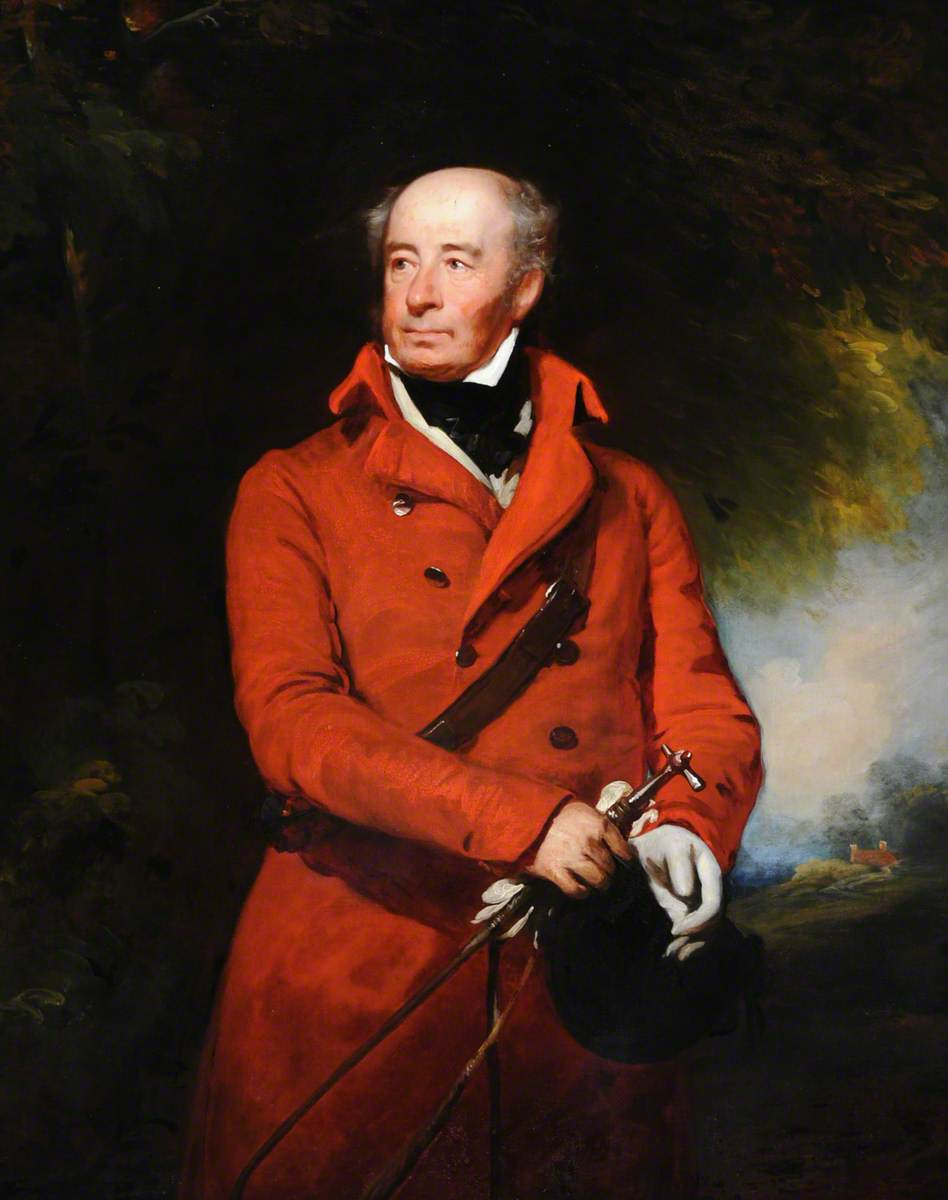
Thomas Lee of Barnstaple, 1829

Portrait of Samuel Rush Meyrick, 1829

Fanny Kemble and Sarah Siddons, 1830

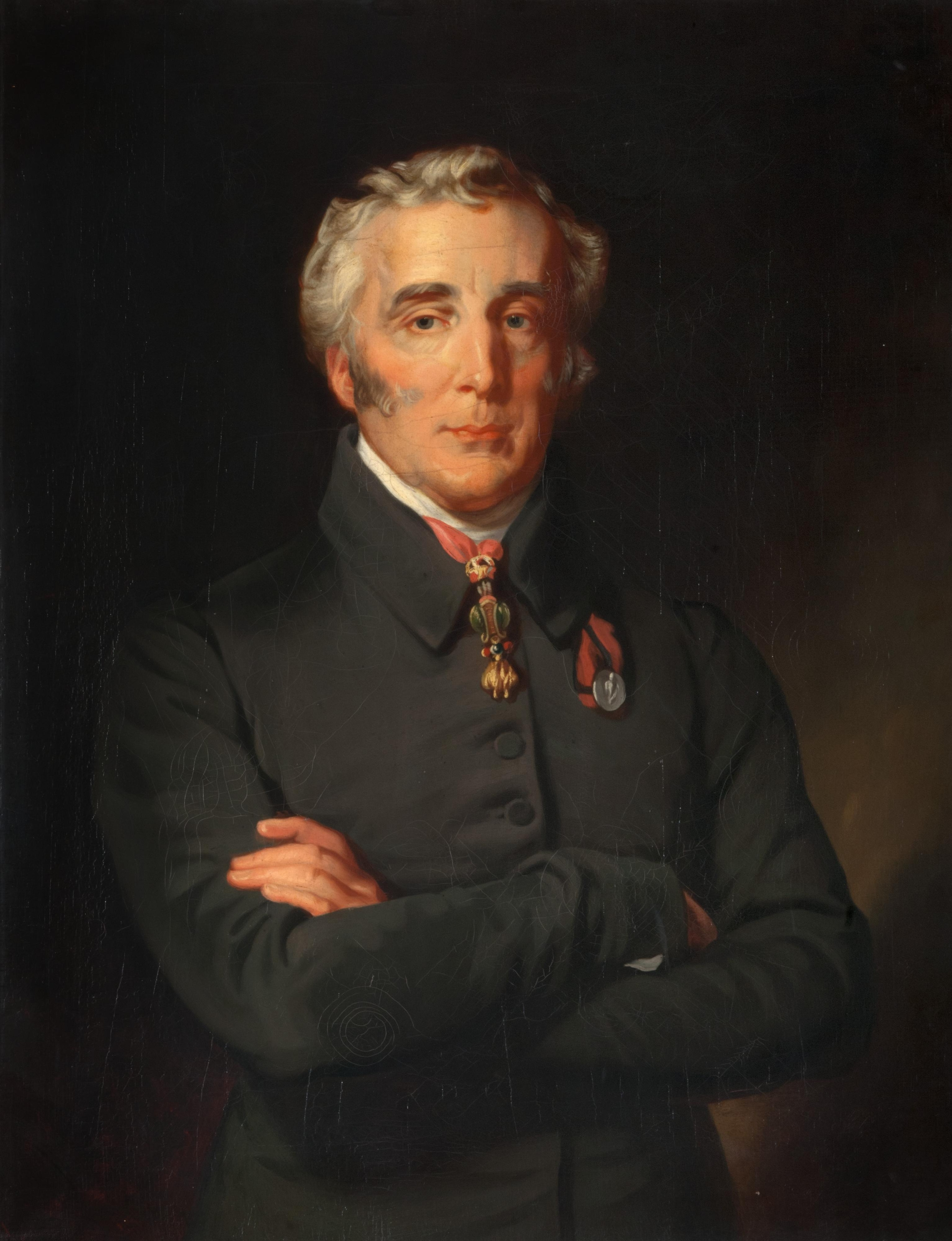
Duke of Wellington, 1837

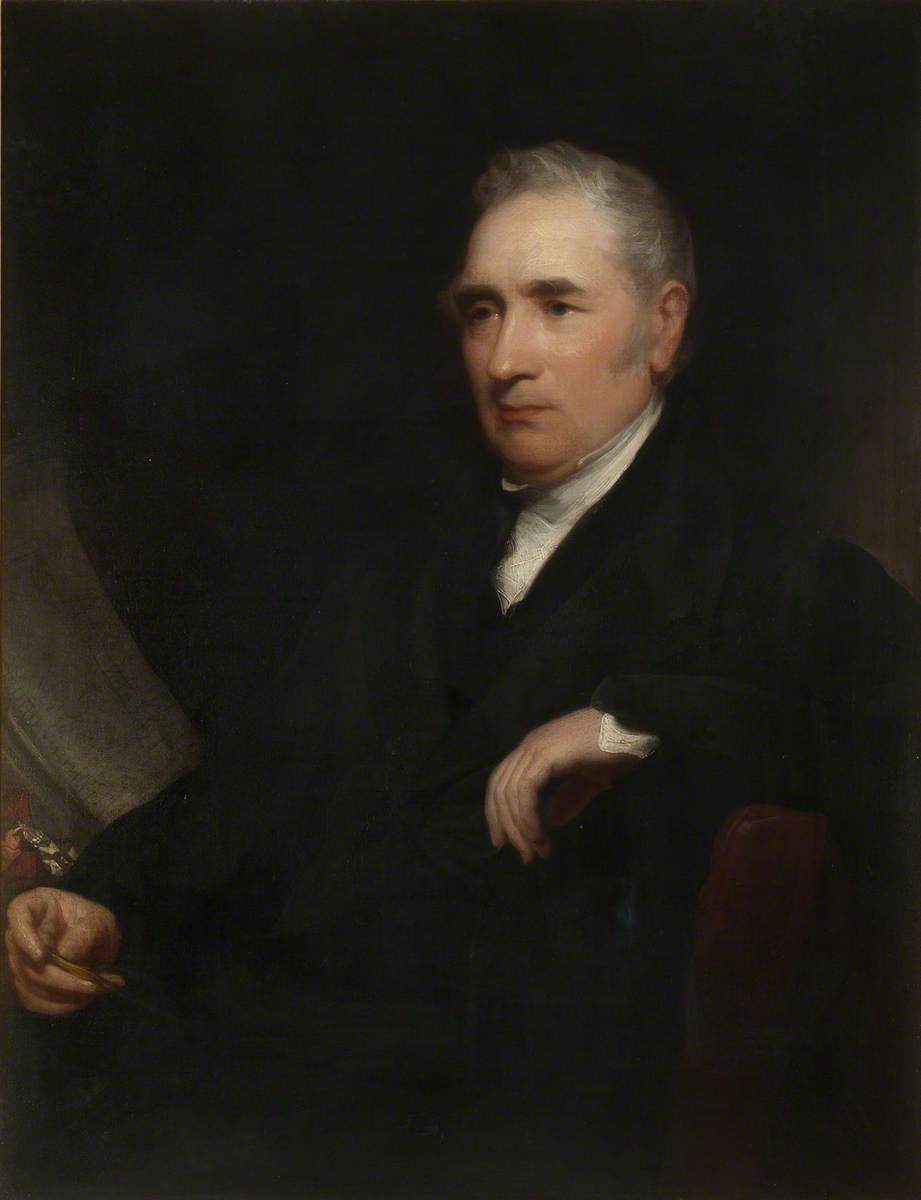
George Stephenson, 1838

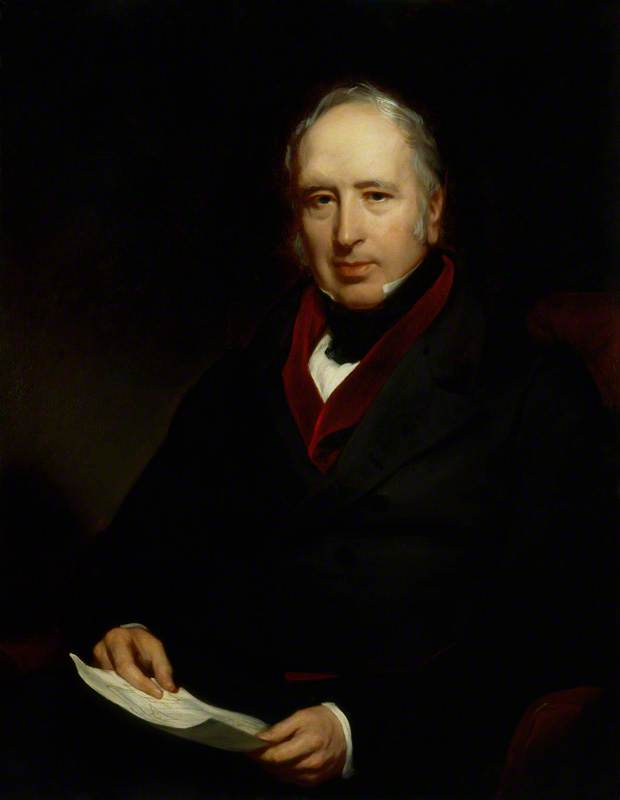
George Cayley, 1840

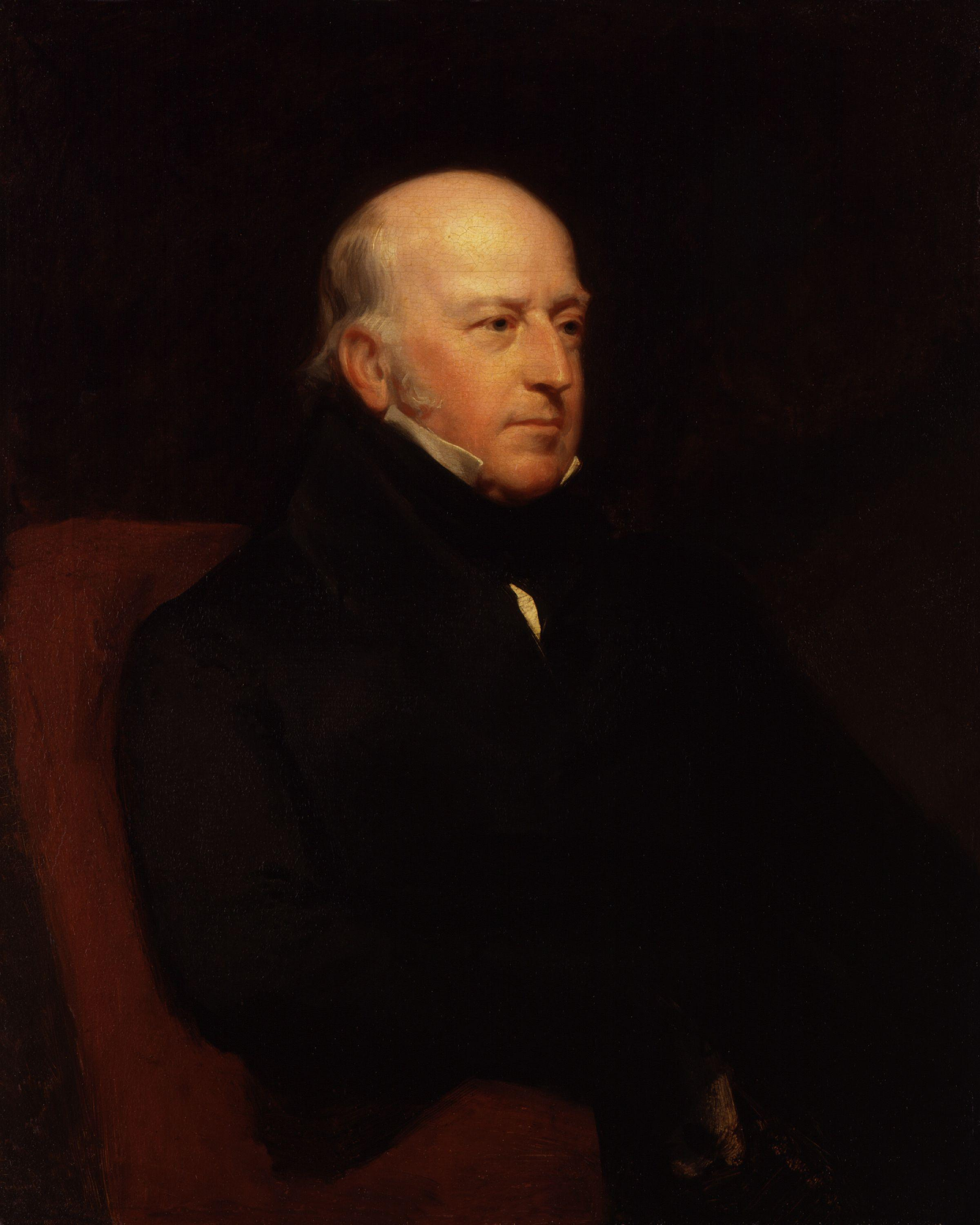
Edward Codrington, 1843
