= 1831 in art =

Events from the year 1831 in art.

== Events ==
- May 1 - The Salon of 1831 opens in Paris.
- May 2 – The Royal Academy Exhibition of 1831 opens at Somerset House in London
- June 21 – The North Carolina State House is razed in a blaze and therein the roof collapses on Antonio Canova's 1820 statue of George Washington, smashing it to pieces.
- October 29–31 – The 1831 Bristol riots in England are observed by local artist William James Müller who paints a series of sketches of the city in flames.
- December – Clarkson Stanfield's spectacular panorama Venice and Its Adjacent Islands is staged in London as part of the annual Christmas pantomime.
- date unknown
  - John Constable, in charge of hanging the Royal Academy of Arts' annual exhibition in London, at the last minute gives his own Salisbury Cathedral from the Meadows a prominent position in place of J. M. W. Turner's Caligula's Palace and Bridge.
  - Publication of John Martin's mezzotint illustrations to The Bible begins.
  - The New Society of Painters in Water Colours is established in London.

== Works ==
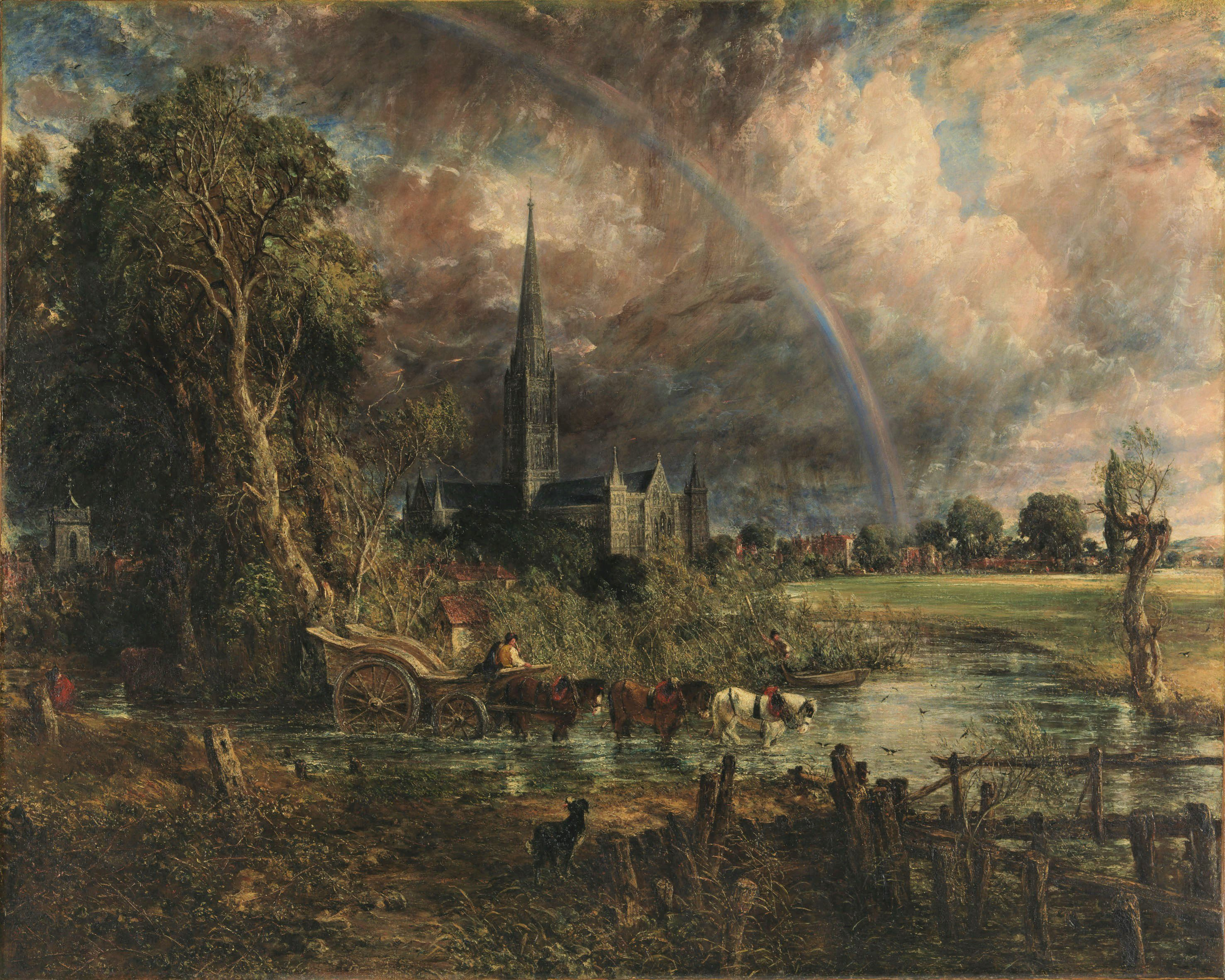
Constable – Salisbury Cathedral from the Meadows

- Joseph Beaume – The Attack on the City Hall of Paris
- William Beechey – Princess Adelaide of Saxe-Meiningen
- Karl Blechen – Tivoli Gardens at the Villa d'Este
- Léon Cogniet – Jean-François Champollion
- John Constable – Salisbury Cathedral from the Meadows
- Massimo d'Azeglio – The Battle of Legnano
- Eugène Delacroix – A Young Tiger Playing with its Mother
- Paul Delaroche – King Edward V and the Duke of York in the Tower of London
- Alexandre-Jean Dubois-Drahonet – Portrait of the Marchioness of Londonderry
- William Etty – Window in Venice During a Festa
- Caspar David Friedrich - The Great Enclosure
- François Gérard – Portrait of Alphonse de Lamartine
- Francesco Hayez
  - Portrait of Cristina Trivulzio Belgiojoso
  - Rebecca at the Well
  - The Refugees of Parga
- Hiroshige – Famous Places in the Eastern Capital
- Eugène Isabey – The Port of Dunkirk
- Edwin Landseer – A Distinguished Member of the Humane Society
- Charles Robert Leslie – My Uncle Toby and the Widow Wadman
- Ivan Martos – Alexander I Statue in Taganrog
- William Mulready – Cargill and Touchwood
- James Northcote – Chess Players
- Henry William Pickersgill – Portrait of Edward Bulwer-Lytton
- David Roberts – Rouen Cathedral
- Camille Roqueplan – Coast Scene with Figures
- Clarkson Stanfield – Portsmouth Harbour
- J.M.W. Turner
  - Caligula's Palace and Bridge
  - Lifeboat and Manby Apparatus Going Off to a Stranded Vessel
  - Van Tromp's Barge Entering the Texel
- Joseph von Führich – Triumph of Christ (Raczyński Palace, Berlin)
- Richard Westmacott – "The Copper Horse" (equestrian statue of George III of the United Kingdom, Windsor Great Park)

== Births ==
- February 23 – Hendrik Willem Mesdag, Dutch marine painter (died 1915)
- March 12 – Benjamin Williams Leader (born Benjamin Leader Williams), English landscape painter (died 1923)
- July 3 – Jacques Émile Édouard Brandon, French artist (died 1897)
- July 21 – Martha Maxwell, American naturalist and artist (died 1881)
- July 28 – J. L. K. van Dort, Ceylonese illustrator (died 1898)
- August 14 – Adolf von Becker, Finnish-born painter (died 1909)
- October 26 – Nathaniel Hone the Younger, Irish painter (died 1917)
- October 31 – Paul Durand-Ruel, French art dealer (died 1922)
- December 7 – Joanna Mary Boyce, English painter (died 1861)

== Deaths ==
- January 6 – Ryōkan, Japanese Sōtō Zen Buddhist monk poet and calligrapher (born 1758)
- February 2 – Vincenzo Dimech, Maltese sculptor (born 1768)
- February 17 – William Armfield Hobday, English portrait painter and miniaturist (born 1771)
- March 22 – John Warwick Smith, British watercolour landscape painter and illustrator (born 1749)
- April 8 – Domenico Aspari, Italian painter and engraver (born 1746)
- May 8 – Emanuel Thelning, Swedish-born, Finnish painter (born 1767)
- May 24 – James Peale, American miniaturist and still-life painter, a younger brother of Charles Willson Peale (born 1749)
- May 25 – Mather Brown, portrait and historical painter (born 1761)
- June 1 – John Jackson, English portrait painter (born 1778)
- June 12 – Pierre Cartellier, French sculptor (born 1757)
- June 18 – Francesco Manno, Italian painter and architect (born 1754)
- July 11 – Richard Duppa, English writer and draughtsman (born 1770)
- July 13 – James Northcote, English painter (born 1746)
- August 5 – Richard Collins, English chief miniature and enamel painter to George III (born 1755)
- August 17 – Patrick Nasmyth, Scottish landscape painter (born 1787)
- August 27 – François Dumont, French painter of portrait miniatures (born 1751)
- September 15 – Christian David Gebauer, Danish animal painter and etcher (born 1777)
- September 17 – Joseph Lange, actor and amateur painter (born 1751)
- November 5 – Johan Frederik Clemens, Danish etcher and printmaker (born 1749)
- November 19 – Carl Conjola, German landscape painter (born 1773)
- December 17 – Amalia von Helvig, German and Swedish artist, writer, translator, and influential intellectual (born 1776)
