= Vision of Medea =

Painting by J. M. W. Turner

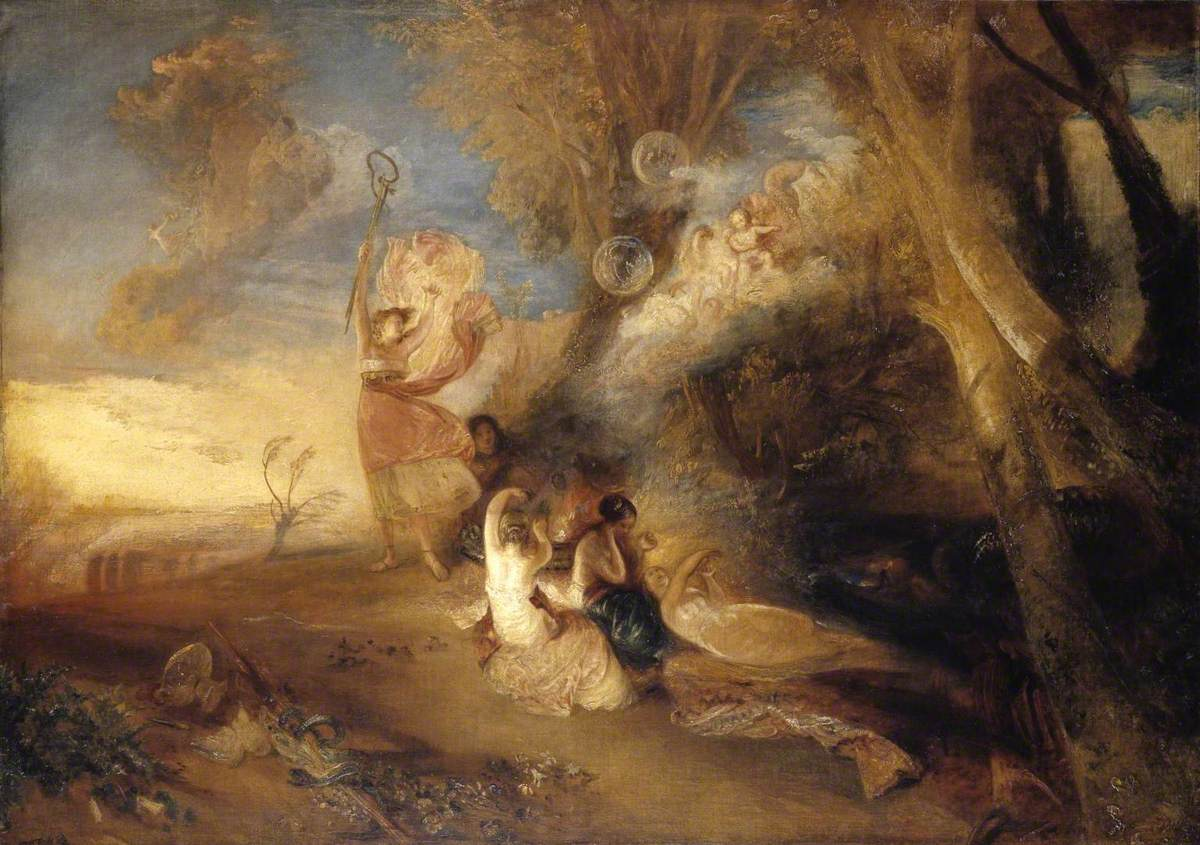
- Artist: J. M. W. Turner
- Year: 1828
- Type: Oil on canvas, landscape painting
- Dimensions: 173.7 cm × 248.9 cm (68.4 in × 98.0 in)
- Location: Tate Britain, London
- Website: tate.org.uk/...n00513

Vision of Medea is an 1828 oil painting by the British artist J.M.W. Turner combining elements of landscape and history painting. It features a scene based on Greek Mythology with Medea gathering ingredients to cast a spell after she has been rejected by Jason, the leader of the Argonauts.

It was produced while Turner was visiting Italy and was first shown in a mini-exhibition in his artist's studio at the Palazzo Trulli in Rome. Although he hoped to display it at the Royal Academy's Summer Exhibition of 1829 at Somerset House, it did not arrive from Italy in time. Two years later it was displayed at the Royal Academy Exhibition of 1831 where it hung to one side of John Constable's Salisbury Cathedral from the Meadows, sandwiching it between another Turner picture Caligula's Palace and Bridge.

Today the painting is in the collection of the Tate Britain in London having been part of the Turner Bequest of 1856.

== See also ==
- List of paintings by J. M. W. Turner
- Jason, an 1802 work by Turner

== Bibliography ==
- Bailey, Anthony. J.M.W. Turner: Standing in the Sun. Tate Enterprises, 2013.
- Costello, Leo. J.M.W. Turner and the Subject of History. Routledge, 2017.
- Finley, Gerald. Angel in the Sun; Turner's Vision of History. McGill-Queen's University Press, 1999.
- Hamilton, James. Constable: A Portrait. Hachette UK, 2022.
- Hamilton, James. Turner - A Life. Sceptre, 1998.
- Reynolds, Graham. Turner. Thames & Hudson, 2022.
