= Alexandrovskaya Square =

City square of Taganrog

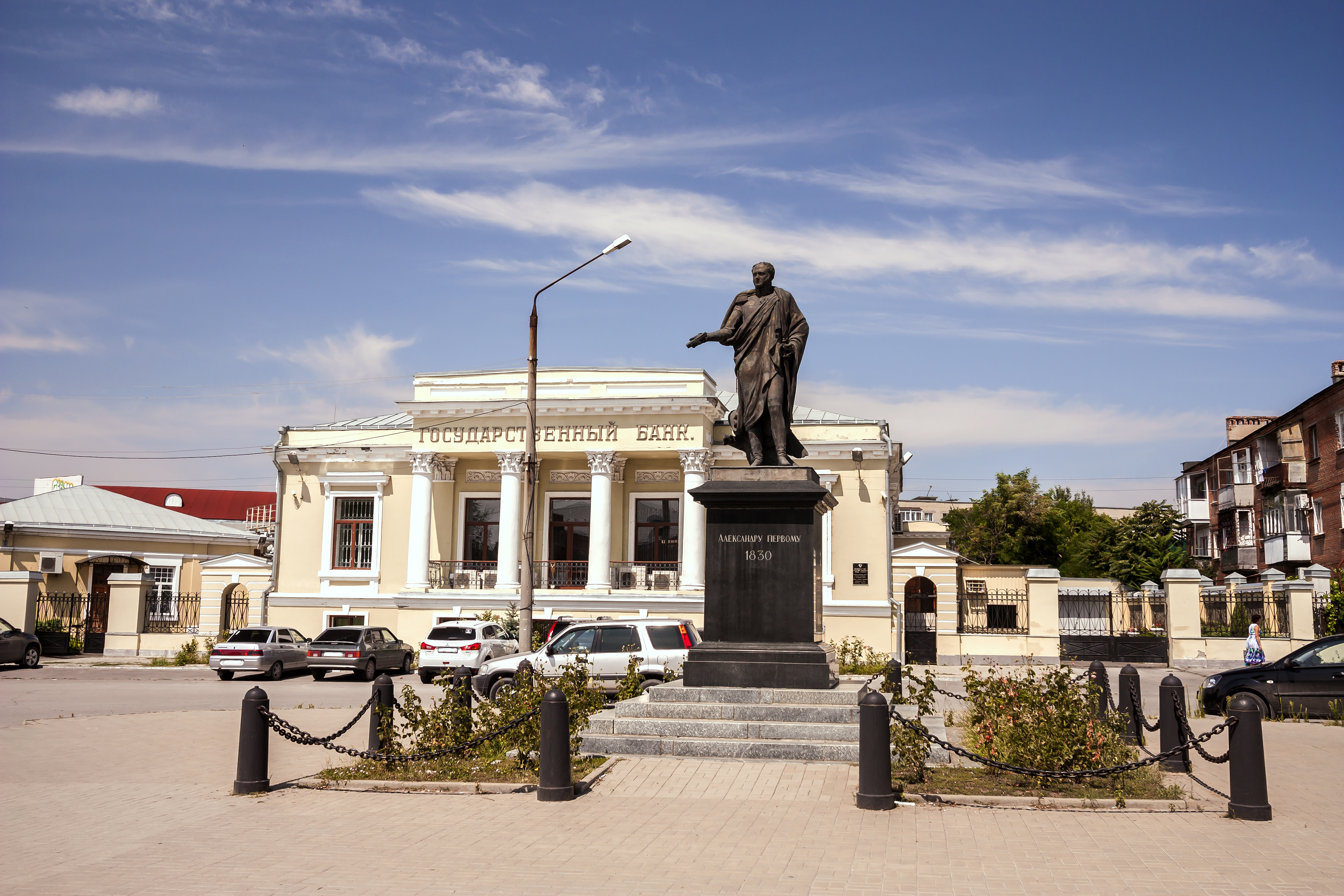
- Interactive map of Alexandrovskaya Square
- Location: Taganrog, Russia
- Coordinates: 47.1242°N 38.5636°E

Alexandrovskaya Square (Russian: Александровская площадь) is a city square of Taganrog.

== Architecture ==
The architectural dominant of the Bank Square initially was the Alexander Nevsky Jerusalem Greek Monastery, which was founded in 1814. The monastic church was built according to the project of Greek architects in the Neo-Byzantine style.

In 1825, Russian Emperor Alexander I suddenly died in Taganrog, his embalmed body was being held in the monastery from December 2 to 29. In 1831, at the request of Taganrog citizens, the Monument to Alexander I was erected on the square in front of the monastery. In 1855 a square was built around the monument.

On the other three corners of the square there were mansions. Later, in their place, the buildings of the City Public Bank (1863), the Taganrog Branch of the St. Petersburg Accounting Bank (1895) and the Stock Exchange Society (1910s) were built at different times. In the 1920s the monastery was closed and demolished.

In 1932, the Monument to Alexander I was demolished and sent for remelting, and its pedestal was used for another monument dedicated to "Warriors of the Revolution", installed in the old city cemetery.

In 1998, on the year of the 300th anniversary of Taganrog, the monument to the Emperor with minor changes was restored and returned to its initial place.
