= Jason (painting) =

Painting by J. M. W. Turner

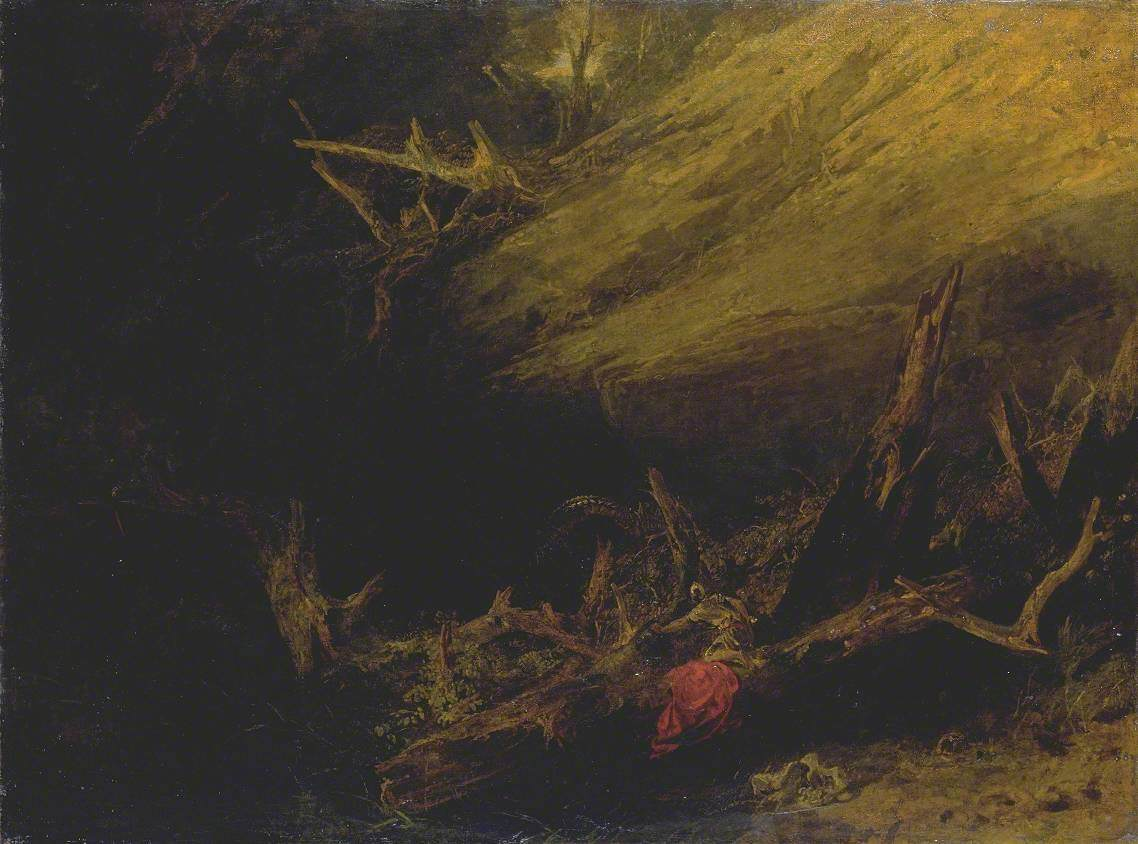
- Artist: J.M.W. Turner
- Year: 1802
- Type: Oil on canvas, history painting
- Dimensions: 119.7 cm × 90.2 cm (47.1 in × 35.5 in)
- Location: Tate Britain, London
- Website: www.tate.org.uk/...n00471

Jason is an 1802 history painting by the British artist J.M.W. Turner. It depicts a scene from the story of Jason and his quest for the Golden Fleece. It was one of a number of works Turner produced inspired by the Ancient World and in this case he based it on a recent translation of the poem Argonautica by Apollonius of Rhodes. It portrays Jason in Colchis preparing to fight a dragon as part of his quest.

The work was displayed at the Royal Academy's Summer Exhibition of 1802 at Somerset House, one of four oil paintings he exhibited in his first appearance as a full academician. In 1815 he also sent it to the inaugural exhibition of the Plymouth Institution. Today the painting is in the collection of the Tate Britain in London, having been part of the Turner Bequest of 1856.

== See also ==
- List of paintings by J. M. W. Turner
- Vision of Medea, an 1828 work by Turner

== Bibliography ==
- Bailey, Anthony. J.M.W. Turner: Standing in the Sun. Tate Enterprises Ltd, 2013.
- Hamilton, James. Turner - A Life. Sceptre, 1998.
