= Uncle Toby and the Widow Wadman =

Painting by William Powell Frith

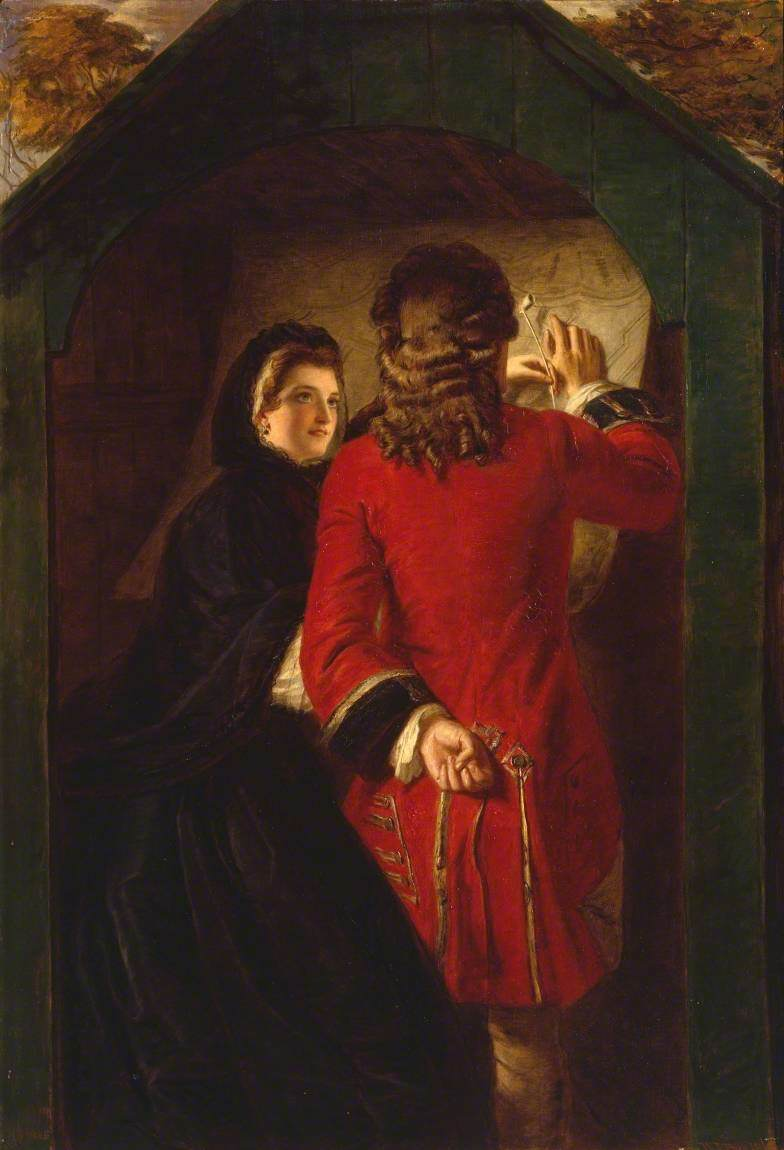
- Artist: William Powell Frith
- Year: 1865
- Type: Oil on canvas, genre painting
- Dimensions: 52.1 cm × 75.6 cm (20.5 in × 29.8 in)
- Location: Tate Britain, London

Uncle Toby and the Widow Wadman is an 1865 oil painting by the British artist William Powell Frith. It features a scene from the Georgian era novel The Life and Opinions of Tristram Shandy, Gentleman by Laurence Sterne. The picture presents the moment that the Widow Wadman, who schemes to attract the previously indifferent Captain Shandy by pretending she has a something in her eye. Her strategy is successful and he falls head-over-heels in love with her.

The painting was displayed at the Royal Academy Exhibition of 1866 held at the National Gallery in London. Today it is part of the collection of the Tate Britain, having been bequeathed by the art collector Henry Spencer Ashbee.

== See also ==
- My Uncle Toby and the Widow Wadman, an 1831 painting of the same scene by Charles Robert Leslie

== Bibliography ==
- Gerard, W.B. Laurence Sterne and the Visual Imagination. Taylor & Francis, 2016.
- Noakes, Aubrey. William Frith, Extraordinary Victorian Painter. Jupiter, 1978.
