= Low Life and High Life =

Painting by Edwin Landseer

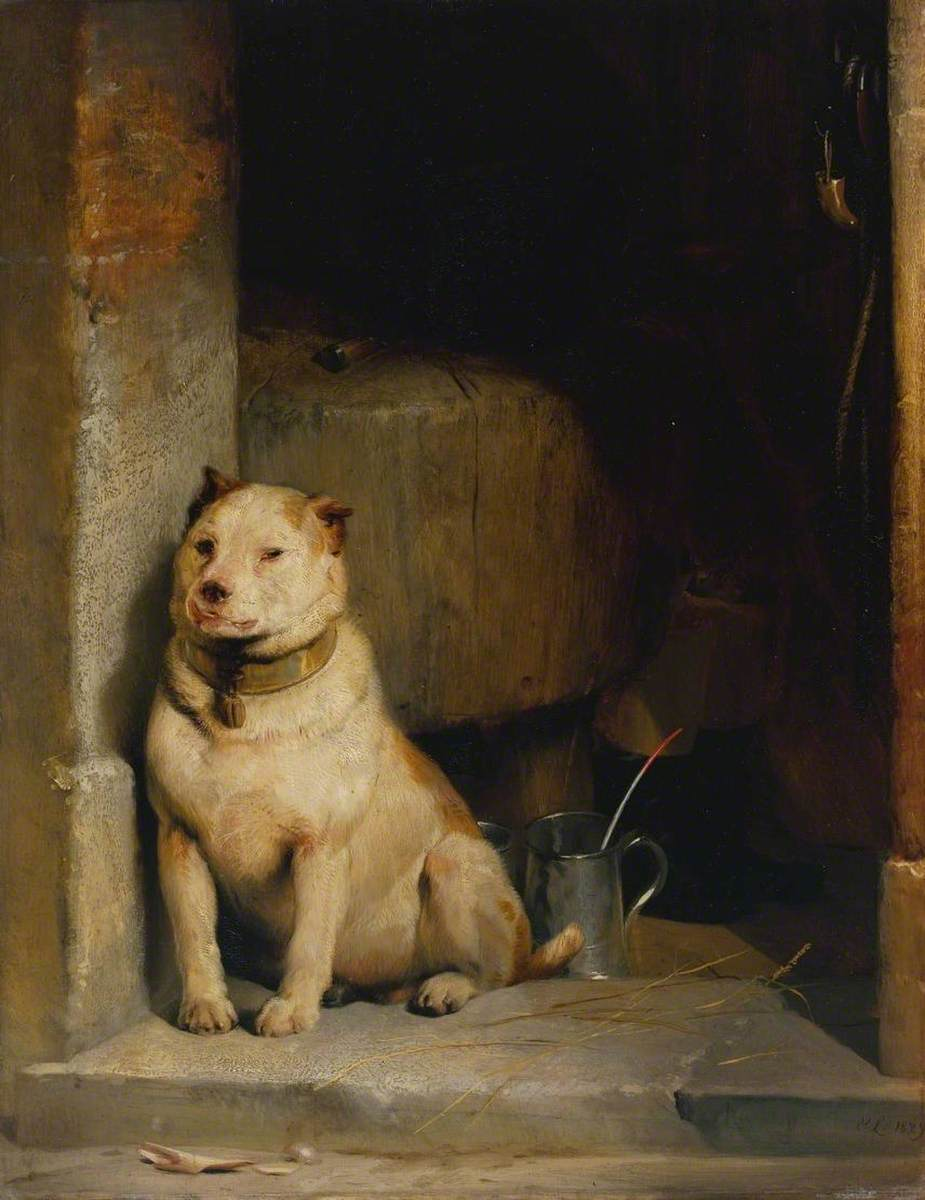
- Artist: Edwin Landseer
- Year: 1829
- Type: Oil on mahogany, genre painting
- Dimensions: 45.7 cm × 35.2 cm (18.0 in × 13.9 in)
- Location: Tate Britain, London

Low Life and High Life are twin 1829 oil paintings by the British artist Edwin Landseer. It depicts the contrasting lifestyles of two dogs in pre-Victorian England. Differing breeds, one of which is shown in a clearly working class setting while the other is in an upper class background. It is part of a long tradition using contrasting images to illustrate class divides in art.

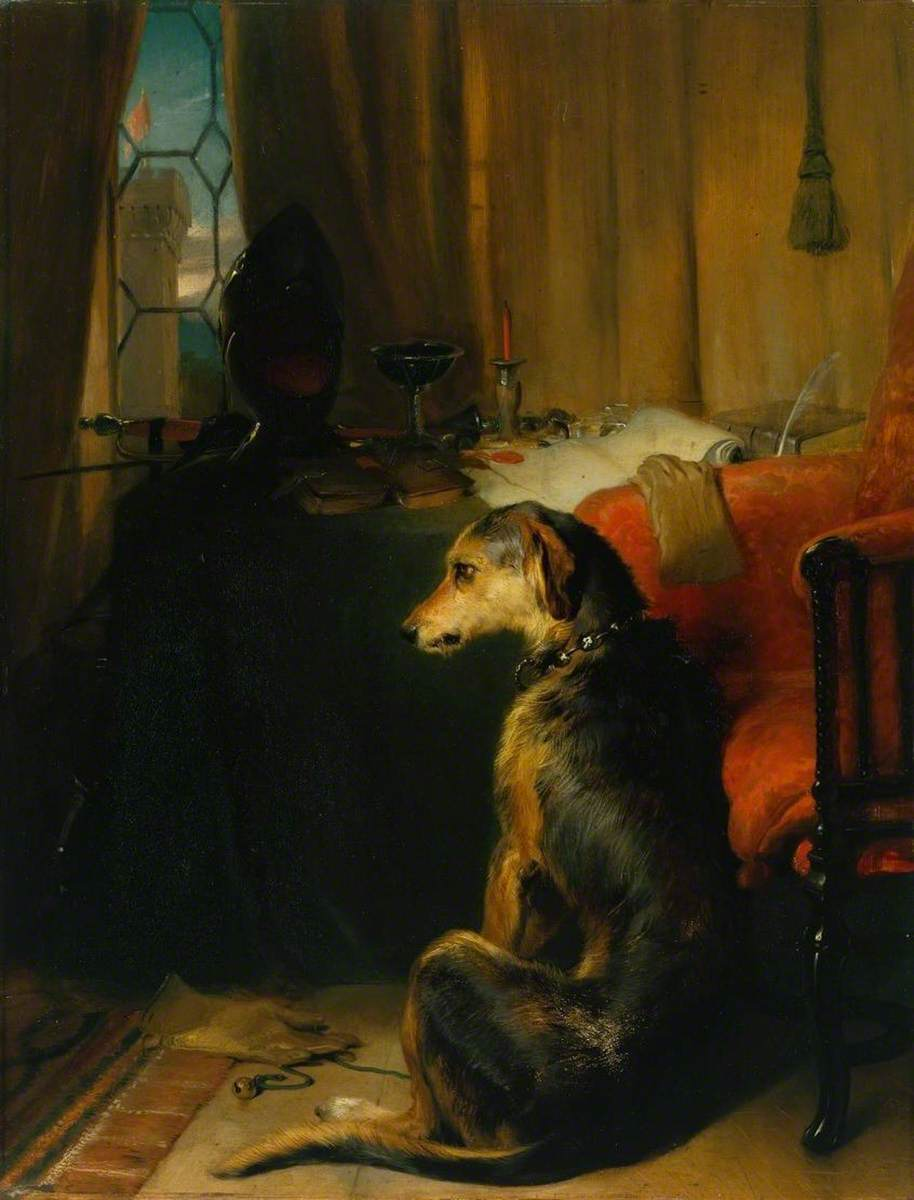
High Life by Edwin Landseer, 1829

Both paintings were displayed at the Royal Academy Exhibition of 1831 at Somerset House in London. Today they are in the collection of the Tate Britain in Pimlico, having been given to the nation by the art collector Robert Vernon in 1847 as part of the large Vernon Gift.

== Bibliography ==
- Donald, Diane. Picturing Animals in Britain, 1750-1850. Yale University Press, 2007.
- Herrmann, Luke. Nineteenth Century British Painting. Charles de la Mare, 2000.
- Ormond, Richard. Sir Edwin Landseer. Philadelphia Museum of Art, 1981.
