= Lifeboat and Manby Apparatus Going Off to a Stranded Vessel =

Painting by J. M. W. Turner

- Artist: J. M. W. Turner
- Year: 1831
- Type: Oil on canvas, landscape painting
- Dimensions: 91.4 cm × 122 cm (36.0 in × 48 in)
- Location: Victoria and Albert Museum, London

Lifeboat and Manby Apparatus Going Off to a Stranded Vessel is an 1831 landscape painting by the British artist J.M.W. Turner. It combines element of maritime and genre painting. In rough weather, a lifeboat is heading out to assist wrecked vessel on the English coast in distress. The full title of the painting is Life-Boat and Manby Apparatus Going Off to a Stranded Vessel Making Signal (Blue Lights) of Distress.

The manby apparatus was invented by George William Manby after he had witnessed a ship in trouble off Great Yarmouth in 1807. The year of Turner's painting he was elected a member of the Royal Society in acknowledgment of the invention. Although never explicitly stated there has been little doubt that the town featured in Turner's painting is Great Yarmouth and for a number of years it was known as Vessel in Distress off Yarmouth. The painting was displayed at the Royal Academy Exhibition of 1831 at Somerset House in London, where Turner's rival John Constable displayed Yarmouth Jetty. The work was acquired by the art collector John Sheepshanks who in 1857 donated it to the Victoria and Albert Museum in South Kensington with the Sheepshanks Gift.

== See also ==
- List of paintings by J. M. W. Turner

== Bibliography ==
- Hamilton, James. Turner - A Life. Sceptre, 1998.
- Reynolds, Graham. Turner. Thames & Hudson, 2022.
- Shenton, Caroline. The Day Parliament Burned Down. Oxford University Press, 2013.
- Tracy, Nicholas. Britannia’s Palette: The Arts of Naval Victory. McGill-Queen's Press, 2007.
