= Royal Academy Exhibition of 1831 =

1831 art exhibition in London

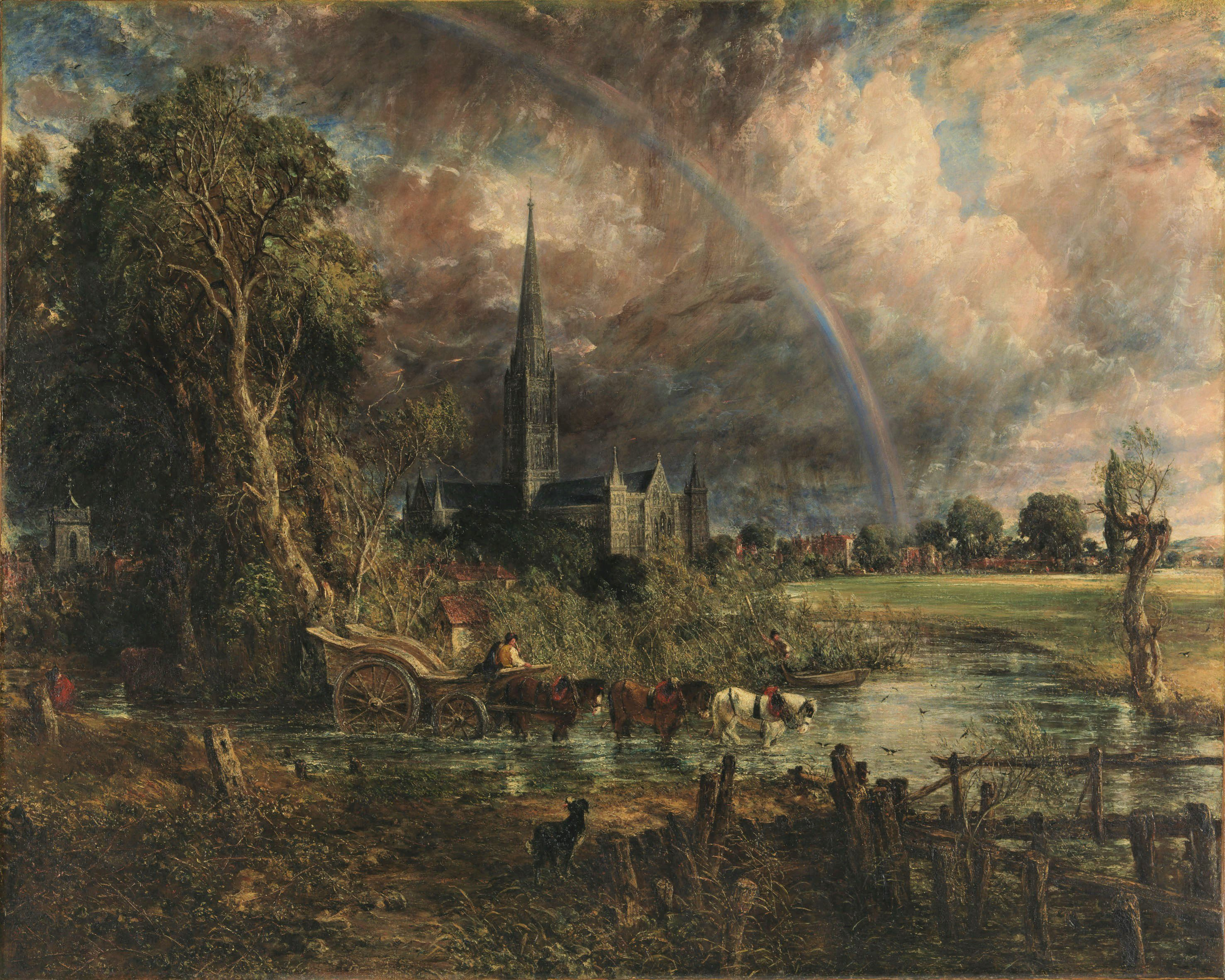
Salisbury Cathedral from the Meadows by John Constable

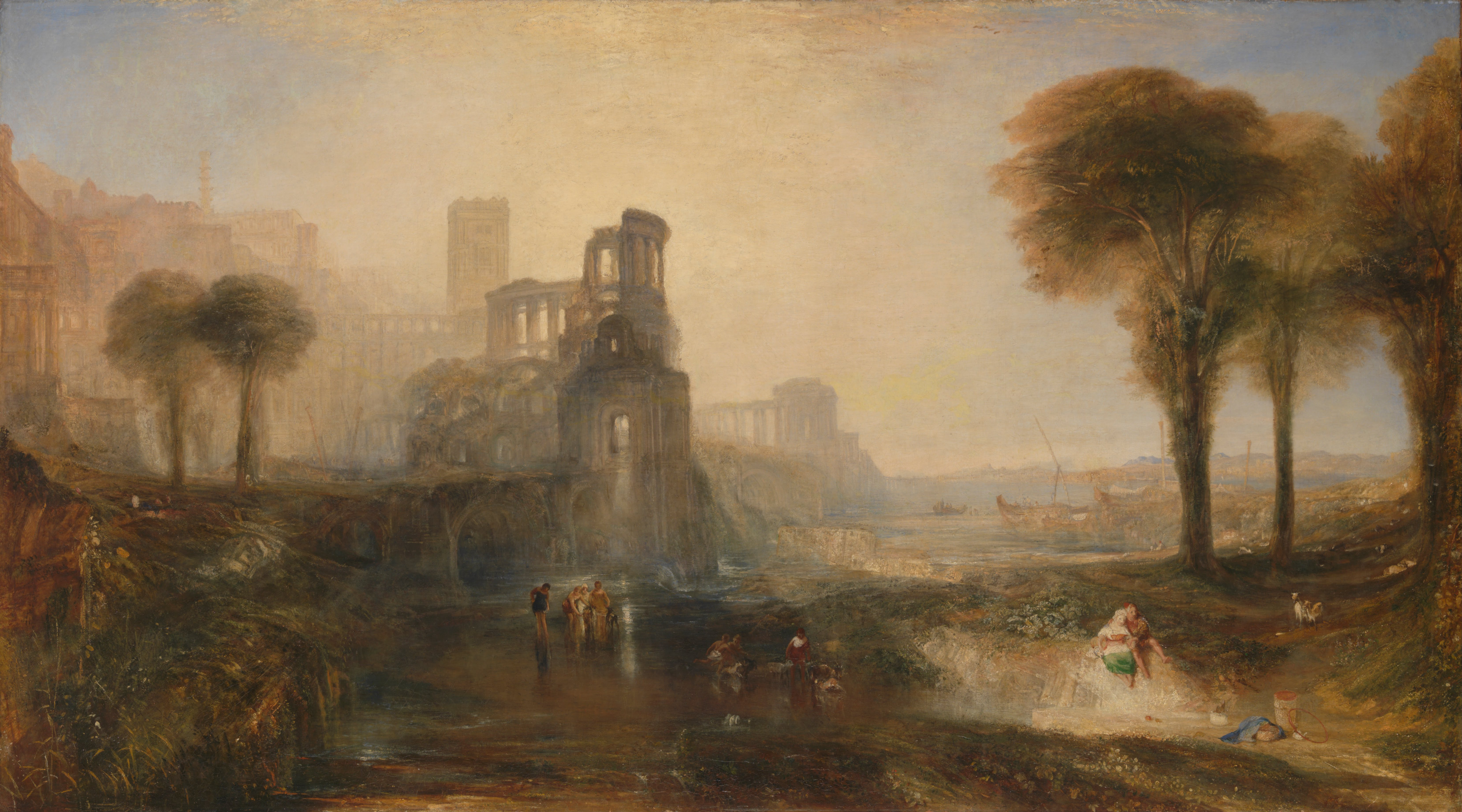
Caligula's Palace and Bridge by Turner

The Royal Academy Exhibition of 1831 was an art exhibition held between 2 May and 16 July at Somerset House in London It was the annual Summer Exhibition of the Royal Academy of Arts. Today it is best remembered for intensifying the developing rivalry between John Constable and J.M.W. Turner.

== Exhibition ==
The Irish portraitist Sir Martin Archer Shee was the President of the Royal Academy having succeeded Thomas Lawrence the previous year. David Wilkie, best known for genre and history paintings, exhibited only portraits this year. William Beechey showed portraits of the new monarch William IV and his wife Queen Adelaide. Henry William Pickersgill displayed a painting depicted the young novelist Edward Bulwer-Lytton.

Amongst other works, William Etty showed Window in Venice and a version of Judith and Holofernes. William Hilton exhibited Sir Calepine Rescuing Serena, part of his series featuring scenes from Edmund Spenser's The Faerie Queen. Charles Robert Leslie also chose a literary source for his My Uncle Toby and the Widow Wadman from the novel Tristram Shandy.

Edwin Landseer was represented by the twin paintings Low Life and High Life showing two dogs with contrasting standards of living. The English-born American artist Thomas Cole exhibited work as he had done the previous year.

=== Constable and Turner ===
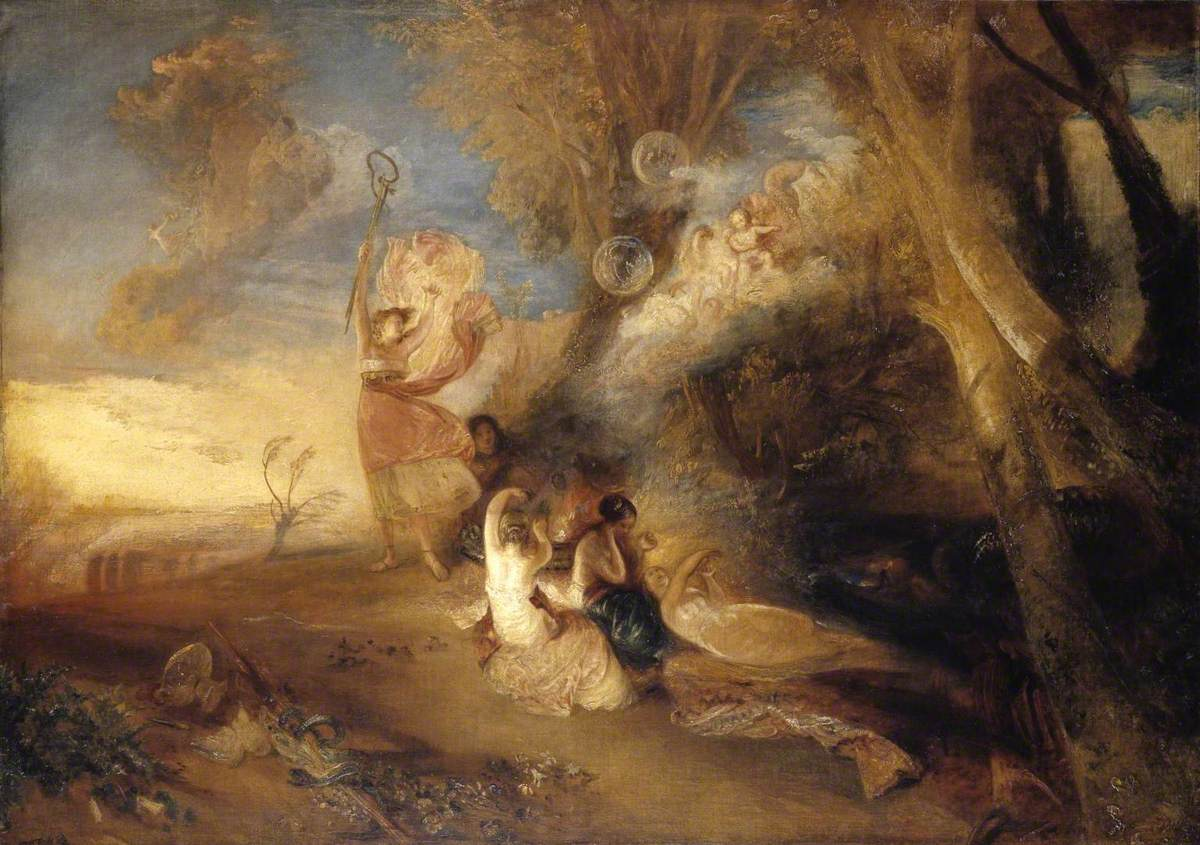
Vision of Medea by Turner

The greatest attention was drawn to three large paintings hanging on one wall of the Great Room where two paintings by J.M.W. Turner with Classical themes Caligula's Palace and Bridge and Vision of Medea were hung either side of John Constable's Salisbury Cathedral from the Meadows.

Constable had served on the hanging committee responsible for placing the works in adjacent positions and David Roberts later reported a public argument between the two men over the issue. While Turner had been a well-known painter for several decades, Constable had been a comparatively minor figure until his major success at the Salon of 1824 in France. Elected as a full member of the academy in 1829, Constable was now being treated as an equivalent status to Turner by the press. (Academy chronicle). The direct comparison of their works led to the observation that they were like fire (Turner) and water (Constable) by the Literary Gazette and other reviewers used similar language.

Turner also displayed five other works at the exhibition. In review The Athenaeum wrote "Turner is admirable" and "Constable is Constable". Their rivalry continued at the following year at the Academy's 1832 Exhibition.

== Gallery ==
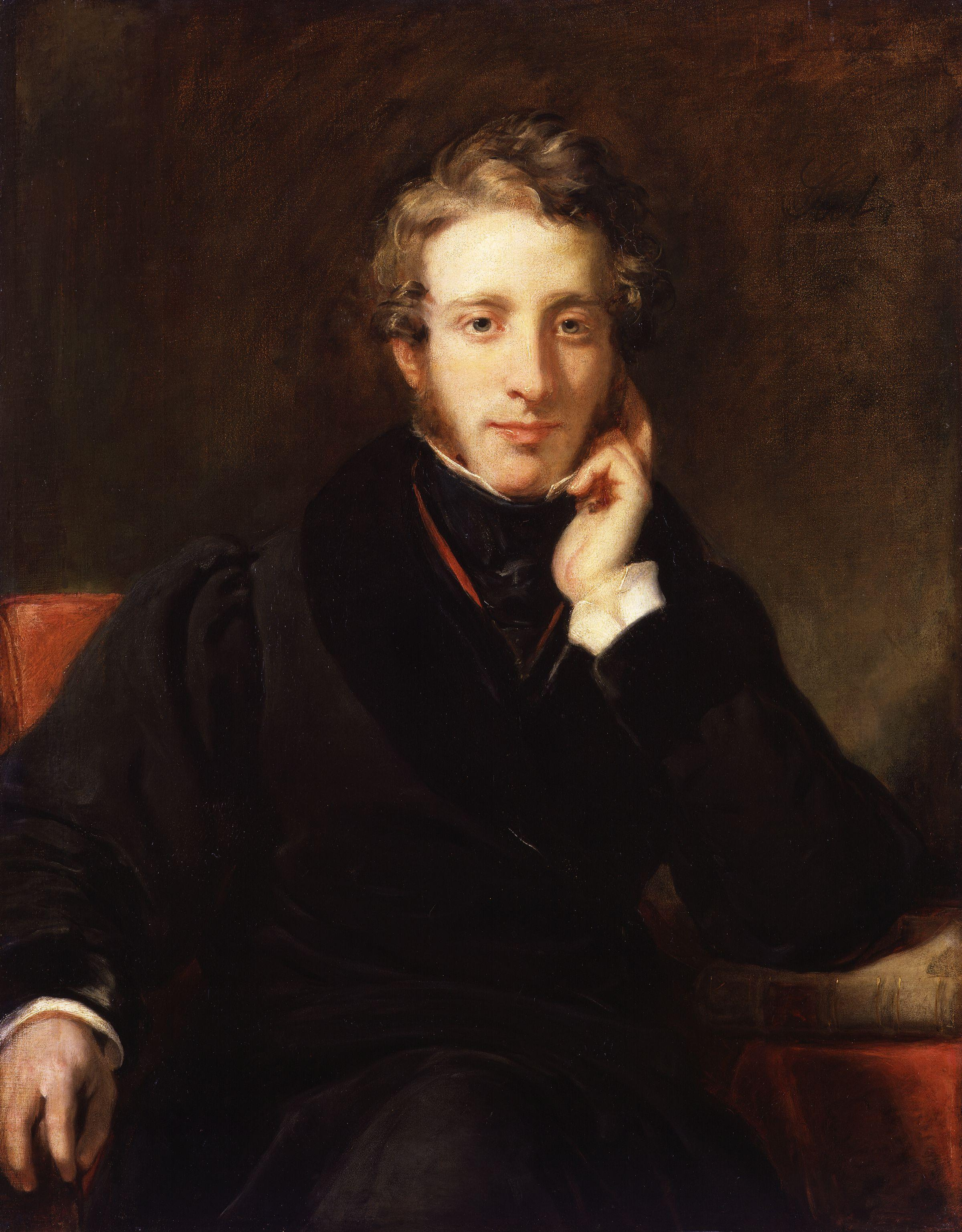
Portrait of Edward Bulwer-Lytton by Henry William Pickersgill

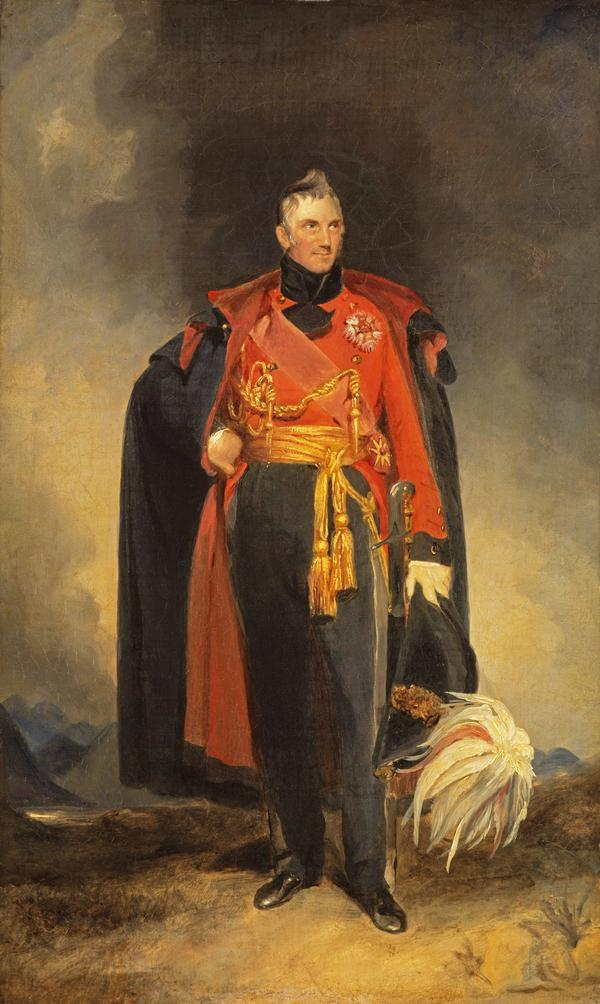
Portrait of George Murray by Henry William Pickersgill

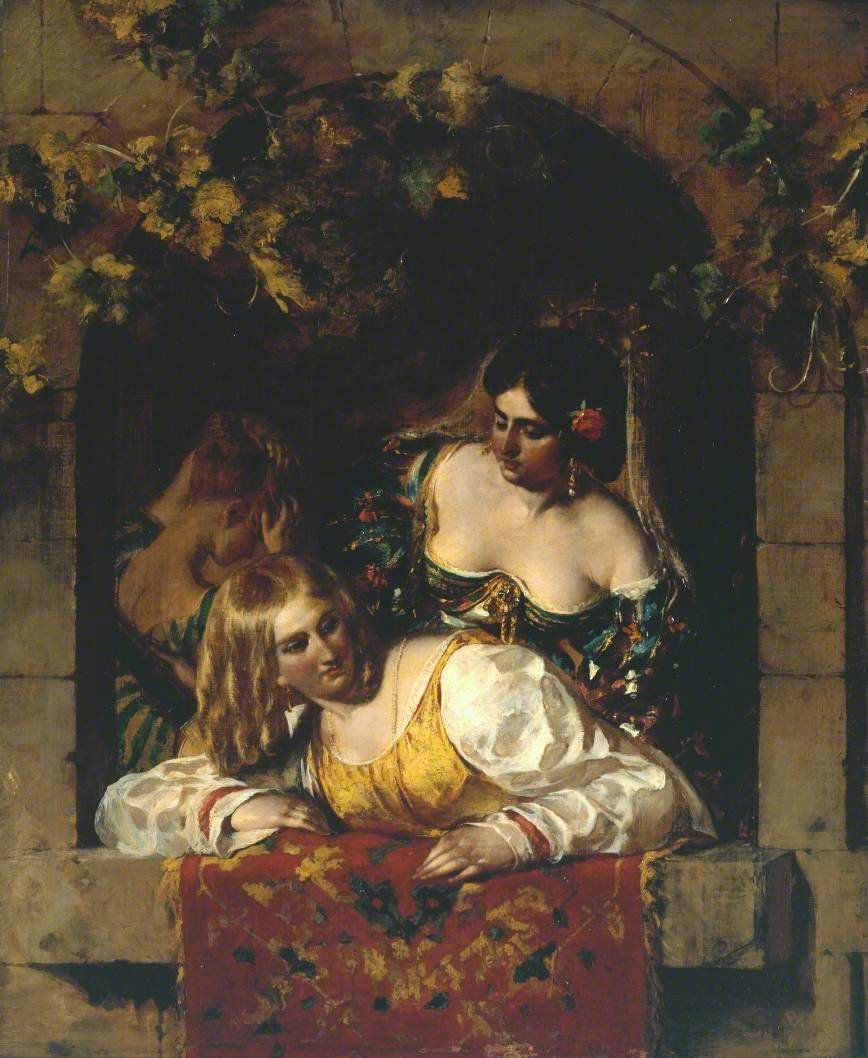
Window in Venice During a Festa by William Etty

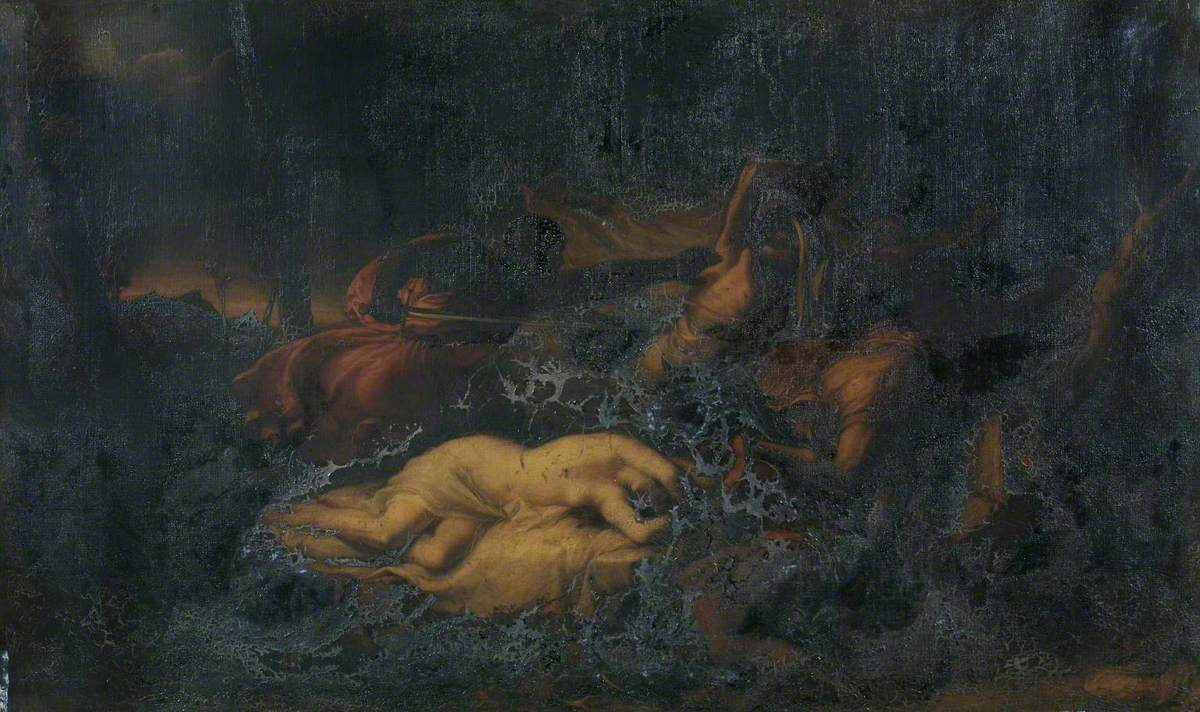
Sir Calepine Rescuing Serena by William Hilton

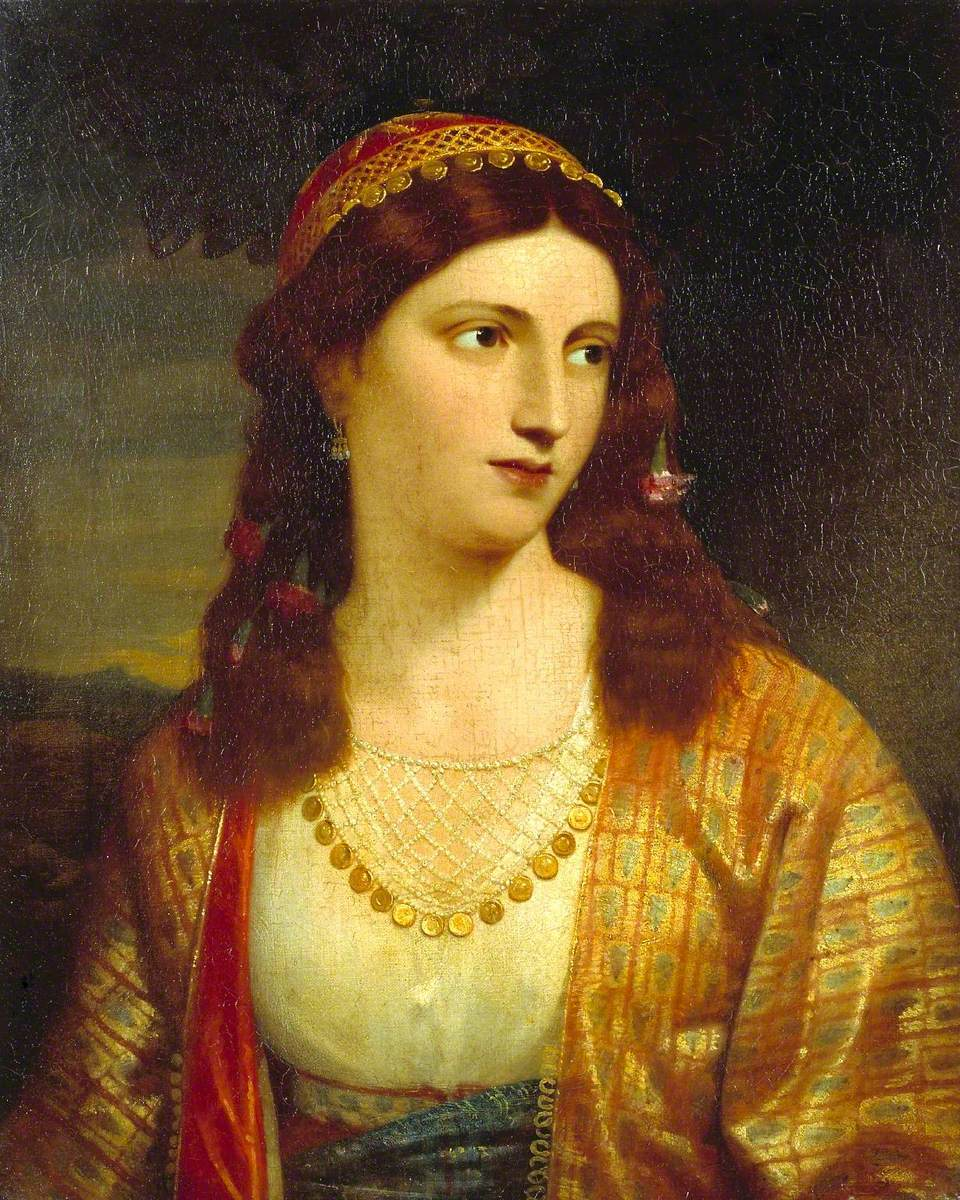
Haidée, a Greek Girl by Charles Lock Eastlake

Lifeboat and Manby Apparatus Going Off to a Stranded Vessel by J.M.W. Turner

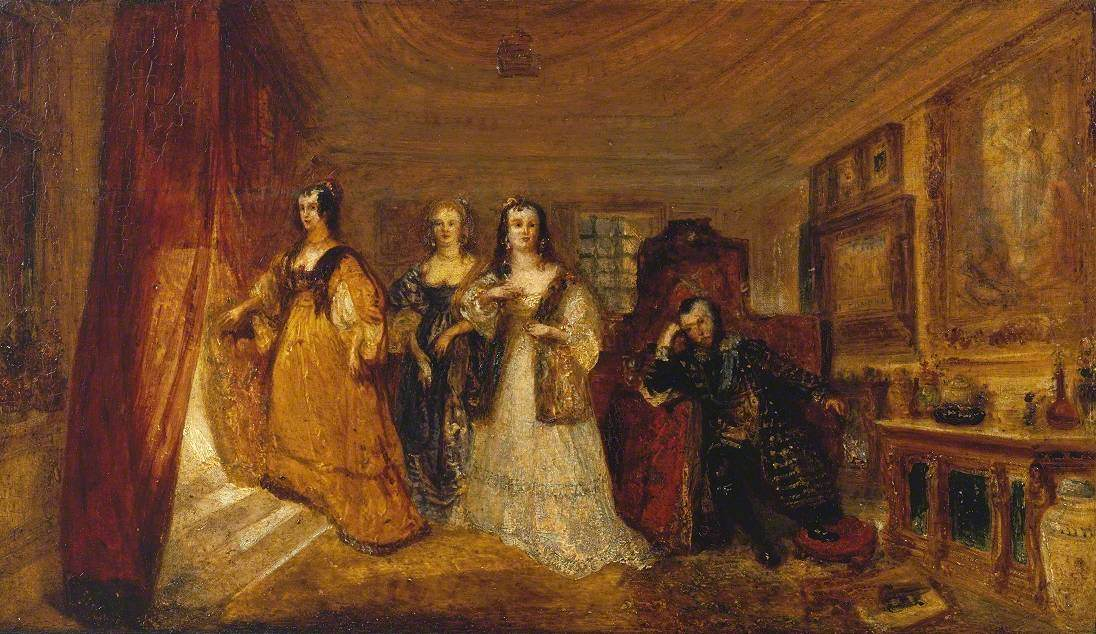
Countess of Carlisle, and Dorothy Percy's Visit to their Father Lord Percy by J.M.W. Turner

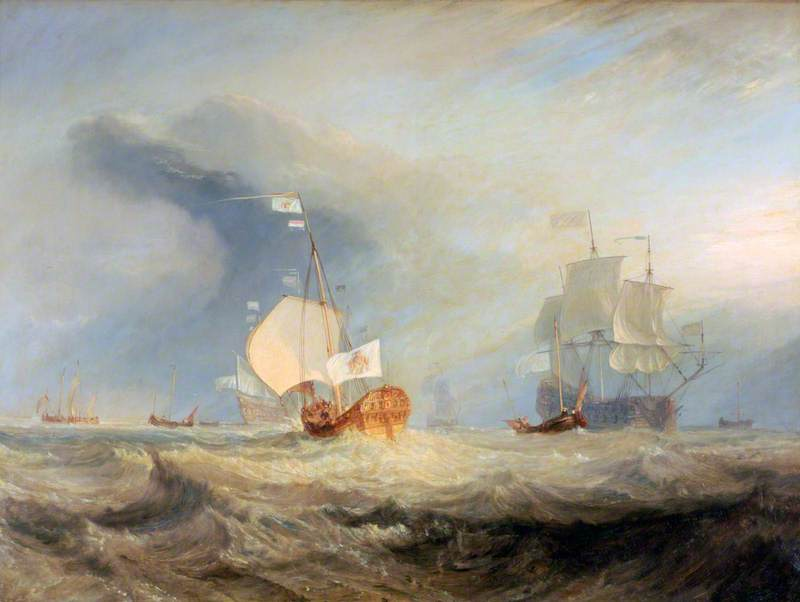
Van Tromp's Barge Entering the Texel by J.M.W. Turner

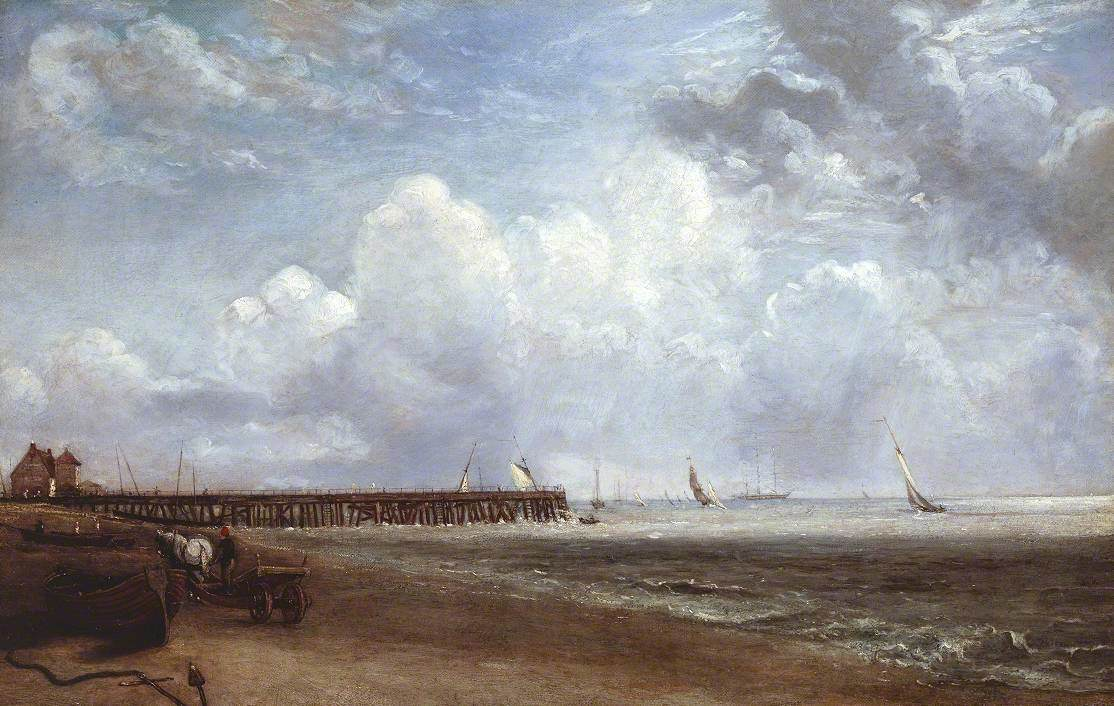
Yarmouth Pier by John Constable

Lord Byron Reposing in the House of a Fisherman Having Swum the Hellespont by William Allan

A Sailing Match by William Mulready

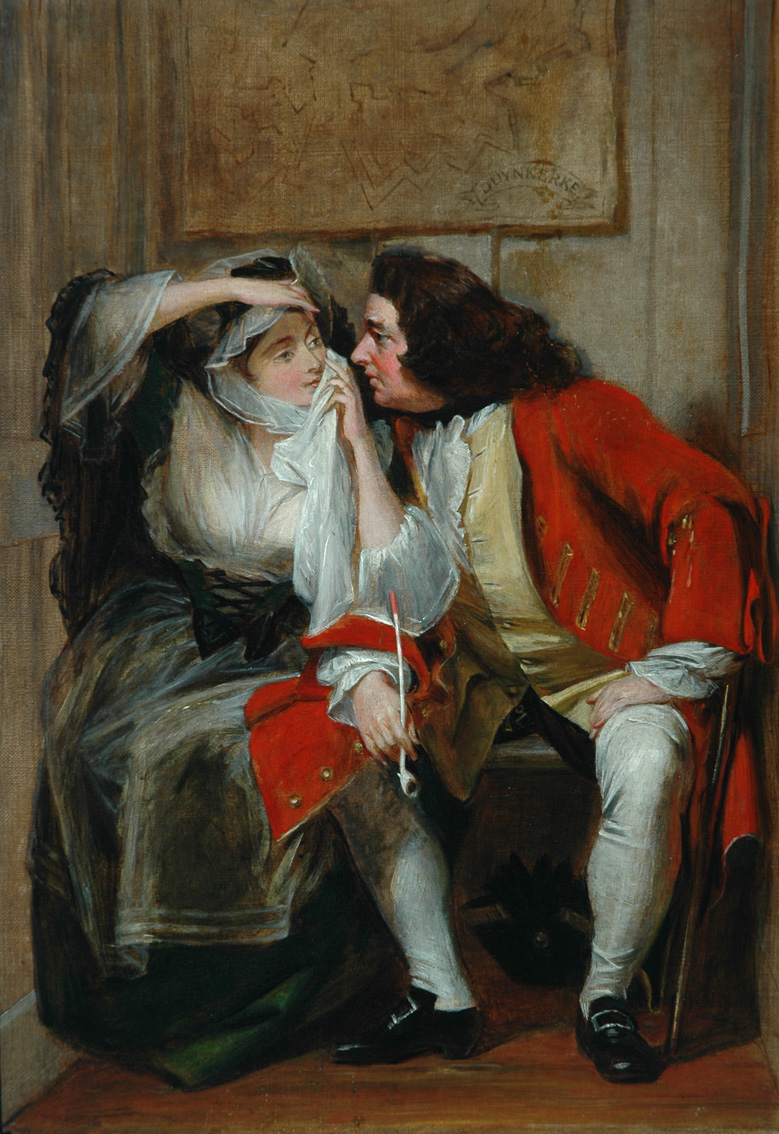
My Uncle Toby and the Widow Wadman by Charles Robert Leslie

Portrait of Lord Melville by David Wilkie

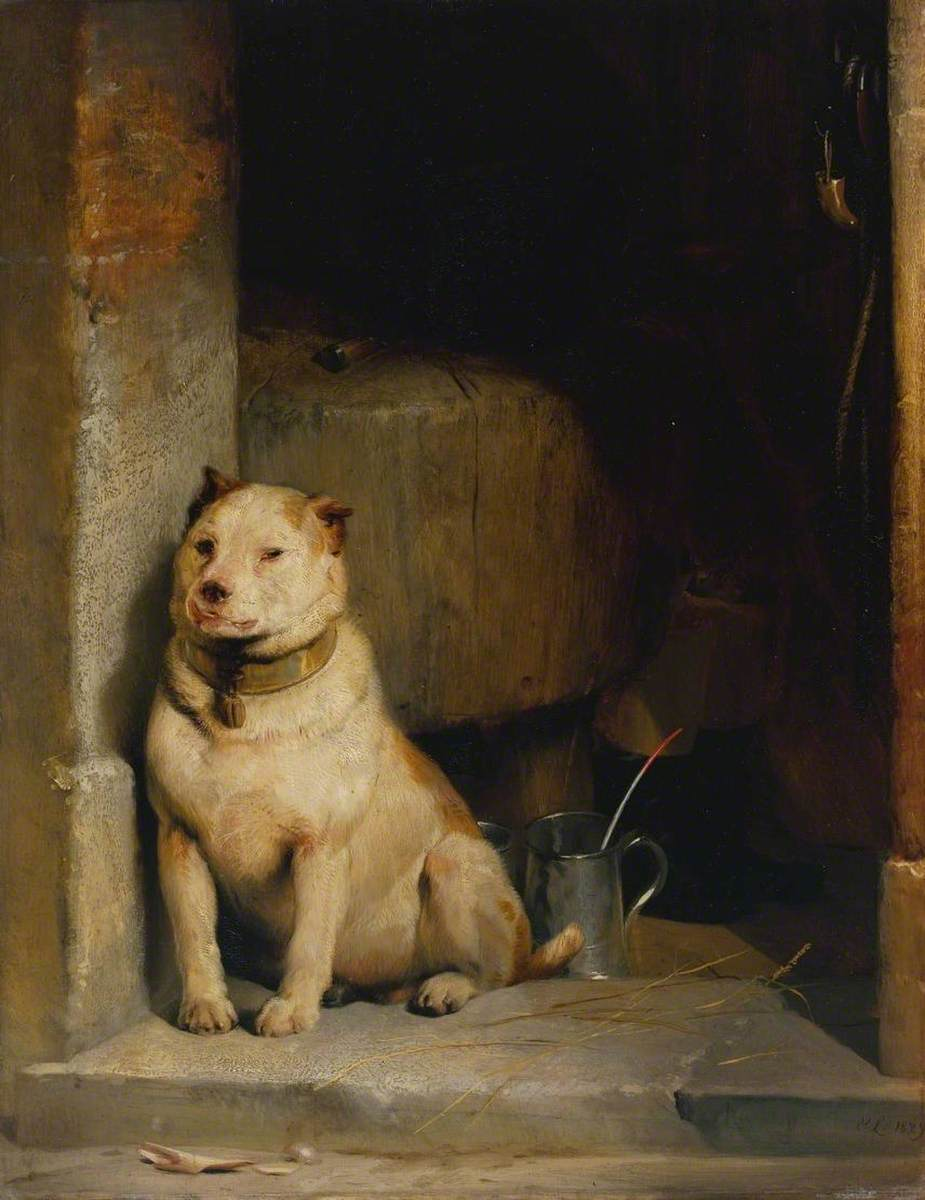
Low Life by Edwin Landseer

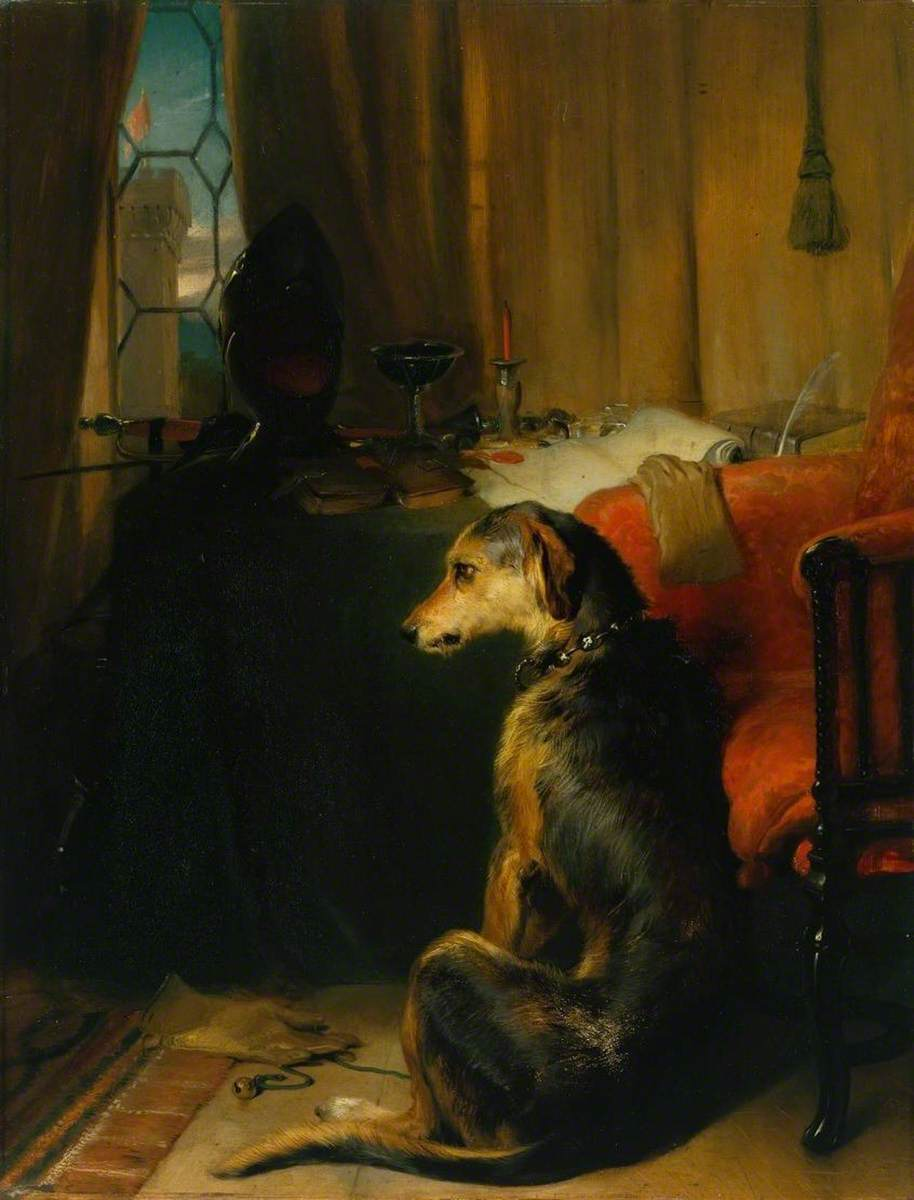
High Life by Edwin Landseer

Comus Listening to the Incantations of Circe by Henry Howard

== See also ==
- Royal Academy Exhibition of 1830, preceding year's exhibition
- Salon of 1831, an art exhibition held at the Louvre in Paris

== Bibliography ==
- Baigell, Matthew. Thomas Cole. Watson-Guptill, 2007.
- Broglio, Ron. Beasts of Burden: Biopolitics, Labor, and Animal Life in British Romanticism. State University Press of New York, 2017.
- Hamilton, James. Constable: A Portrait. Hachette UK, 2022.
- Hamilton, James. Turner - A Life. Sceptre, 1998.
- Herrmann, Luke. Nineteenth Century British Painting. Charles de la Mare, 2000.
- Tromans, Nicholas. David Wilkie: The People's Painter. Edinburgh University Press, 2007.
