= Van Tromp's Barge Entering the Texel =

Painting by J. M. W. Turner

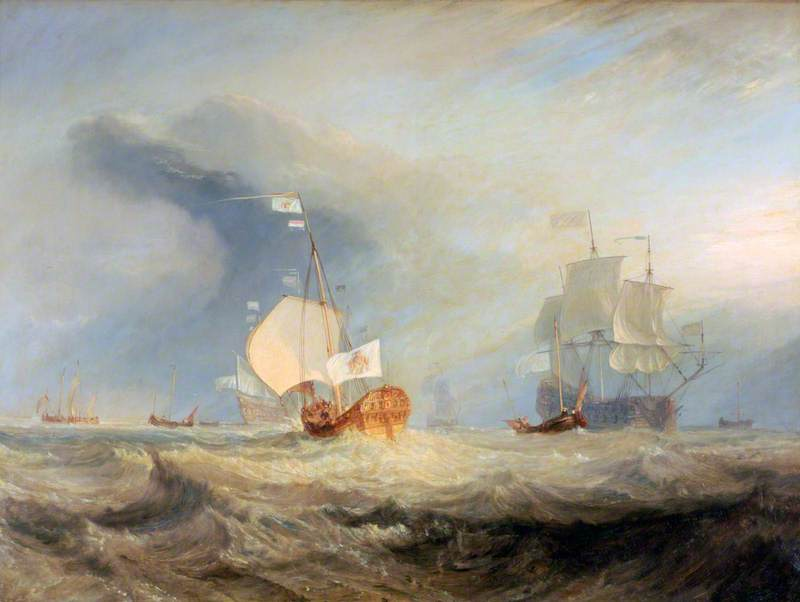
- Artist: J. M. W. Turner
- Year: 1831
- Type: Oil on canvas, seascape painting
- Dimensions: 90.2 cm × 121.9 cm (35.5 in × 48.0 in)
- Location: Sir John Soane's Museum, London

Van Tromp's Barge Entering the Texel, 1645 is an 1831 oil painting by the British artist J.M.W. Turner. It depicts a historical seascape from the mid-seventeenth century. The Dutch Admiral Maarten Tromp's barge approaches Texel in the North of Holland.

It was part of a series of seven Dutch-themed pictures produced by the artist between 1831 and 1833. These have sometimes been read as Turner expressing sympathy for the Kingdom of the Netherlands in the wake of the Belgian Revolution and subsequent French Intervention in Belgium.

The painting was displayed at the Royal Academy Exhibition of 1831 at Somerset House where it was purchased by the architect and art collector Sir John Soane for his London townhouse. Turner had previously produced a commissioned cityscape Forum Romanum for Soane in 1826 but its large size had proved impractical for Soane's already cluttered house and remained in Turner's own collection. The Texel work remains in Sir John Soane's Museum in Lincoln's Inn Fields .

At the Royal Academy Exhibition of 1833 Turner displayed another painting featuring the Admiral Van Tromp Returning after the Battle off the Dogger Bank.

== See also ==
- List of paintings by J. M. W. Turner

== Bibliography ==
- Bailey, Anthony. J.M.W. Turner: Standing in the Sun. Tate Enterprises, 2013.
- Hamilton, James. Turner: The Late Seascapes. Manchester Art Gallery, 2003.
- Solkin, David. Turner and the Masters. Tate Britain, 2009.
