= My Uncle Toby and the Widow Wadman =

Painting by Charles Robert Leslie

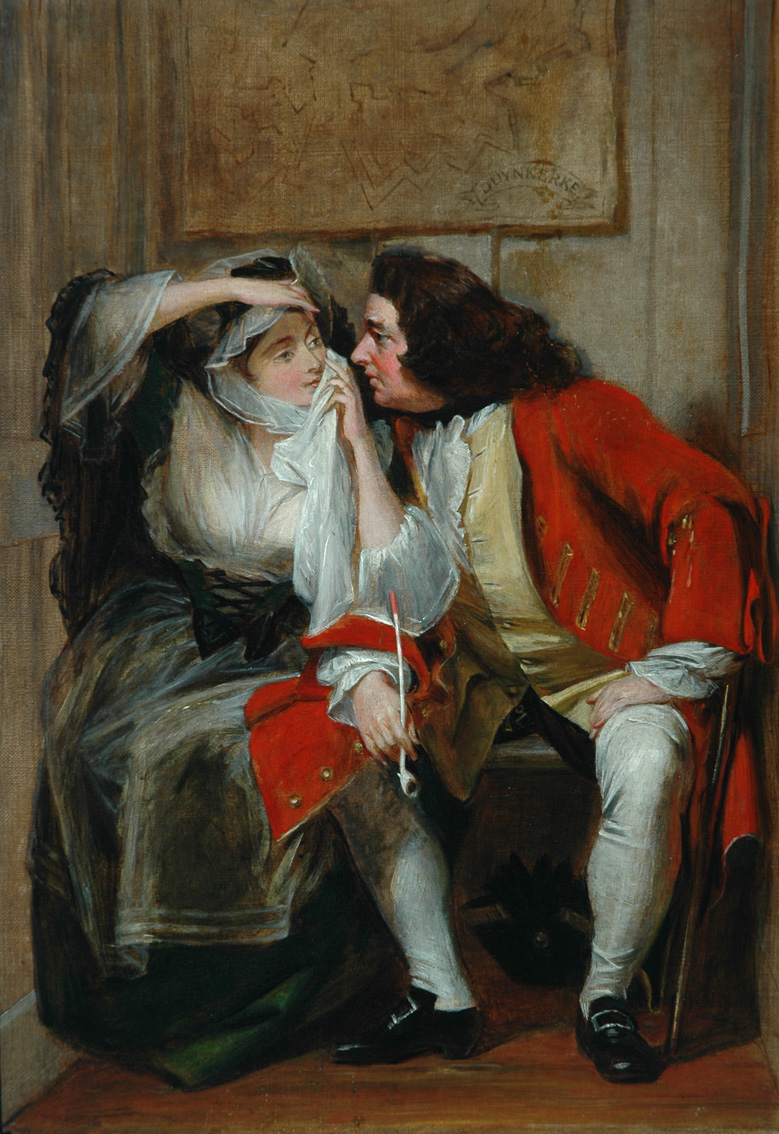
- Artist: Charles Robert Leslie
- Year: 1831
- Type: Oil on canvas, genre painting
- Dimensions: 82.5 cm × 57.1 cm (32.5 in × 22.5 in)
- Location: Victoria and Albert Museum, London

My Uncle Toby and the Widow Wadman is an oil-on-canvas genre painting by the Anglo-American artist Charles Robert Leslie, from 1831. It is inspired by a scene from the Georgian era novel The Life and Opinions of Tristram Shandy, Gentleman by Laurence Sterne. Captain Shandy looking in the eye of the Widow Wadman, who tries to stir his affections by pretending she has something in her eye.

The work was displayed at the Royal Academy Exhibition of 1831 at Somerset House. Acquired by the art collector John Sheepshanks. In 1857 he donated it to the collection of the Victoria and Albert Museum in South Kensington as part of the Sheepshanks Gift. One of Leslie's most celebrated works, he painted it a number of times. A smaller version by Leslie is now in the possession of Shandy Hall in North Yorkshire. It is believed the actor John Bannister, a friend of Leslie's, was the inspiration for Uncle Toby.

== See also ==
- Uncle Toby and the Widow Wadman, an 1865 painting by William Powell Frith

== Bibliography ==
- Newbould, Mary-Celine. Adaptations of Laurence Sterne's Fiction: Sterneana, 1760–1840. Routledge, 2016.
- Roe, Sonia. Oil Paintings in Public Ownership in the Victoria and Albert Museum. Public Catalogue Foundation, 2008.
