= Rebecca at the Well (painting) =

Painting by Francesco Hayez

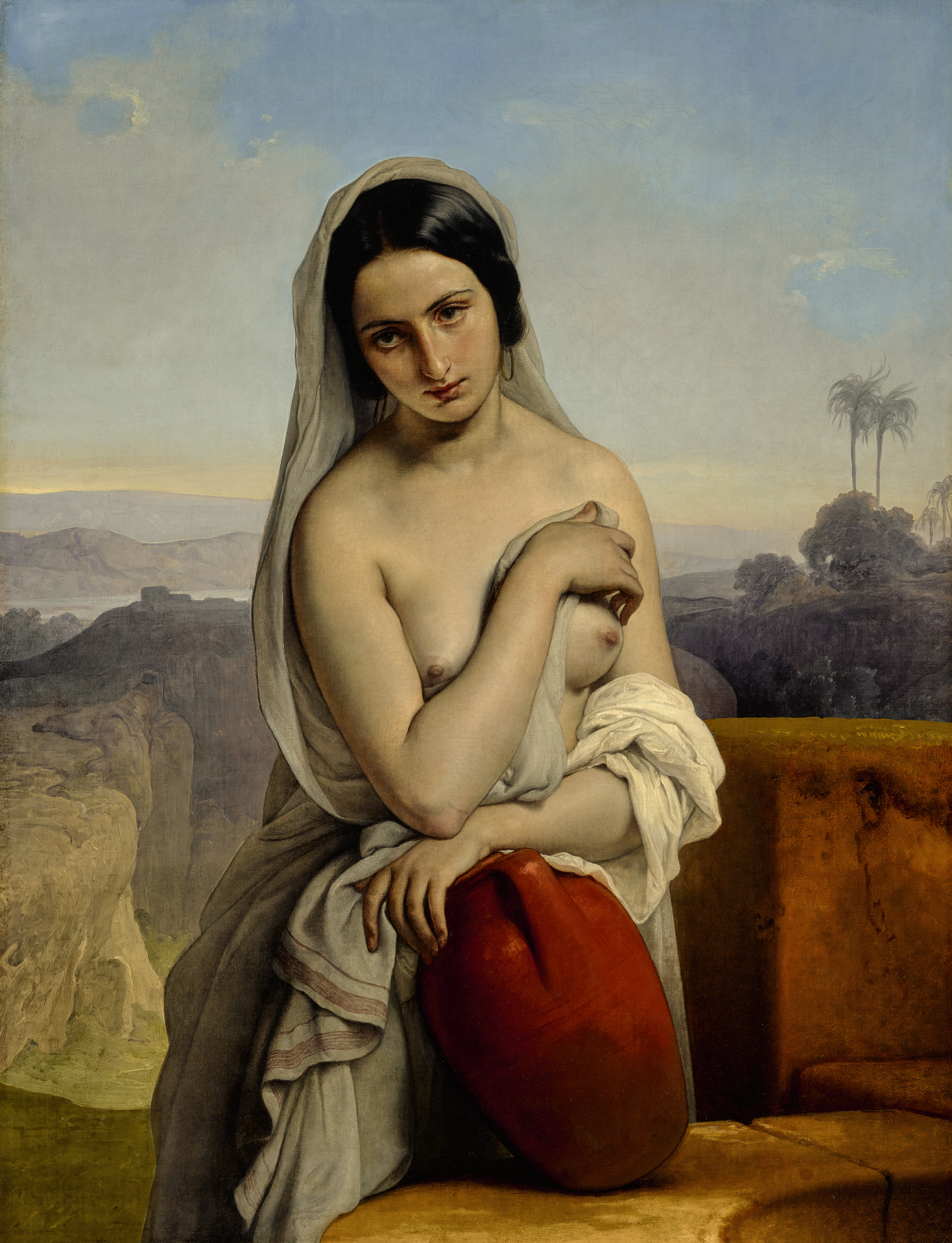
- Artist: Francesco Hayez
- Year: 1831
- Type: Oil on canvas, religious art
- Dimensions: 112 cm × 85 cm (44 in × 33 in)
- Location: Private collection

Rebecca at the Well (Italian: Rebecca al pozzo) is an 1831 history painting by the Italian artist Francesco Hayez. It features the Old Testament biblical figure Rebecca at the well where she will encounter her future husband Isaac.

The painting was commissioned by the Roman nobleman and supporter of Italian unification Gaetano Taccioli, who was to commission further works by Hayez. The artist returned to the theme in 1848 and produced a second version with slight variations which is now in the Brera Academy in his native Milan

== Bibliography ==
- Castellaneta, Carlo & Coradeschi, Sergio. L'opera completa di Hayez. Rizzoli, 1971.
- Mazzocca, Fernando. Hayez privato: arte e passioni nella Milano romantica. U. Allemandi, 1997
