= Rouen Cathedral (Roberts) =

Painting by David Roberts

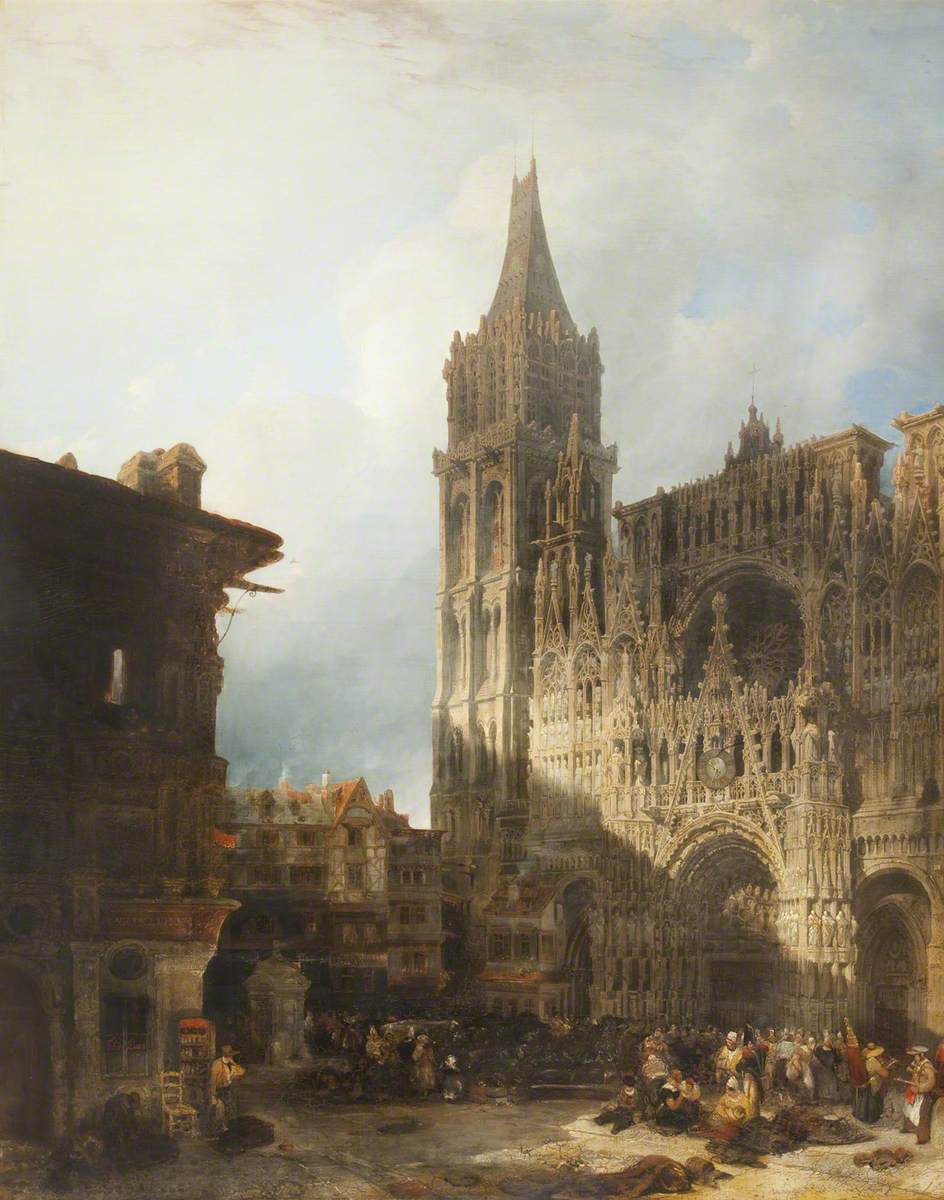
- Artist: David Roberts
- Year: 1831
- Type: Oil on canvas, landscape painting
- Dimensions: 183.5 cm × 137 cm (72.2 in × 54 in)
- Location: Grundy Art Gallery, Blackpool

Rouen Cathedral, also known as Grand Entrance to Rouen Cathedral, is an 1831 oil painting by the British artist David Roberts. It features a view of Rouen Cathedral in the capital of Normandy.

Roberts visited the city in 1824 and the trip provided the inspiration for a number of works at a time when he was transitioning from a theatre set designer to a prominent artist. His view shows the cathedral from the west front, similar to the series of pictures painted by the impressionist Claude Monet later in the century.

The picture was exhibited at the Society of British Artists, of which Roberts was president, the same year. It was reviewed sympathetically in the Literary Gazette. It was the. Shown at the Royal Scottish Academy in 1834 in his native Edinburgh. It is now in the collection of the Grundy Art Gallery in Blackpool which acquired it in 1949.

== Bibliography ==
- Codell, Julie F. Victorian Artists' Autograph Replicas: Auras, Aesthetics, Patronage and the Art Market. Taylor & Francis, 2020.q
- Guiterman Helen & Llewellyn, Briony. David Roberts. Phaidon Press, 1986.
- Sim, Katherine. David Roberts R.A., 1796–1864: A Biography. Quartet Books, 1984.
