= Portrait of Edward Bulwer-Lytton =

Painting by Henry William Pickersgill

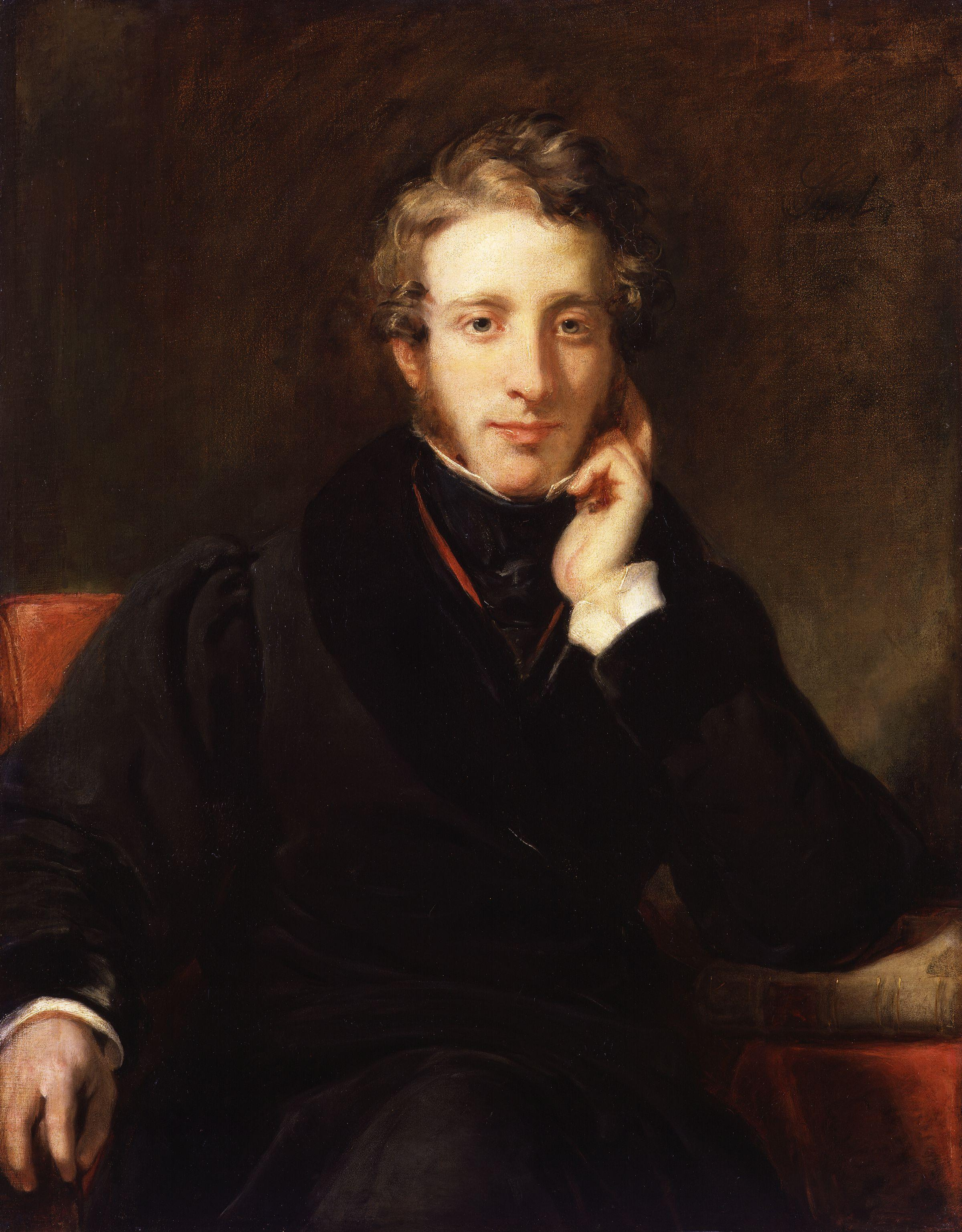
- Artist: Henry William Pickersgill
- Year: 1831
- Type: Oil on canvas, portrait painting
- Dimensions: 91.4 cm × 71.5 cm (36.0 in × 28.1 in)
- Location: National Portrait Gallery, London

Portrait of Edward Bulwer-Lytton is an oil on canvas portrait painting by the British artist Henry William Pickersgill, from 1831.

It depicts the British author Edward Bulwer-Lytton. The portrait is conventional. He is depicted seated, looking directly at the viewer, while his left elbow lies in a book. Bulwer-Lytton had made his name during the late Regency era with his novel Pelham. He went on to be a popular writer of historical novels, regarded as a prominent rival of Charles Dickens, and a politician.

The painting was displayed at the Royal Academy Exhibition of 1831 at Somerset House. It is today in the collection of the National Portrait Gallery in London, having been acquired in 1900.

== Bibliography ==
- Christensen, Allan Conrad (ed.) The Subverting Vision of Bulwer Lytton: Bicentenary Reflections. University of Delaware Press, 2004.
- Kastan, David Scott (ed.) The Oxford Encyclopedia of British Literature. Oxford University Press, 2006.
- Ormond, Richard. Early Victorian Portraits, National Portrait Gallery, 1974.
