= Portrait of Alphonse de Lamartine =

Painting by François Gérard

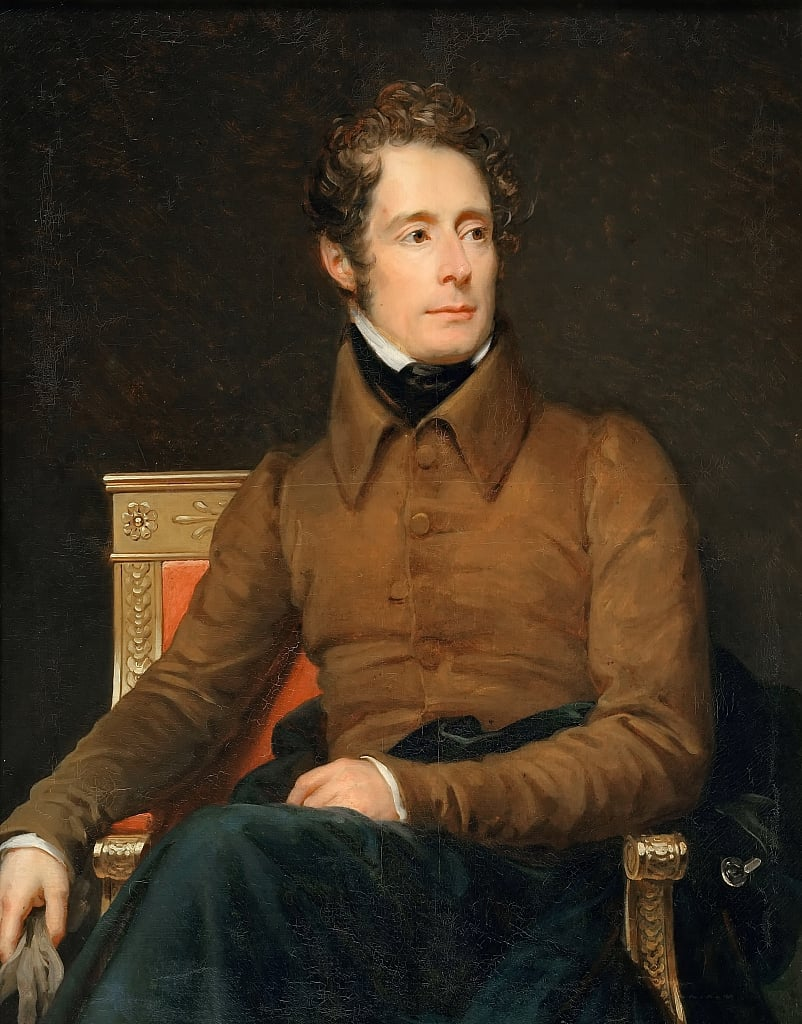
- Artist: François Gérard
- Year: 1831
- Type: Oil on canvas, portrait painting
- Dimensions: 118 cm × 91 cm (46 in × 36 in)
- Location: Palace of Versailles, Versailles

Portrait of Alphonse de Lamartine is an 1831 portrait painting by the French artist François Gérard. It depicts the French writer and politician Alphonse de Lamartine. A key figure of Romanticism, he was a noted opposition figure during the July Monarchy. He later won particular attention during the French Revolution of 1848 and unsuccessfully stood as a candidate in the 1848 French presidential election, which was won by the future Napoleon III.

Gérard was President of the Royal Academy. The painting is now in the collection of the Palace of Versailles, having been acquired in 1883. A second, reduced replica of the painting is in the collection of the Musée Carnavalet in Paris. A print was made based on the painting by the British engraver James Hopwood, with de Lamartine looking in the opposite direction.

== Bibliography ==
- Bordes, Phillipe. Jacques-Louis David: Empire to Exile. Yale University Press, 2007.
- Murray, Christopher John. Encyclopedia of the Romantic Era, 1760-1850, Volume 2. Taylor & Francis, 2004.
