= Window in Venice During a Festa =

Painting by William Etty

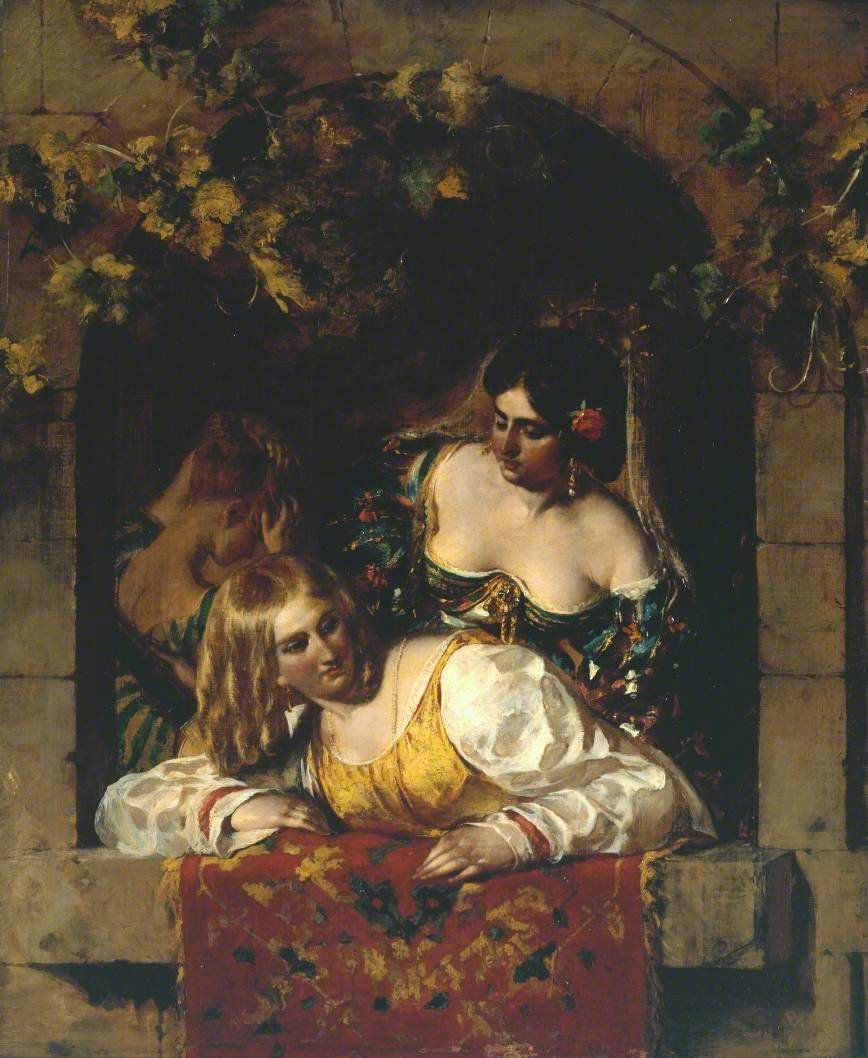
- Artist: William Etty
- Year: 1831
- Type: Oil on canvas, genre painting
- Dimensions: 61 cm × 50.2 cm (24 in × 19.8 in)
- Location: Tate Britain, London

Window in Venice During a Festa is an 1831 oil painting by the British artist William Etty. A genre painting, it depicts three women in costumes for the Venice Carnival season, seen at a balcony window.

It was displayed at the Royal Academy Exhibition of 1831 at Somerset House in London. The art collector Robert Vernon purchased it from the exhibition. In 1847 he donated it to the National Gallery as part of the Vernon Gift. Today it is in the collection of the Tate Britain in Pimlico.

== Bibliography ==
- Herrmann, Luke. Nineteenth Century British Painting. Charles de la Mare, 2000
- Robinson, Leonard. William Etty: The Life and Art. McFarland, 2007.
