= Caligula's Palace and Bridge =

Painting by J. M. W. Turner

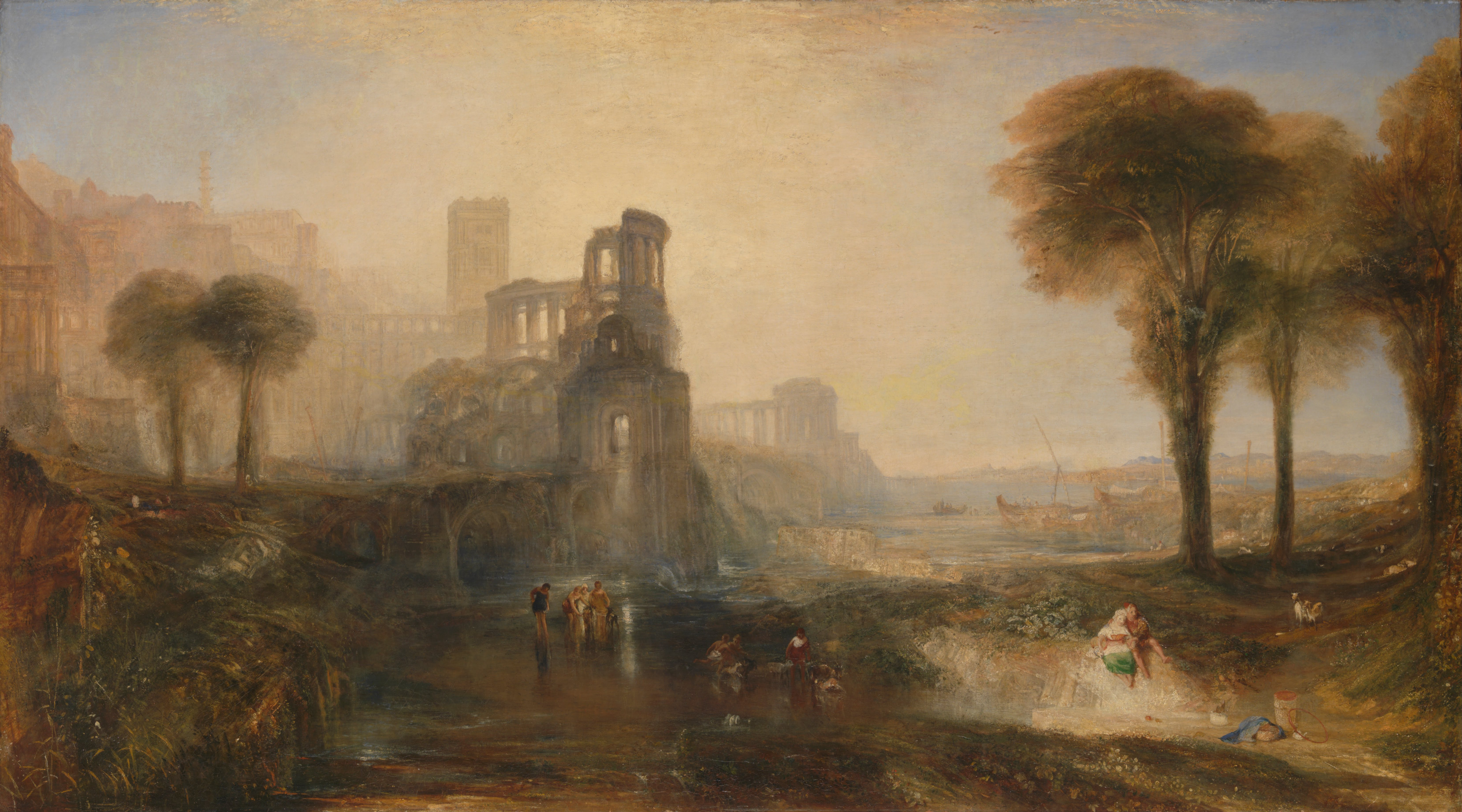
- Artist: J. M. W. Turner
- Year: 1831
- Medium: Oil on canvas
- Dimensions: 137.2 cm × 246.4 cm (54.0 in × 97.0 in)
- Location: Tate Britain, London
- Accession: N00512
- Website: www.tate.org.uk/art/artworks/turner-caligulas-palace-and-bridge-n00512

Caligula's Palace and Bridge is an 1831 landscape painting by the British artist J.M.W. Turner. It is an imagined scene of the giant palace and bridge from Baiae to Puteoli across the Bay of Naples, built under the direction of the deranged Roman Emperor Caligula.

At the Royal Academy Exhibition of 1831 at Somerset House, this and another work by Turner Vision of Medea were hung either side of John Constable's Salisbury Cathedral from the Meadows providing a striking contrast which was picked up on by reviewers. This reportedly led to a row between the two men in front of their fellow artists, as Constable was on the hanging committee that chose were paintings would be placed.

Today the painting is in the collection of the Tate Britain in Pimlico, having been part of the Turner Bequest of 1856 Turner later engaged Edward Goodall to produce an engraving based on the work.

== See also ==
- List of paintings by J. M. W. Turner

== Bibliography ==
- Bailey, Anthony. J.M.W. Turner: Standing in the Sun. Tate Enterprises, 2013.
- Costello, Leo. J.M.W. Turner and the Subject of History. Routledge, 2017.
- Hamilton, James. Constable: A Portrait. Hachette UK, 2022.
- Hamilton, James. Turner - A Life. Sceptre, 1998.
- Reynolds, Graham. Turner. Thames & Hudson, 2022.
