= Yarmouth Jetty =

Painting by John Constable

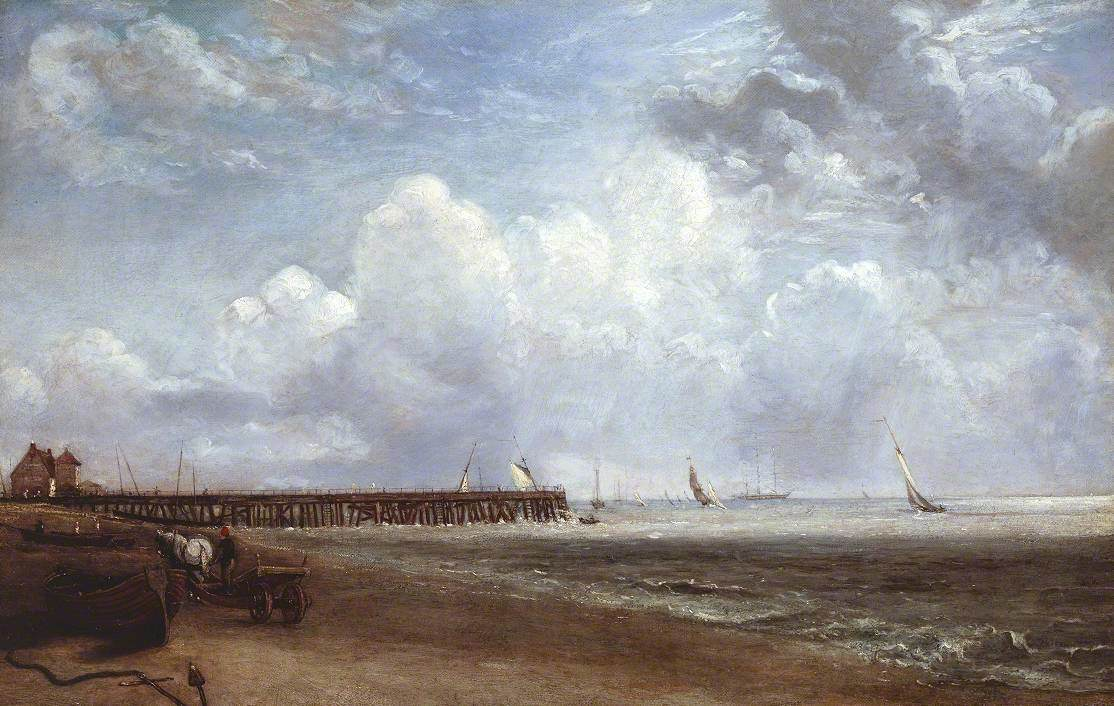
- Version in Tate Britain
- Artist: John Constable
- Year: 1822
- Type: Oil on canvas, landscape painting
- Dimensions: 31.7 cm × 50.8 cm (12.5 in × 20.0 in)
- Location: National Gallery of Art, Washington D.C.

Yarmouth Jetty is an 1822 landscape painting by the British artist John Constable. It depicts a view of the jetty in Great Yarmouth in Norfolk. Constable was from neighbouring Suffolk, although there is only one recorded trip he made to Norfolk during his career. A version of the painting was one of three submitted by Constable to the Salon of 1824 in Paris where his work drew great praise and he was awarded a gold medal.

At least three versions of the painting are in existence. The work that was exhibited at the British Institution in 1823 is now in the National Gallery of Art. Another version dating from around 1824 and exhibited at the 1824 Salon is now in the collection of Tate Britain in London having been part of the Salting Bequest of 1910. The jetty was also painted by the Norfolk landscape artist John Crome.

== Bibliography ==
- Bailey, Anthony. John Constable: A Kingdom of his Own. Random House, 2012.
- Charles, Victoria. Constable. Parkstone International, 2015.
- Gray, Anne & Gage, John. Constable: Impressions of Land, Sea and Sky. National Gallery of Australia, 2006.
- Hamilton, James. Constable: A Portrait. Hachette UK, 2022.
- Reynolds, Graham. Constable's England. Metropolitan Museum of Art, 1983.
- Thornes, John E. John Constable's Skies: A Fusion of Art and Science. A&C Black, 1999.
