= Salisbury Cathedral from the Meadows =

Painting by John Constable

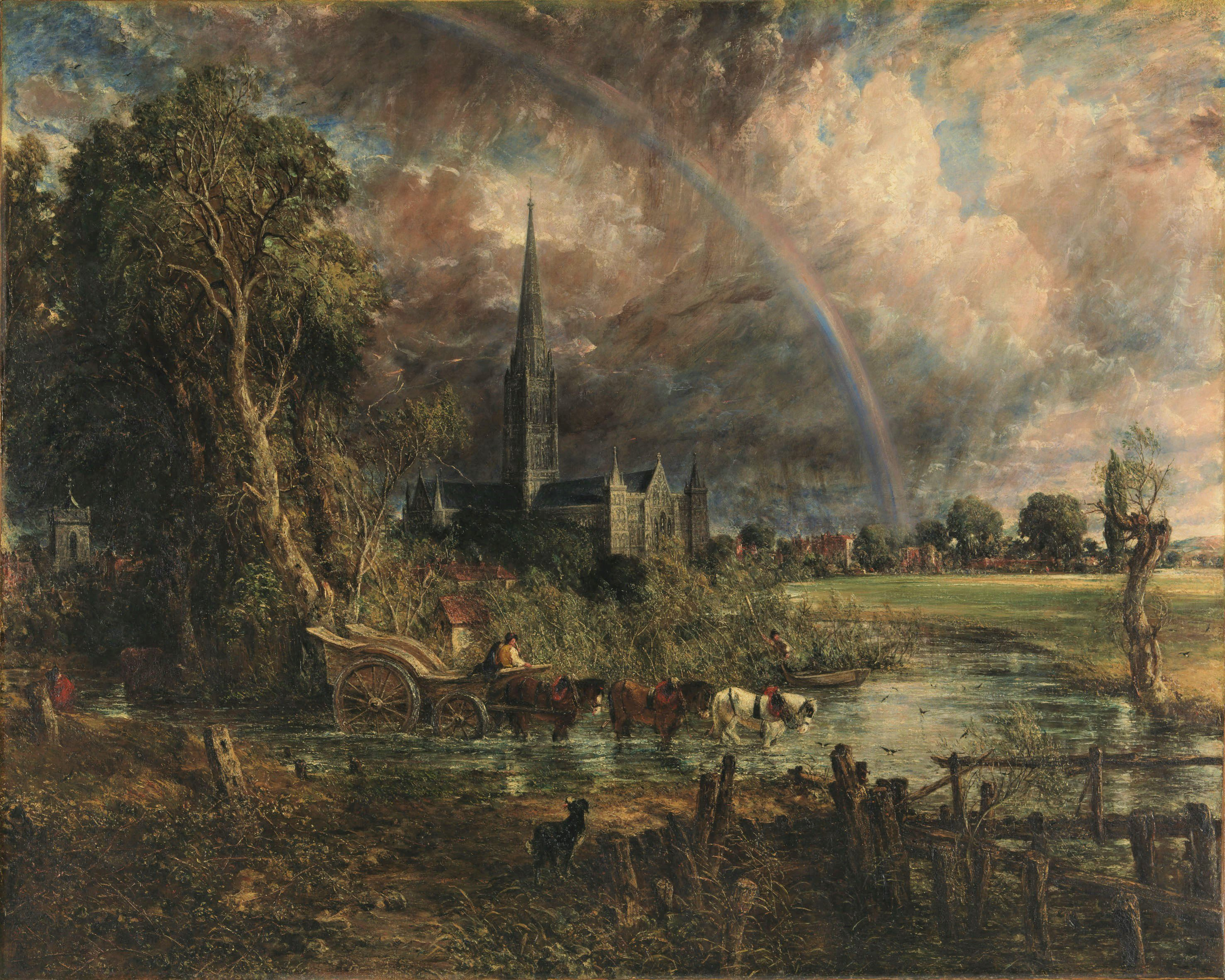
- Artist: John Constable
- Year: 1831
- Medium: Oil on canvas
- Dimensions: 1537 mm × 1920 mm (60.5 in × 76 in)
- Location: Tate Britain, London

Salisbury Cathedral from the Meadows was painted by John Constable in 1831, three years after the death of his wife, Maria. It is currently on display in London, at Tate Britain, in the Clore gallery. The painting displays Salisbury Cathedral across the River Nadder. Three horses pull a cart across the river, while cattle and a sheepdog are also visible.

Constable later added nine lines from The Seasons by the eighteenth-century poet James Thomson that reveal the painting's meaning: that the rainbow is a symbol of hope after a storm that follows on the death of the young Amelia in the arms of her lover Celadon. Constable exhibited this painting at the Royal Academy Exhibition of 1831, but continued working on it during 1833 and 1834. The art historians Leslie Parris and Ian Fleming-Williams have described the painting as the climax of his artistic career.

== Symbolic metaphor ==
This painting was a personal statement of his turbulent emotions and his changing states of mind. The sky reflects this turbulence and shows his emotional state of being.

Possible political meanings have been attributed to it, one of which being the clash of industrialization and nature represented through the clash of elements.

Symbolism in this painting includes:

- Grave marker: symbol of death
- Ash tree: symbol of life
- Church: symbol of faith and resurrection
- Rainbow: symbol of renewed optimism
- Sky: On the sky, Constable wrote: "The sky is the source of light in Nature, and it governs everything."

Constable considered this work the painting that best embodied ‘the full compass’ of his art.

== Stay in the UK ==
In May 2013 the painting was bought by Tate for £23.1m.

The acquisition was part of Aspire, a partnership between Tate and four other national and regional galleries – National Museum Wales, the National Galleries of Scotland, Colchester and Ipswich Museums Service and Salisbury and South Wiltshire Museum – and was acquired with major grants and donations from the Heritage Lottery Fund, the Art Fund (including a contribution from the Wolfson Foundation), The Manton Foundation, and Tate Members. The partnership enabled the work to go on "almost constant" view, and ensured that it would stay in the UK.

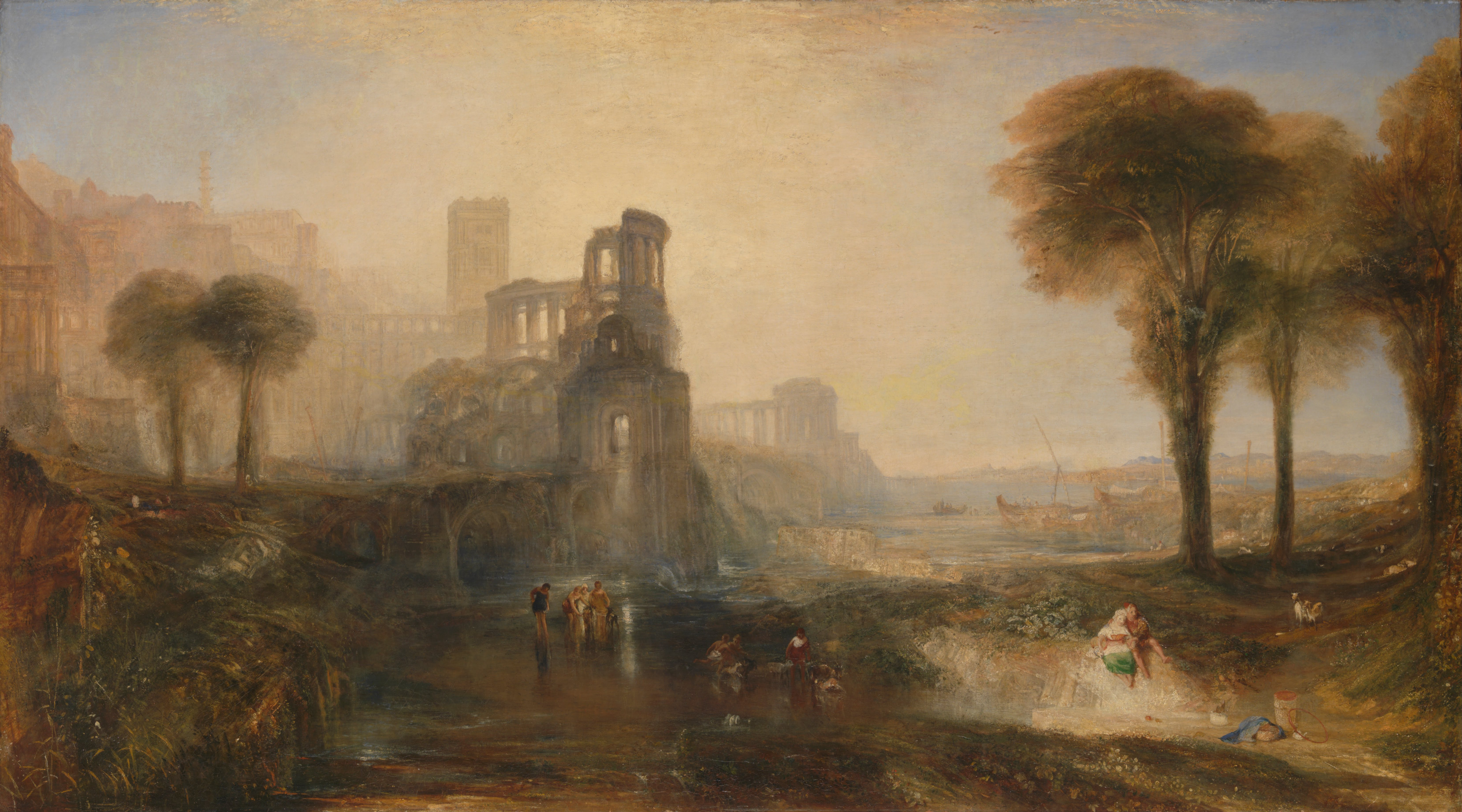
Caligula's Palace and Bridge, 1831, Tate Britain

In 2018, after a five-year tour of Britain, the painting returned to Tate Britain for permanent display. It now hangs next to JMW Turner's Caligula's Palace and Bridge (1831). The two paintings were at the centre of a falling-out between the artists at the 1831 Royal Exhibition. Constable, that year's ‘hangman', switched the arrangement of the paintings at the last minute. Turner, unaware of the change, was infuriated by his painting's new position and "slew Constable without remorse" at a dinner they both attended, later that evening.

== See also ==
- List of paintings by John Constable
- Salisbury Cathedral from the Bishop's Grounds

== Bibliography ==
- Charles, Victoria (2015), Constable, New York: Parkstone International, ISBN 978-1-78042-954-0
