= Alexander I Statue in Taganrog =

Monument in Taganrog, Rostov, Russia

Coordinates: 47°12′42″N 38°55′37″E

Monument to Alexander I
- Памятник Александру I
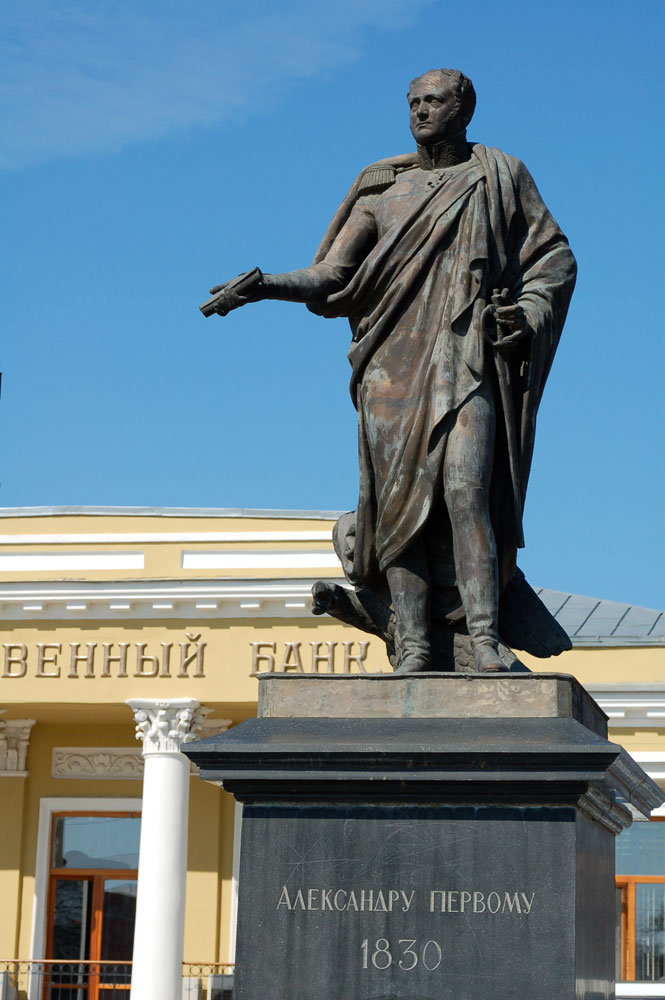
- Monument to Alexander I. Photo taken in 2007.
- Interactive map of Monument to Alexander I
- Location: Bank square, Taganrog
- Designer: Ivan Martos
- Opening date: October 23 (11), 1831 new monument open on September 12, 1998
- Dedicated to: Alexander I of Russia

The monument to Alexander I of Russia was erected on the initiative of the people of Taganrog in memory of the emperor's stay and death in the city.

The place to set the monument was chosen by the widow of Alexander I Elizabeth Alexeievna (Louise of Baden) – opposite the Greek monastery. Most of the money to subsidize the construction of the monument was donated by the members of the Imperial house of Romanovs, the rest of the sum was raised by the people of Taganrog.

The statue was sculpted by the eminent sculptor, rector of the St. Petersburg Academy of Arts Ivan Martos. The architectural part of the monument was designed by the famous architect Avraam Melnikov.

The bronze figure of the emperor at full height was draped with a simple gown, and a general's uniform was visible under it. The tsar held the sword hilt with his left hand, and carried a scroll which was supposed to be the code of laws. One foot of Alexander I trampled a coiling snake symbolizing the victory over Napoleon. The face of the sculpture was a copy of the emperor's portrait, and the winged angels at his feet pointed out his angelic character. The granite pedestal consisted of three parts, 5 steps led to it. The entire monument weighed about 1600 kg.

On October 23 (11), 1831, celebrations took place on the occasion of unveiling the monument. They included divine services, consecration of the monument, firing a salute, ringing bells at all the churches and evening illumination.

In 1837 cast-iron lumps with heavy chains were added to palisade the monument. In 1888 a square was planted around and fenced with iron forged railings.

In 1920 the monument was destroyed (in 1932 the statue was remelted).

In 1998 in the course of celebrations of the tercentenary of Taganrog the monument was reconstructed according to original plans at the same place. The reconstruction was financed by the Rossiyskiy Kredit Bank.

The original model of the monument is kept in the collection of Russian Museum in Saint Petersburg.

== Old and Modern Views ==
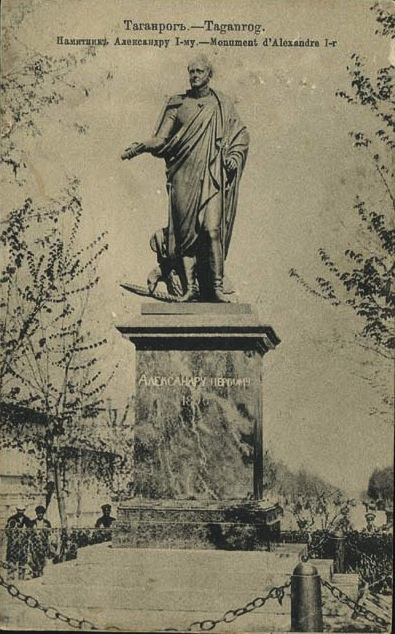
Monument on a postcard of 1907.

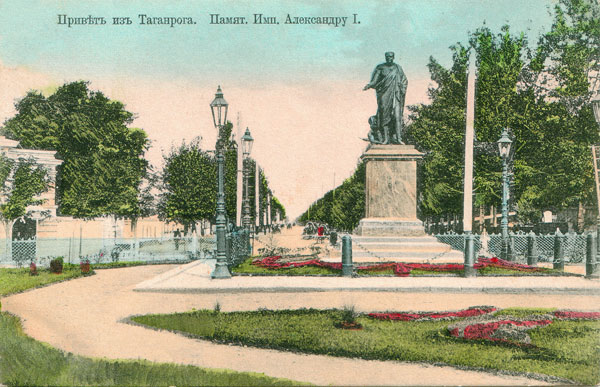
Monument on an old postcard. Photo taken in late 19th century.
