= Binyon =

Binyon is a surname. Notable people with the surname include:

- Brightwen Binyon (1846–1905), British architect
- Claude Binyon (1905–1978), American screenwriter and director
- Edward Binyon (1827–1876), British landscape painter
- Helen Binyon (1904–1979), British artist and author, daughter of Laurence Binyon
- Laurence Binyon (1869–1943), English poet, dramatist, and art scholar
- Michael Binyon, English journalist
- Nicolete Binyon, married name Nicolete Gray (1911–1997), British scholar, daughter of Laurence Binyon
- T. J. Binyon (1936–2004), English scholar and crime writer

== See also ==
- Binion
