= Basil Gray =

British art historian, Islamicist and author

Basil Gray CB CBE FBA
- Born: 1904; Kensington, London, England
- Died: 10 June 1989 (aged 84–85); Oxford, England
- Occupation: Head of British Museum’s Oriental department
- Known for: Art historian

Basil Gray, CB, CBE, FBA (1904–1989), was an English art historian, Islamicist, author, and the head of the British Museum's Oriental department.

== Early life ==
Basil Gray was born in 1904 at Kensington, the son to Charles Gray and Florence Elworthy Cowell. His father was a Royal Army Medical Corps surgeon. He attended Bradfield College and in the 1920s studied at New College, Oxford.

== Career ==
Following graduation in 1927 Gray travelled to the Schönbrunn Palace and Osterreichisches Museum in Vienna to view Mughal painting. While in Vienna he studied under Josef Strzygowski, and developed a friendship with Otto Demus, art historian and Byzantinist. Following this he worked with art historian David Talbot Rice at the British Academy excavations of the palace of the Byzantine emperors in Constantinople.

On his return to England he joined in 1930 the Sub-Department of Oriental Prints and Drawings at the British Museum, under Laurence Binyon, in 1940 becoming the department's deputy keeper, and in 1946, its keeper. Under his tenure he managed employment intake, collections and acquisitions, and curated special exhibitions using the department's own collections, and those from public and private sources.

The archeologist Roman Ghirshman invited Gray to Iran in 1951, to study Ville Royale excavations at Susa. Further visits to Iran included Iranian Institute's and British Council lectures at Isfahan, Tabriz, and Mashhad, and for Shiraz he urged, as a member of the Iranian Institute governing body, investigations of the dye trade between the Persian Gulf and China.

He became the temporary Director of the British Museum in 1968, and retired in 1969. During retirement his focus turned to the relationship between Chinese ceramics and Persian painting. He became vice-president of the British Institute of Persian Studies in 1969, chaired the Sixth International Congress of Iranian Art and Archaeology at Oxford in 1972, and became President of the Societas Iranologica Europara in 1983. As an art historian Gray wrote exhibition guides and books on Orientalism and Islamic Art.

A curatorial position in the Department of Asia at the British Museum is named after Gray.

== Personal life ==
In 1933 Basil Gray married the scholar of art and lettering Nicolete Mary Binyon (1911–1997), daughter of Laurence Binyon, poet, art scholar and dramatist. There were five children from the marriage including the art historian Camilla Gray. Basil Gray died on 10 June 1989.

== Publications ==
- Gray, Basil, Japanese Screen Painting, Faber and Faber
- The Arts of India, Basil Gray (editor), Vikas Publishing House Pvt Ltd, ISBN 0706915712
- Gray, Basil, Rajput painting (The Faber gallery of oriental art), Pitman Publishing (1949)
- Gray, Basil, Japanese Woodcuts, Bruno Cassirer
- Gray, Basil, Treasures of Indian miniatures in the Bikaner Palace collection, Cassirer; Faber and Faber (1951)
- Gray, Basil, Early Chinese pottery and porcelain (Faber monographs on pottery and porcelain series), Faber and Faber, 1st ed. edition (1953)
- Gray, Basil; Ashton, Leigh, Chinese Art, Faber and Faber (1953), ISBN 1125237821
- Rajput Painting, Basil Gray (introduction and notes), Faber and Faber (1956)
- Gray, Basil. Persian Painting: Treasures of Asia, Vol. II. Editions d'Art Albert Skira, Geneva (1961)
- Gray, Basil, Persian miniatures from ancient manuscripts (Fontana Unesco art books), Collins; Unesco (1962)
- Barrett, Douglas and Gray, Basil. Painting of India: Treasures of Asia, Vol. V. Editions d'Art Albert Skira, Geneva (1963)
- Gray, Basil, Garner, Harry M, The Ceramic Art of China, The Victoria & Albert Museum (1971),
- The Persian art of the book : catalogue of an exhibition held at the Bodleian Library to mark the sixth International Congress of Iranian Art and Archaeology, Basil Gray (editor), B.W. Robinson (editor), Oxford : Bodleian Library; 1st edition (1972)
- Illustrations to the "World History" of Rashid Al-Din, Basil Gray (editor), Edinburgh University Press (1976), ISBN 0852242719
- Gray, Basil, Persian Painting (Treasures of Asia), Macmillan Publishers (1977), ISBN 0333223748
- Gray, Basil; Barrat D., Indian Painting (Treasures of Asia), Macmillan Publishers (1978), ISBN 0333242033
- Gray, Basil; Akimushkin O. F., The Arts of the Book in Central Asia- 14th-16th Centuries, Shambhala Publications (1979), ISBN 0394507673
- Gray, Basil, Sung Porcelain and Stoneware (The Faber monographs on pottery & porcelain) Faber and Faber, 1st edition (1984), ISBN 0571130488
- Gray, Basil, Persian Painting (Skira), Editions d'Art Albert Skira SA (1995), ISBN 2605003035
- Gray, Basil, La Peinture Indienne – Traduit de l'Anglais, Flammarion (2008), ISBN 2605000605
- Gray, Basil (author); Vincent, J.B. (illustrator), Buddhist Cave Paintings at Tun-huang, Literary Licensing, LLC (2011), ISBN 1258113961

See also

- Rogers, John Michael, “Basil Gray,” Iran 17, 1979, pp. 3–9 (includes a bibliography of Gray's works to 1979)
- Gray, Edmund, "Centenary Bibliography of Basil Gray", in Iran Vol. 42 (2004), pp. 235–245 (continuation of Rogers' bibliography, after 1979)

== Obituaries and memorials ==
- Watson, William, “Basil Gray, CBE,” Transactions of the Oriental Ceramic Society 1988-89, 1990, pp. 9–10.
- Pinder-Wilson, Ralph, “Basil Gray, 1904-89,” Iran 27, 1989, pp. v-vi.
- Pinder-Wilson, Ralph, “Basil Gray, 1904-89,” in Proceedings of the British Academy 105: 1999 Lectures and Memoirs, Oxford, 2000, pp. 439–57.
