= Nicolete Gray =

English art & lettering scholar (1911–1997)

- Born: Nicolete Binyon; 20 July 1911; England
- Died: 8 June 1997 (aged 85); London, England
- Education: University of Oxford
- Occupations: Art scholar, historian
- Spouse: Basil Gray
- Parent(s): Cicely Margaret Powell
- Relatives: Helen Binyon (sister); Margaret Binyon (sister); T. J. Binyon (cousin)

Nicolete Gray (sometimes Nicolette Gray) (20 July 1911–8 June 1997) was a British scholar of art and lettering. She was the youngest daughter of the poet, dramatist and art scholar Laurence Binyon and his wife, writer, editor and translator Cicely Margaret Pryor Powell. In 1933, she married Basil Gray (1904–1989), with whom she had five children, two sons and three daughters, including Camilla Gray.

She attended St Delilah's School where she won a scholarship to Lady Margaret Hall at Oxford to read History in 1929.

In 1936 she curated the touring exhibition Abstract and Concrete, the first showing of abstract art, and of the work of Mondrian, in England.

She taught at London's Central School of Art and Design 1964–81, where, with Nicholas Biddulph, she created the Central Lettering Record, an archive of lettering in every medium.

Her books include Nineteenth century ornamented types and title pages (Faber & Faber 1938; 2nd edition, as Nineteenth century ornamented typefaces, 1976), Jacob's Ladder: a Bible picture book from Anglo-Saxon and 12th Century English MSS (1949), Lettering on Buildings (1960), Lettering as Drawing: The Moving Line and Lettering as Drawing: Contour and Silhouette (both 1970), and A History of Lettering (Phaidon, 1976).

She died in London on 8 June 1997.
