= Camilla Gray =

British art historian (1936–1971)

- Born: 17 May 1936; London, England, United Kingdom
- Died: 17 December 1971 (aged 35); Sochi, Russia, Soviet Union
- Education: Attended the Convent of the Sacred Heart in Hammersmith, London Trained as a ballet dancer and later as a Russian interpreter
- Occupations: Art historian, author, and curator
- Spouse: Oleg Prokofiev (m. 1969)
- Children: Anastasia
- Parent(s): Basil Gray; Nicolete Binyon

Camilla M. Gray, also known as Camilla Gray-Prokofieva, (17 May 1936 – 17 December 1971) was a British art historian whose book, The Great Experiment: Russian Art 1863–1922, broke new ground in promoting this branch of modernism. Gray organised several exhibitions in London on the relevant artists such as Kazimir Malevich, Mikhail Larionov, and Natalia Goncharova. She married Oleg Prokofiev, son of the composer Sergei Prokofiev.

== Early life ==
Camilla Gray was born in Hampstead, London, in 1936, the daughter of Basil Gray, keeper of Oriental art at the British Museum, and the scholar of art and lettering Nicolete Gray. She had two sisters, Cecilia and Sophy and two brothers, Edmund and Marius. The family lived at the museum. She was the granddaughter of the poet Laurence Binyon. She received her basic education at the Convent of the Sacred Heart in Hammersmith, London, and remained a committed Catholic throughout her life. According to Abbott Gleason's father, Basil Gray did not approve of higher education for girls and so she did not attend university, instead, being very determined, she had gone to live in Cambridge for several years and attended the lectures at the university there and got to know the professors. She was already studying Russian modernism but did not visit the country until 1955 when she went as a ballet student. She also trained as a Russian interpreter.

== Russian art ==
Gray first began to research modern Russian art in an organised way in 1957, travelling internationally to gather material from individuals and institutions. She interviewed the surviving Russian artists of the modern period in Paris and then spent most of 1958 researching at the Museum of Modern Art in New York and at Yale University. She supported herself by working at the New York Public Library. Her writing began to be published, starting with an article on Kazimir Malevich that appeared in The Times in 1958 and another on El Lissitzky appearing in Typographica in 1959. She found that nobody she discussed Lissitsky with had heard of him. Also in 1959, she wrote the catalogue for the Kazimir Malevich exhibition held at the Whitechapel Art Gallery in London. In 1960 she visited Russia again for six weeks, researching in archives and interviewing surviving artists in time to capture their memories. In 1961, she wrote the catalogue for the Arts Council-supported retrospective exhibition of Mikhail Larionov and Natalia Goncharova's paintings and designs for the theatre.

Gray won backing for her research from a number of influential figures such as Herbert Read, Kenneth Clark, Isaiah Berlin, and Alfred Barr. Barr was particularly encouraging and helpful; he had visited Russia in the 1920s and met some of the people Gray was writing about and in a letter of 1961 urged her to publish her work despite her misgivings about possible errors in the text, saying that the book would, nonetheless, be a sound foundation for future scholars. The Great Experiment: Russian Art 1863–1922 was published in a large format by Thames & Hudson in 1962 and broke new ground in explaining Russian avant-garde art outside Russia. It was dedicated to Gray's mother "to whom this book owes its inspiration and realization". In the introduction to the first edition, Gray commented on the difficulties she had encountered in compiling the work, needing to combine information from newspaper articles, unpublished memoirs, exhibition catalogues and the often contradictory recollections of living artists. It was criticised by some reviewers for the seemingly arbitrary cut-off of 1922, for a certain amount of generalisation and excessive detail in other parts, and has to some extent been superseded by later more nuanced works that make a greater distinction between the individual Constructivists. However, there was also general praise for the achievement of what was clearly a very difficult task that nobody else had been able to tackle in an area that was previously largely unknown to Western scholars.

Gray's publishers asked her to write a book specifically about Constructivism and she won a Leverhulme Trust award to pay for the research but was unable to proceed as the British Council would not endorse the project because she had no university degree. In 1971, The Great Experiment was retitled The Russian Experiment in Art: 1863–1922 and published in Thames & Hudson's small format 'The World of Art Library' series without the artist's statements from the original. A revised and expanded edition by Marian Burleigh-Motley was published in the same series in 1986.

Gray proposed an exhibition of Soviet revolutionary art in Britain and despite obstacles at home due to misunderstandings and official Soviet antipathy to abstract art, it was realised in 1971 as Art in Revolution: Soviet Art and Design since 1917 which ran at the Hayward Gallery from 26 February to 18 April 1971 with the support of the Arts Council. She wrote the introduction to the catalogue by which time she was describing herself as Camilla Gray-Prokofieva.

== Personal life ==
In November 1969, Gray married Oleg Prokofiev, son of the composer Sergei Prokofiev, whom she had met in Russia in 1960. They had been kept apart by the Soviet authorities over visa difficulties, prompted, according to sources, by Soviet unhappiness with Gray's sympathetic views on Wassily Kandinsky, Malevich, and the other Russian modernists, and official antipathy to abstract art. The couple had a daughter, Anastasia, born in 1970. Gray died of hepatitis in Sochi on 17 December 1971 while pregnant with their second child. A requiem mass was held for her at Westminster Cathedral in January 1972.

== Ancestry ==
Ancestors of Camilla Gray

Charles Gray
Basil Gray
Florence Cowell
Camilla Gray; 1936-1971
Frederick Binyon
Robert Binyon
Mary Dockray
Nicolete Binyon
Cicely Powell

== Selected publications ==
- Kasimir Malevich, 1878–1935: An exhibition of paintings, drawings, and studies organised in association with the Stedelijk Museum, Amsterdam and held at the Whitechapel Art Gallery, London, October–November 1959. Whitechapel Art Gallery, London, 1959.
- "The Russian Contribution to Modern Painting", The Burlington Magazine, May 1960.
- A Retrospective Exhibition of Paintings and Designs for the Theatre – Larionov and Goncharova. Arts Council, London, 1961.
- The Great Experiment: Russian Art 1863–1922. Thames & Hudson, London, 1962.
- "Introduction" in Art in Revolution: Soviet Art and Design since 1917 Hayward Gallery London 26 February to 18 April 1971. Arts Council, London, 1971.
- The Russian Experiment in Art: 1863–1922, 'World of Art' series. Thames & Hudson, London, 1986. (New edition of The Great Experiment, revised and expanded by Marian Burleigh-Motley)
