= Binion =

Binion is a surname. Notable people with the surname include:

- Benny Binion (1904–1989), American businessman and convicted murderer
- Jack Binion (born 1937), American businessman
- Ted Binion (1943–1998), American businessman
- Joe Binion (born 1961), American basketball player
- McArthur Binion (born 1946), American artist

== See also ==
- Binyon
