= Jan Stuart =

American art historian

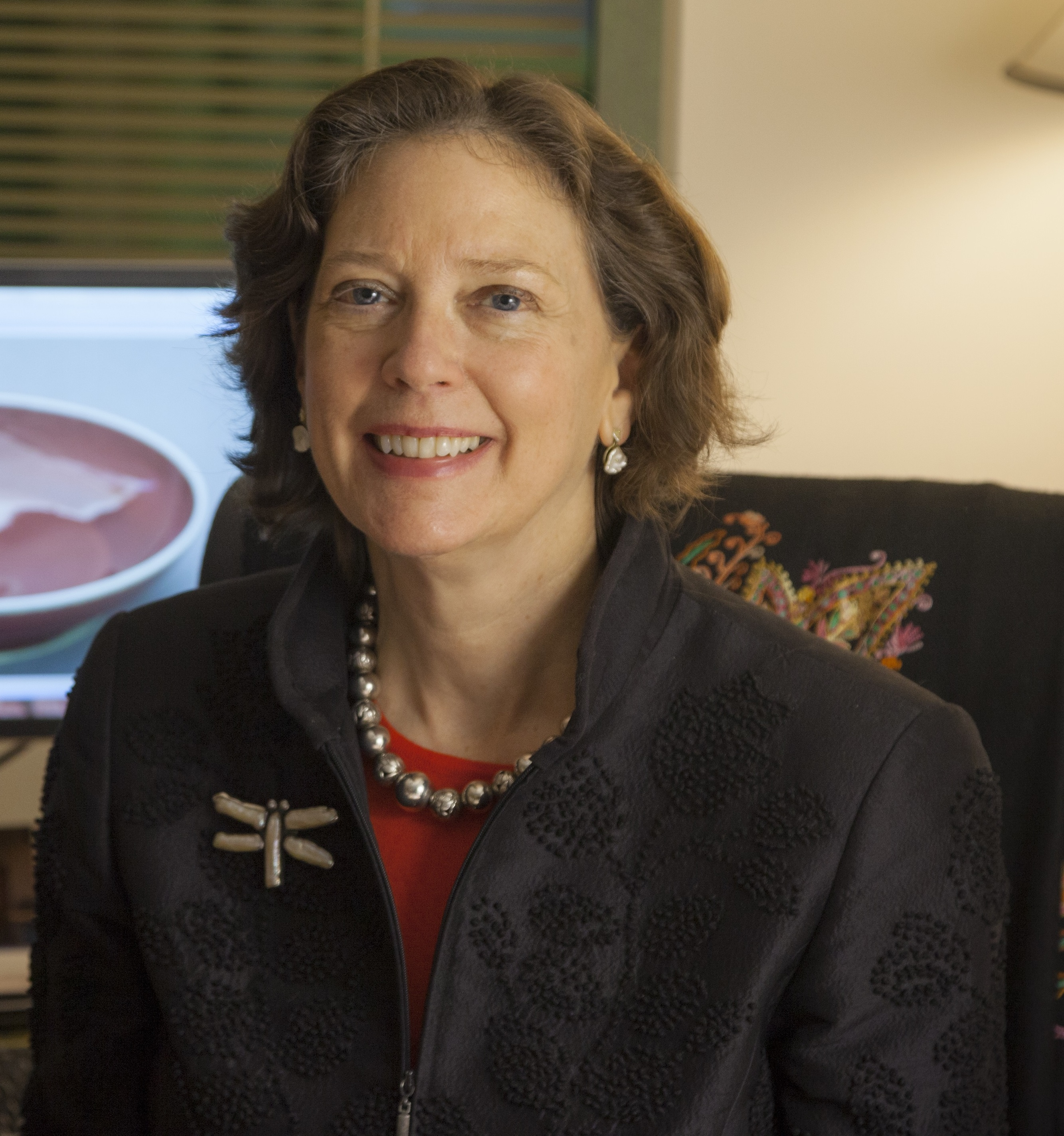
- Born: New York City
- Education: Yale University; Princeton University
- Occupation: art historian
- Employer(s): Freer Gallery of Art and Arthur M. Sackler Gallery
- Known for: expert in Chinese painting

Jan Stuart is an American art historian specialising in Chinese painting, ceramics and decorative arts. She is currently the Melvin R. Seiden Curator of Chinese Art at the Freer Gallery of Art and Arthur M. Sackler Gallery in Washington, D.C.

== Education ==
Born in New York City and raised in Connecticut, Stuart earned her BA and MA in East Asian studies at Yale University, and did a second MA at Princeton University in Chinese art and archeology.

== Career ==
Stuart worked at the Freer and Sackler Galleries for more than 20 years (1988-2006). She then took the position of Keeper of the Department of Asia at the British Museum (2006-2014). During her time at the British Museum, she was responsible for a collection of 125,000 objects, ranging from prehistoric pieces to contemporary art, a team of curators and support staff, and the creation of the Sir Joseph Hotung Centre for Ceramic Studies, which houses the Sir Percival David Collection of Chinese art. She also supervised and contributed to a number of exhibitions, including The First Emperor: China’s Terracotta Army, Xu Bing: Background Story, Shunga: Sex and Pleasure in Japanese Art, and Ming: 50 Years That Changed China. In 2014 she returned to the Freer and Sackler Galleries, where she is currently the Melvin R. Seiden Curator of Chinese Art at the Freer Gallery of Art and Arthur M. Sackler Gallery in Washington, D.C.

== Selected publications ==
- 2011 "Timely Images: Chinese Art and Festival Display", Proceedings of the British Academy Volume 167, 2009 Lectures, 2011.
- 2001 (with Evelyn S. Rawski) Worshipping the Ancestors: Chinese Commemorative Portraits, Washington, DC and Stanford, CA: Freer Gallery of Art and the Arthur M. Sackler Gallery in association with Stanford University Press, ISBN 08047 4262 6
- 1990 "Ming dynasty gardens reconstructed in words and images", The Journal of Garden History, 1990
