= Bang (Korean) =

Korean word meaning "room"

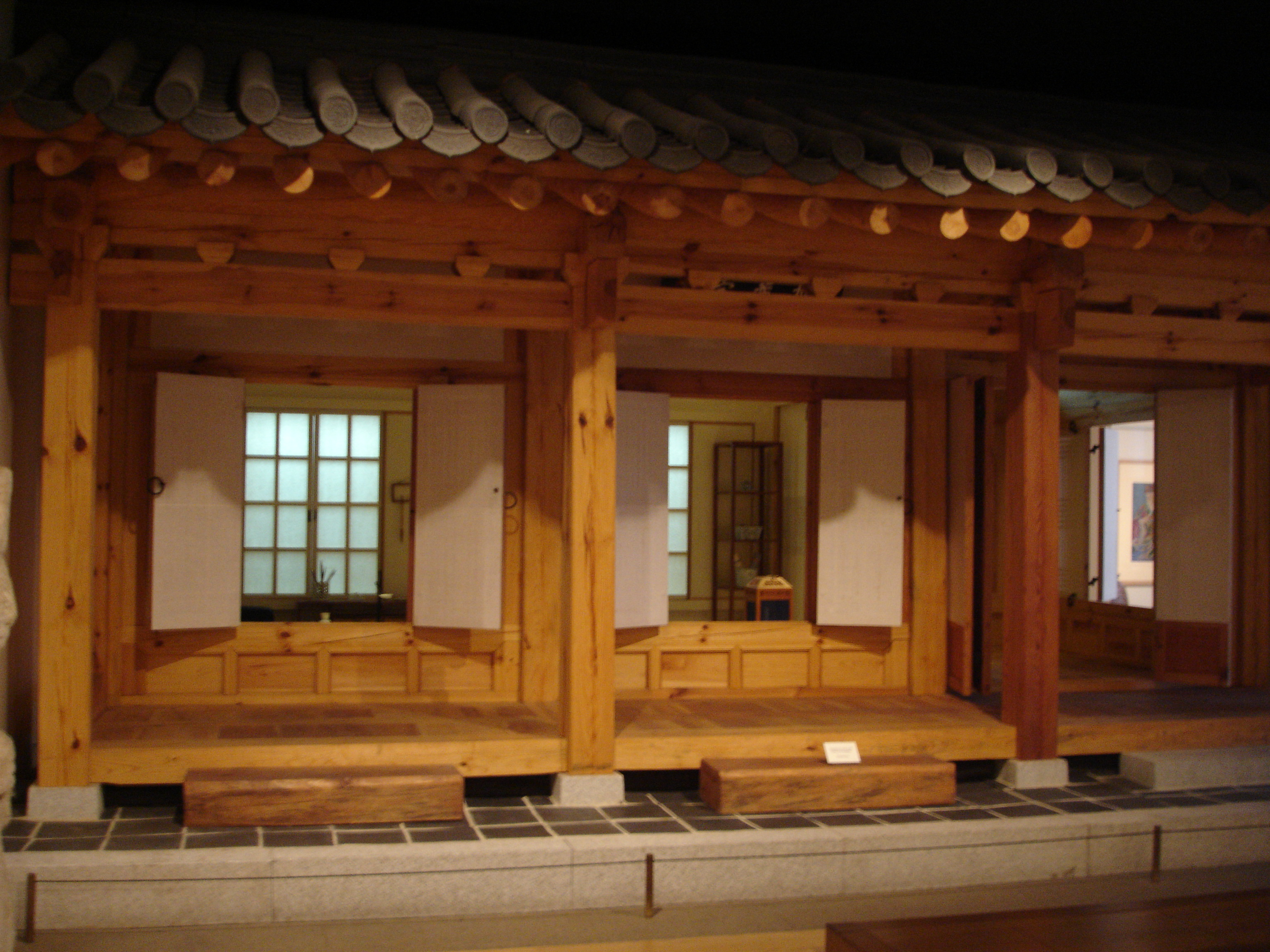
- Traditional Korean sarangbang (study room). Exterior, in the British Museum Department of Asia.

Korean name
- Hangul: 방
- Hanja: 房
- RR: bang
- MR: pang

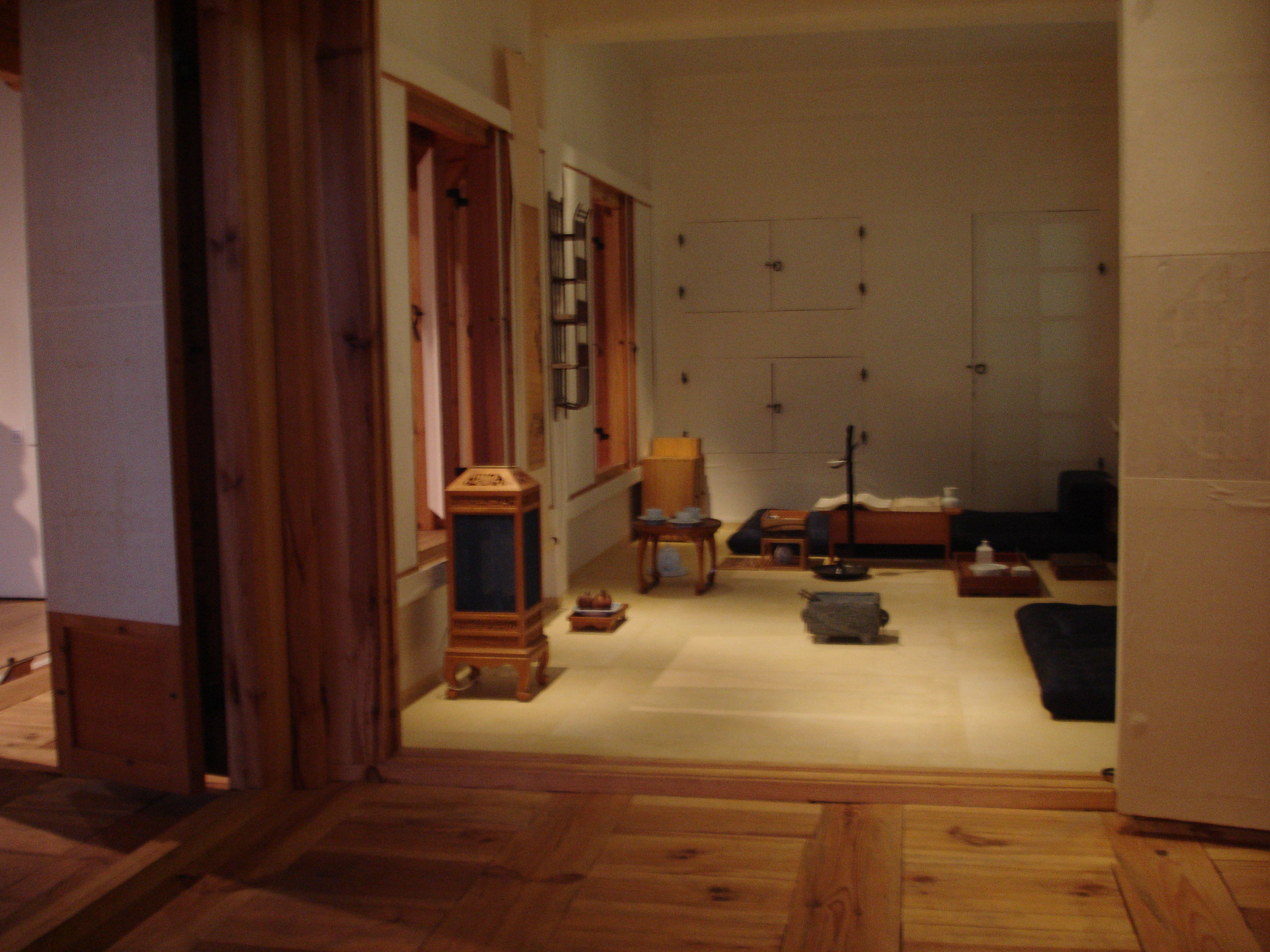
Traditional Korean sarangbang (study room). Interior, in the British Museum Department of Asia.

Bang (Korean: 방) is a Korean word meaning "room". In a traditional Korean house, a sarangbang is the study or drawing room, for example.

In modern Korea (especially in the South), the concept of a bang has expanded and diversified from being merely a walled segment in a domestic space, to including buildings or enterprises in commercial, urban, space, such as a PC bang (an internet café), a noraebang (a karaoke room), sojubang (a soju room, i.e. a pub), manhwabang (a manhwa room, where people read or borrow manhwa) and a jjimjilbang (elaborate Korean public bathhouse). This can be compared with the similar expansion of the concept of a "house" to include upper houses, opera houses, coffee houses, and publishing houses.

Phonetically more tensed word ppang (빵) is used as an abbreviation of a noun gambang (감방; 監房; kambang), meaning "jail".

== Multibang ==
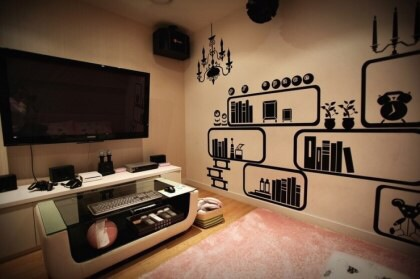
A multibang

Multibang is a kind of entertainment venue in South Korea where people can play video games and board games. In addition, they can eat snacks, drink non-alcoholic beverages, sing, and watch films.

== See also ==
- Contemporary culture of South Korea
- PC bang
- Noraebang
- Manhwabang
- Jjimjilbang
