= T. J. Binyon =

English scholar and crime writer (1936 – 2004)

- Born: Timothy John Binyon; 18 February 1936; Leeds, England
- Died: 7 October 2004 (aged 68); Witney, Oxfordshire, England
- Occupations: Crime writer, scholar
- Relatives: Laurence Binyon (great-uncle); Nicolete Gray (cousin)
- Writing career
- Genre: Crime

Timothy John Binyon (18 February 1936 – 7 October 2004) was an English scholar and crime writer. He was a great-nephew of the poet Laurence Binyon.

== Early life ==
T. J. Binyon was born in Leeds, where his father Denis was a university lecturer. When, aged 18, doing his National Service, he was assigned to the Joint Services School for Linguists in Bodmin, Cornwall, to learn Russian. There, in 1954, the young soldiers, among them Alan Bennett, Michael Frayn and Dennis Potter, were trained to serve as translators and interpreters in the Cold War. It was there that Binyon's interest in Russian language and literature was kindled.

== Education and teaching career ==
He studied at Exeter College, Oxford, but read German and Russian instead of History, which had been his original plan. After graduating he spent a year at Moscow State University. On returning to England, he took up teaching Russian literature at the University of Leeds. Eventually, in 1968, he became a fellow of Wadham College. Oxford, and taught in the Faculty of Medieval and Modern Languages. He served as Dean of Wadham during the 1970s and 80s and retired in the early 2000s.

== Crime fiction author and reviewer ==
Apart from his academic career, Binyon had a great interest in crime fiction. He worked as a reviewer of detective fiction for The Times Literary Supplement and the London Evening Standard and wrote a theoretical book—"Murder Will Out": The Detective in Fiction (OUP, 1989)—and two crime novels, Swan Song (1982) and Greek Gifts (1988).

As emeritus, Binyon became a prize-winning author with a biography of Aleksandr Pushkin, Pushkin: A Biography (2002), it was the Samuel Johnson Prize winner of 2003. The book received critical acclaim and was praised by John Bayley in Literary Review: "No other work on Pushkin on the same scale, and with the same grasp of atmosphere and detail, exists in English, or in any other language apart from Russian."

== Marriages and death ==
Binyon was married twice, first to Felicity Butterwick (1974–1992) and, after a divorce, to Helen Ellis (from 2000 up to his death). He died, aged 68, of sudden heart failure in his house in Witney, Oxfordshire, while doing research for what was to be his next book, on Mikhail Lermontov.
