= British Museum Department of Asia =

Department in the British Museum

Coordinates: 51.52032°N 0.12800°W

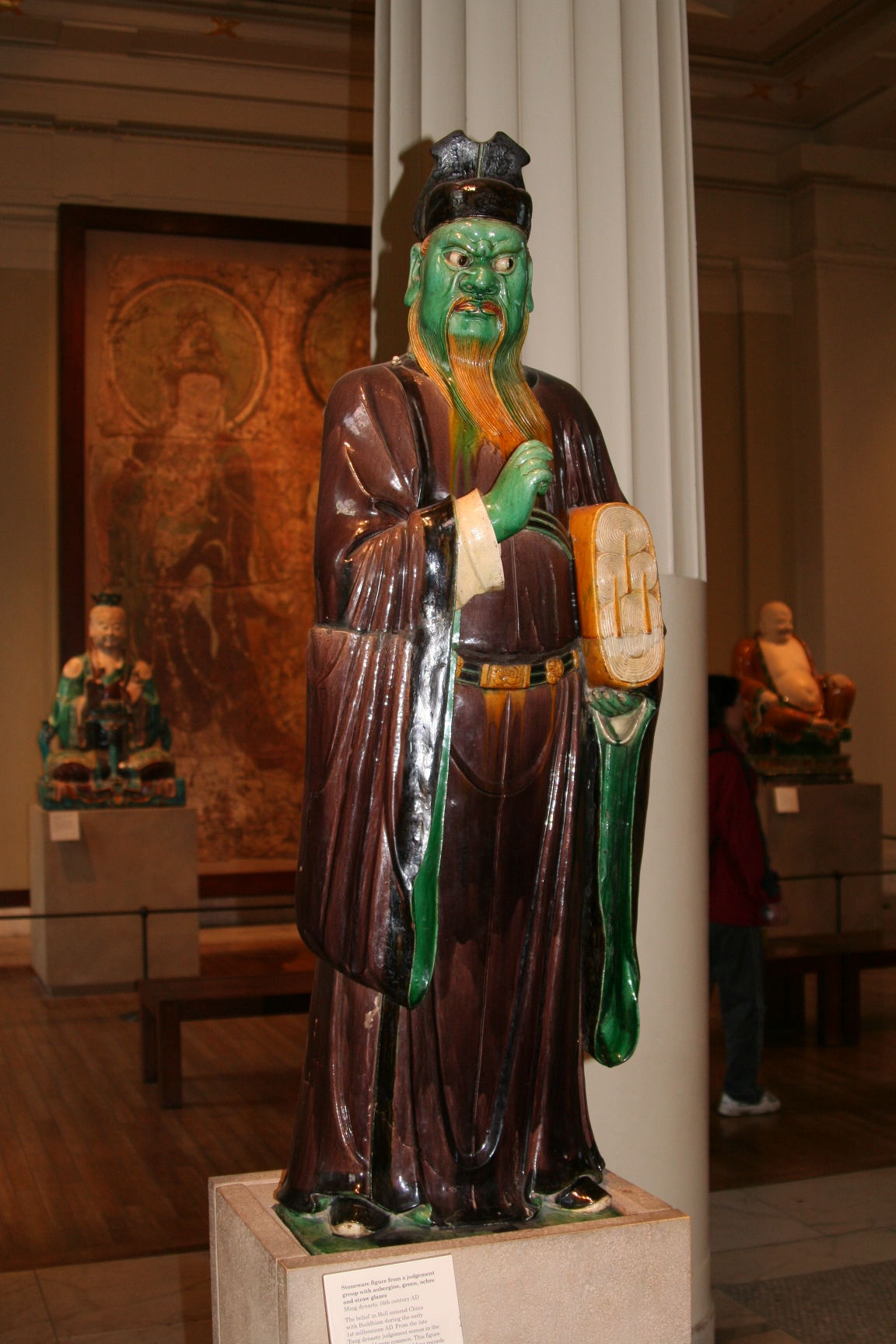
Chinese stoneware statue of a judgement figure, 16th century, Ming Dynasty.

The Department of Asia in the British Museum holds one of the largest collections of historical objects from Asia. These collections comprise over 75,000 objects covering the material culture of the Asian continent (including East Asia, South and Central Asia, and Southeast Asia), and dating from the Neolithic age up to the present day.

== History ==
The department's collection began with a donation from Sir Hans Sloane, which contained a small number of objects from the Asian continent, including a collection of Japanese material acquired from the family of the German traveller and physician Engelbert Kaempfer (who had led an expedition to Japan). Only a few objects were acquired from Asia between 1753 and the 1820s, but the collection expanded in the late 19th century to become one of the world's largest. This was mainly through a donation of a number of South Asian objects, such as the gilded bronze figure of Tara from Sri Lanka in 1830, the Bridge Collection of East and Central Indian sculpture in 1872, and the Amaravati Collection in 1880. The collection of Asian material was greatly expanded during the tenure of Sir Augustus Wollaston Franks as Keeper of the Department of Antiquities from 1866 to 1896, and in 1921 the Sub-Department of Oriental Antiquities was established. In 1933, the Asian collections of the Prints and Drawings Sub-Department were united with the Department of Oriental Antiquities, forming one of the most significant collections of art and antiquities of Asia in the northern hemisphere. In 2003, the Department of Oriental Antiquities and the Department of Japanese Antiquities merged to become the current Department of Asia. The Keepers of the Department of Asia include: Jessica Rawson, Robert Knox (1994–2006), Jan Stuart (2006–2014) and Jane Portal (2014–).

== Highlights of the collection ==
Highlights include:

- The most comprehensive collection of sculpture from the Indian subcontinent in the world, including the celebrated Buddhist limestone reliefs from Amaravati.
- An outstanding collection of Chinese art and antiquities, paintings, porcelain, lacquer, bronze, jade, and other applied arts.
- A fine collection of Buddhist paintings from Dunhuang, and the Admonitions Scroll by Gu Kaizhi.
- A broad range of Islamic art in pottery and tiles, paintings, metalwork, glass, seals, and inscriptions.
- The most comprehensive collection of pre-20th century Japanese decorative arts in the Western world.

== The layout and collections of the department ==
Most of the Department of Asia is located in the King Edward's Building, which forms the northern section of the museum. It is split into several rooms and four main geographic areas:

- The China, South and South East Asia section is located in rooms 33 (Sir Joseph Hotung Gallery for China and South Asia) on the ground floor. This gallery reopened in November 2017 after a refurbishment.
- Amaravati, Buddhism-related carving gallery is located in room 33a (Asahi Shimbun Gallery) on the ground floor, at the western end of room 33.
- Chinese jade gallery (Selwyn and Ellie Alleyne Gallery) is located in room 33b on the ground floor.
- The Sir Percival David Collection of Chinese ceramics is located in room 95 on the upper floor
- The Islam section is located in room 34 on the ground floor.
- The Japan section is located in rooms 92–94 on the upper floor.
- The Korea section is located in rooms 67 on the upper floor

=== China, South and South East Asia collection (including India) ===
The China collection is one of the largest collections of Chinese historical artefacts in the Western world. It focuses on porcelain, paintings, scripts and basic tools, with items ranging in date from the Neolithic era to the 20th century. One of the most important items is a collection of rare Buddhist paintings from Dunhuang. China was one of the first countries to use coins, and the museum also has a large collection of Chinese coins (housed in the Department of Coins and Medals).

Objects in the South Asian collections of the department date from some of the earliest civilisations in the Indus valley, about 7000 years ago. It includes an important collection of prehistoric material from the Nilgiri mountains in southern India . As well as ancient artefacts, the Indian collections include excellent examples of pottery, art (including many rare Mughal paintings), traditional scriptwork, and a large display of sculpture, including carvings from the Great Stupa at Amaravati. South Asia is also represented in the money collections, with a large number of coins dating back to the 4th century BC. The collection previously included some objects from the Islamic world, but these were merged with the collections of the Department of the Ancient Near East to form the Department of the Middle East.

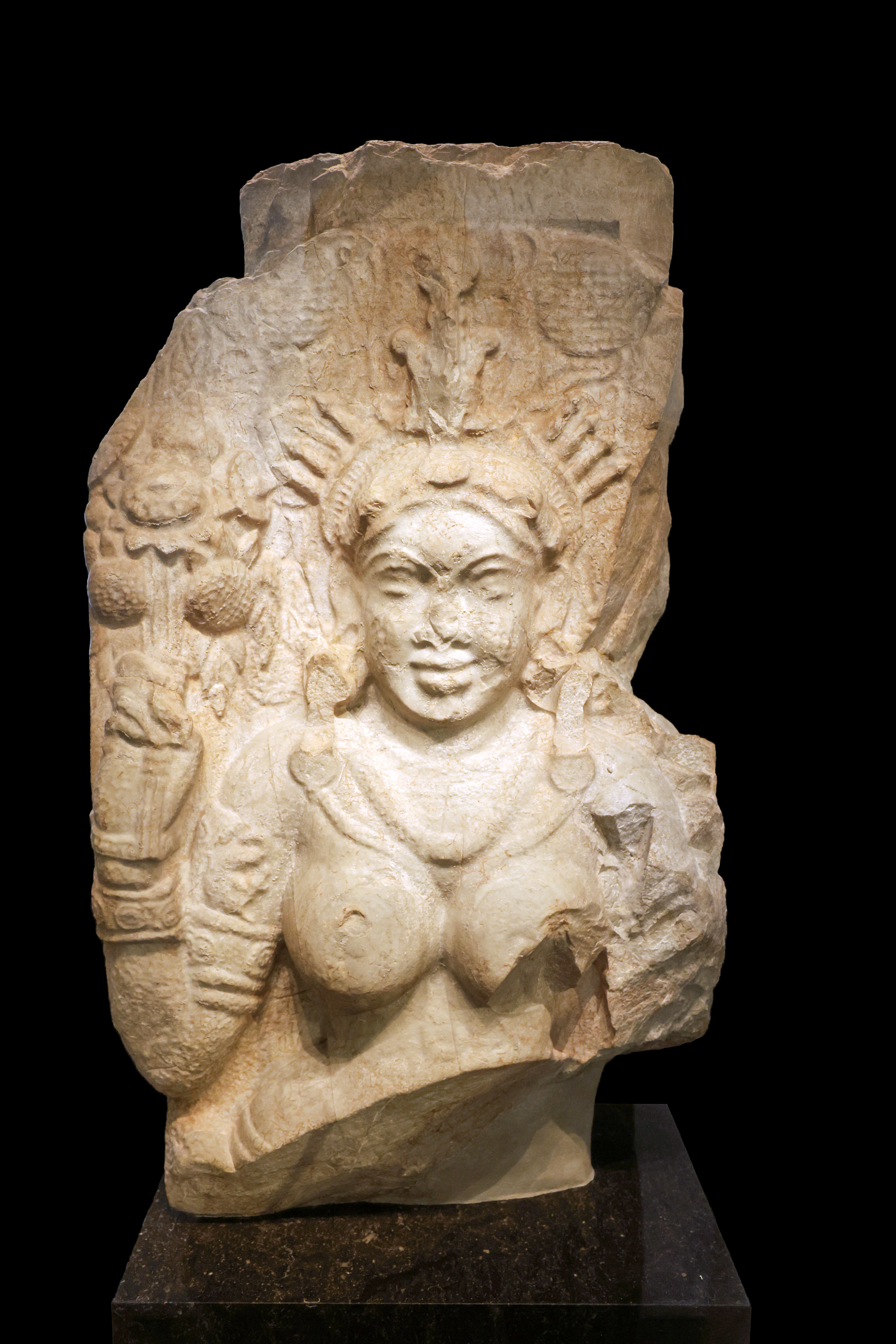
Carved limestone goddess, 1st–2nd Century

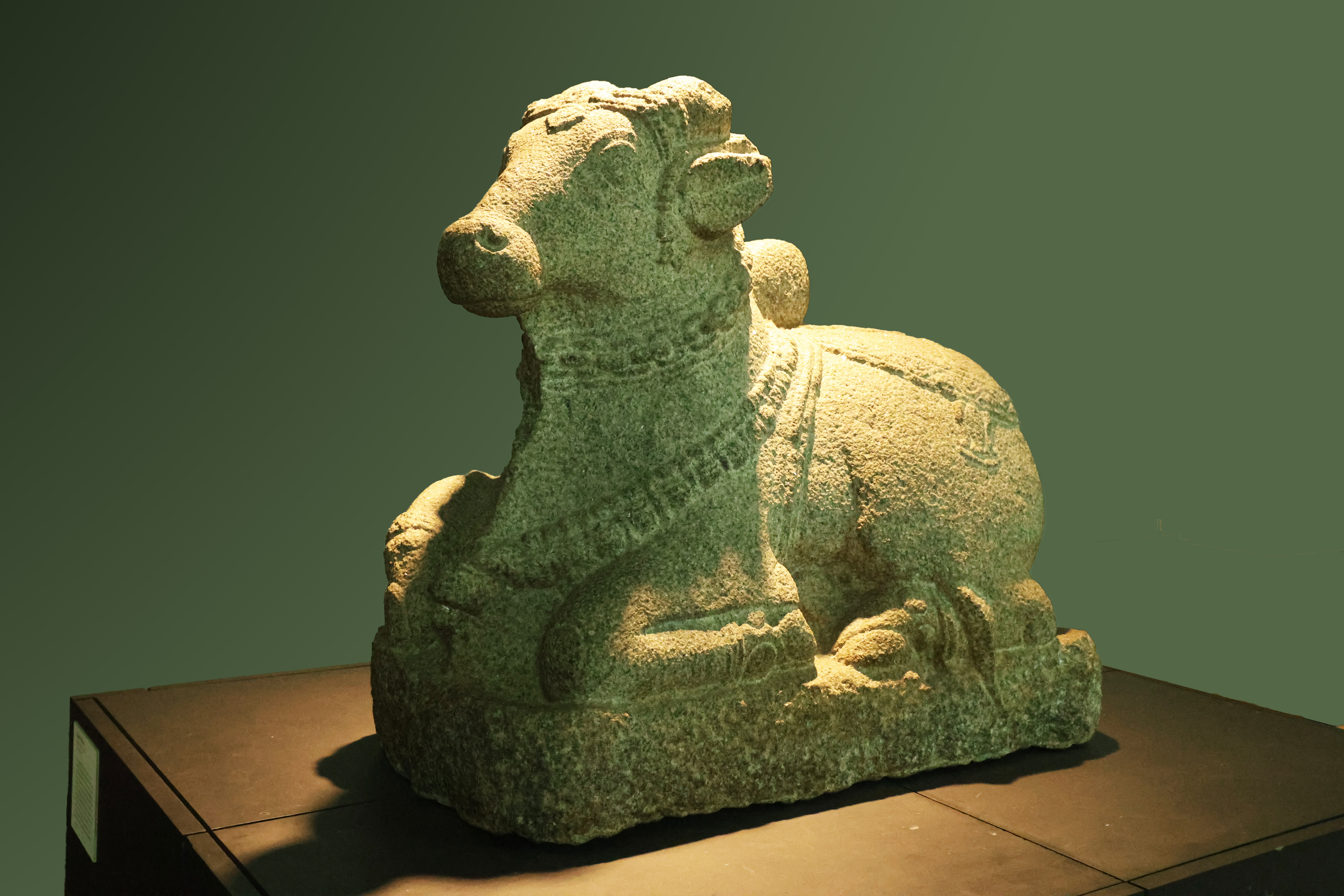
Figure of Nandi, 16th Century

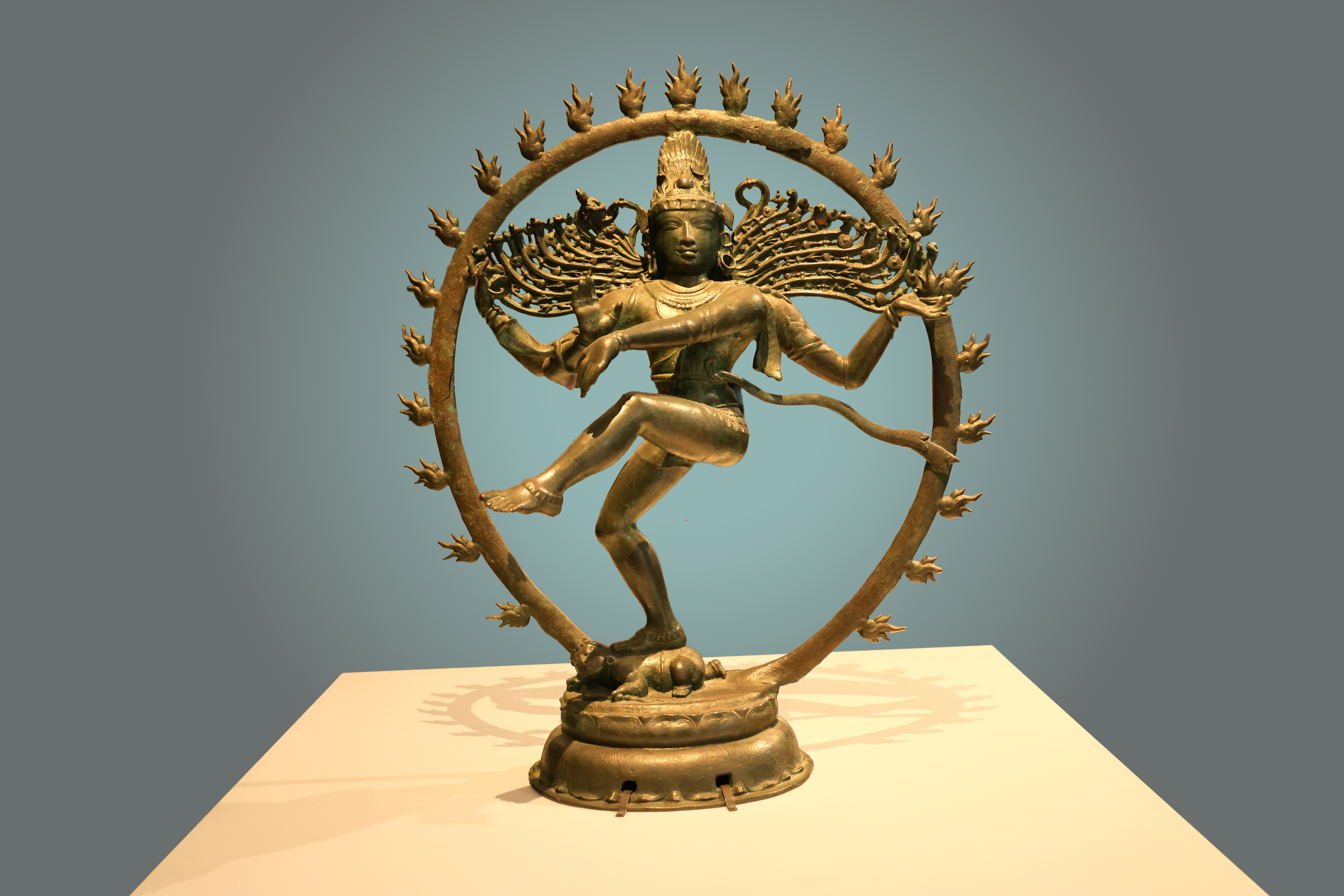
Statue of Lord Shiva Nataraja

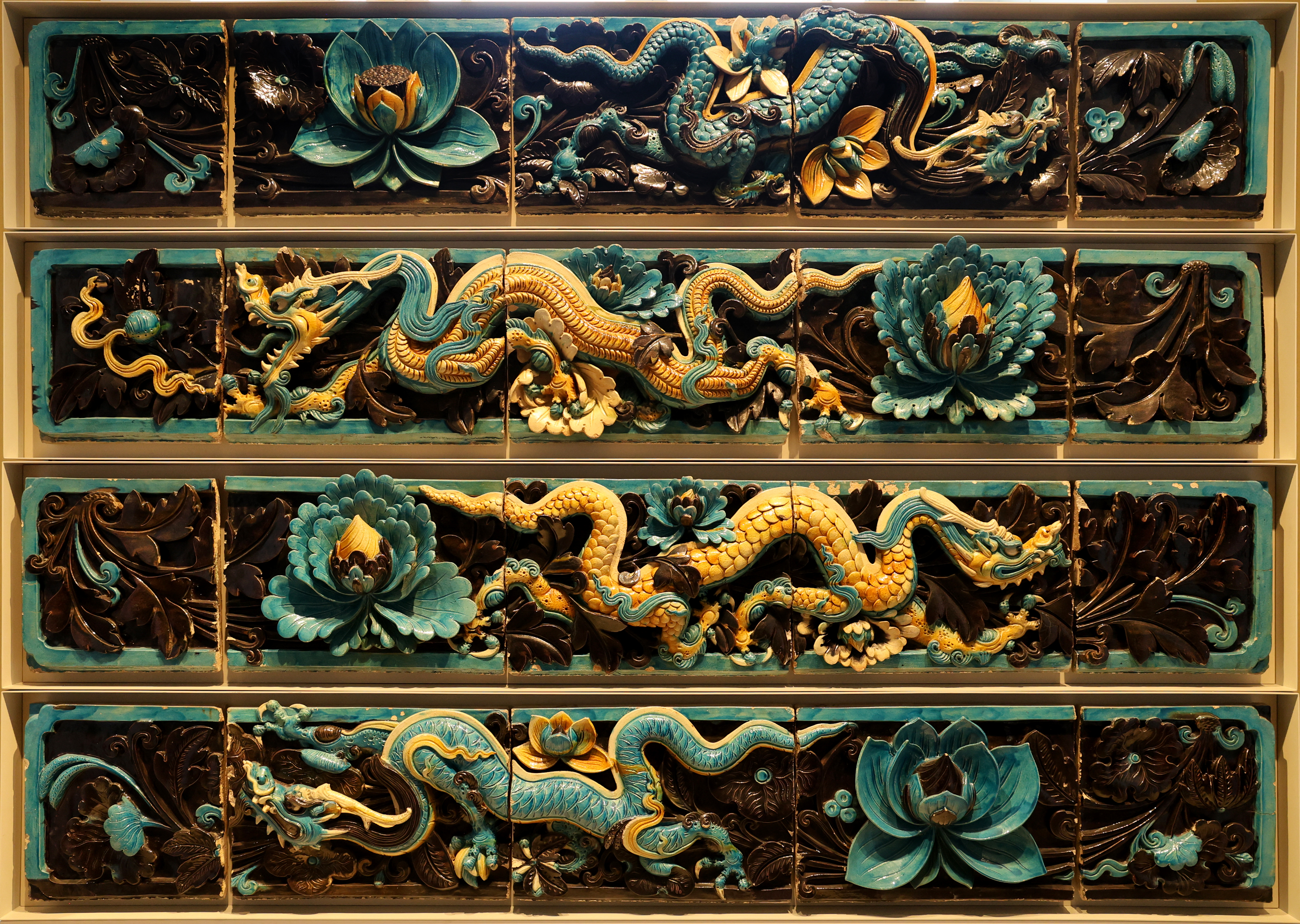
Glazed dragon tiles, 15th–16th Century

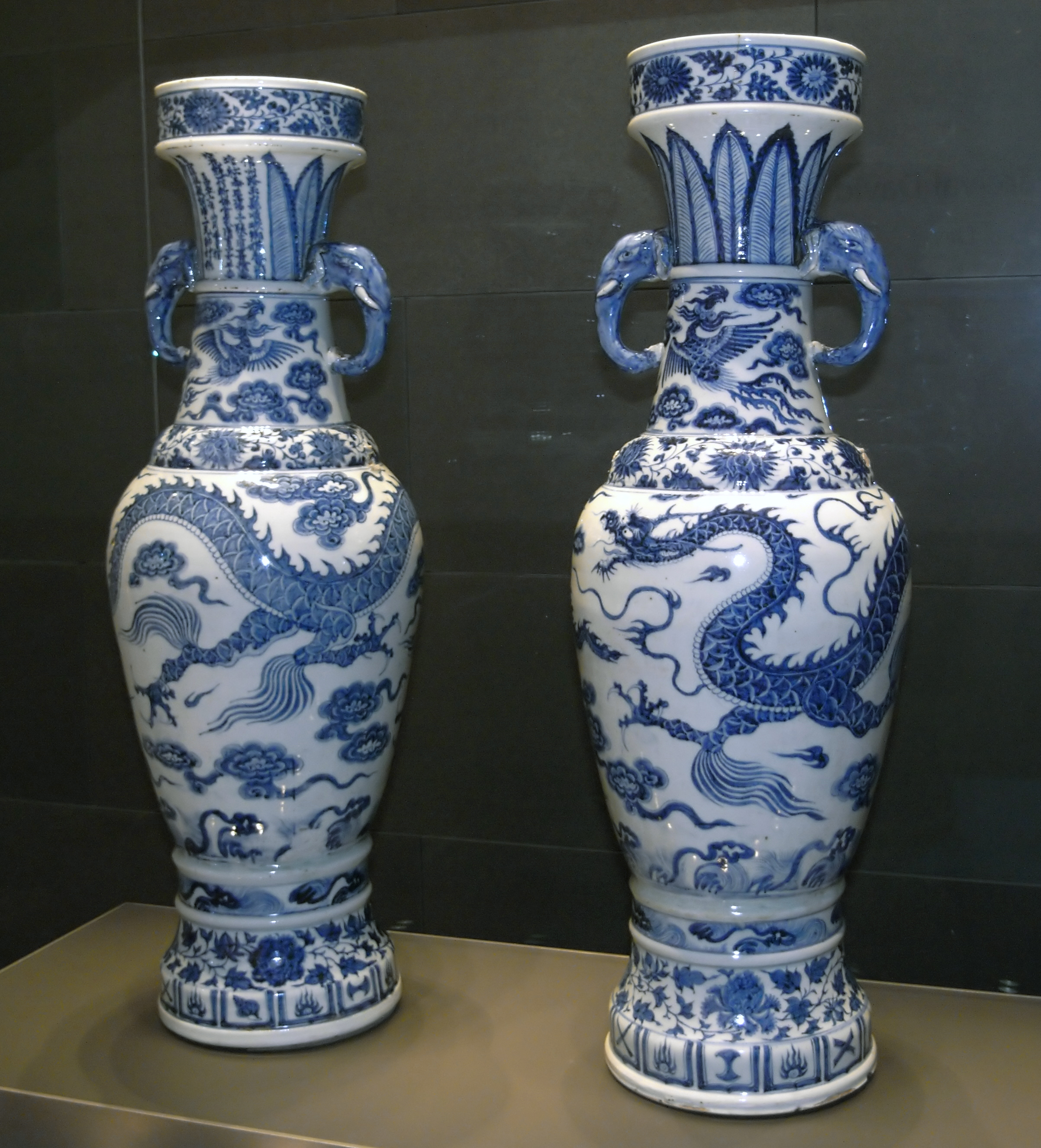
The David Vases in Room 95

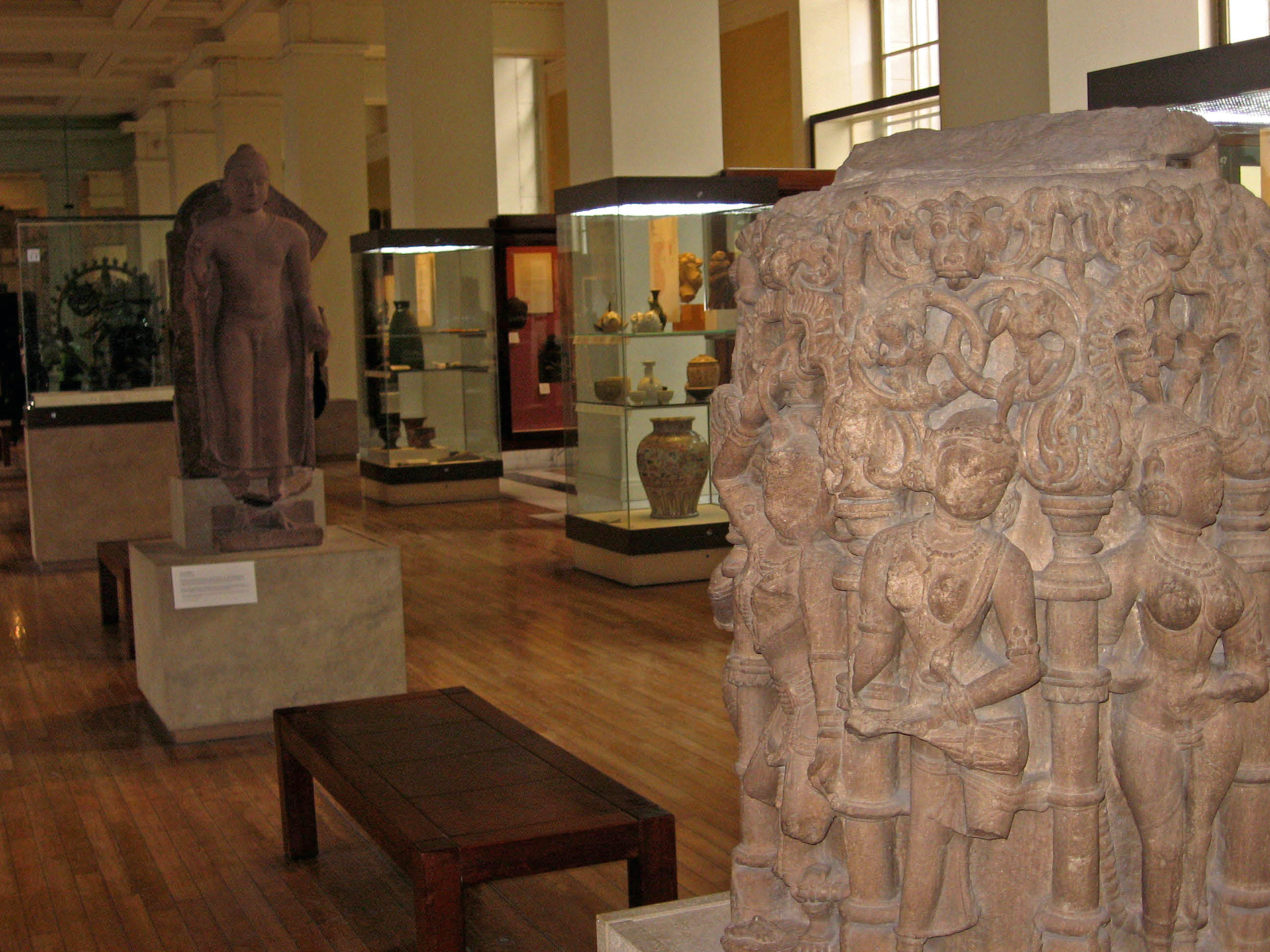
Asian Gallery: India Section

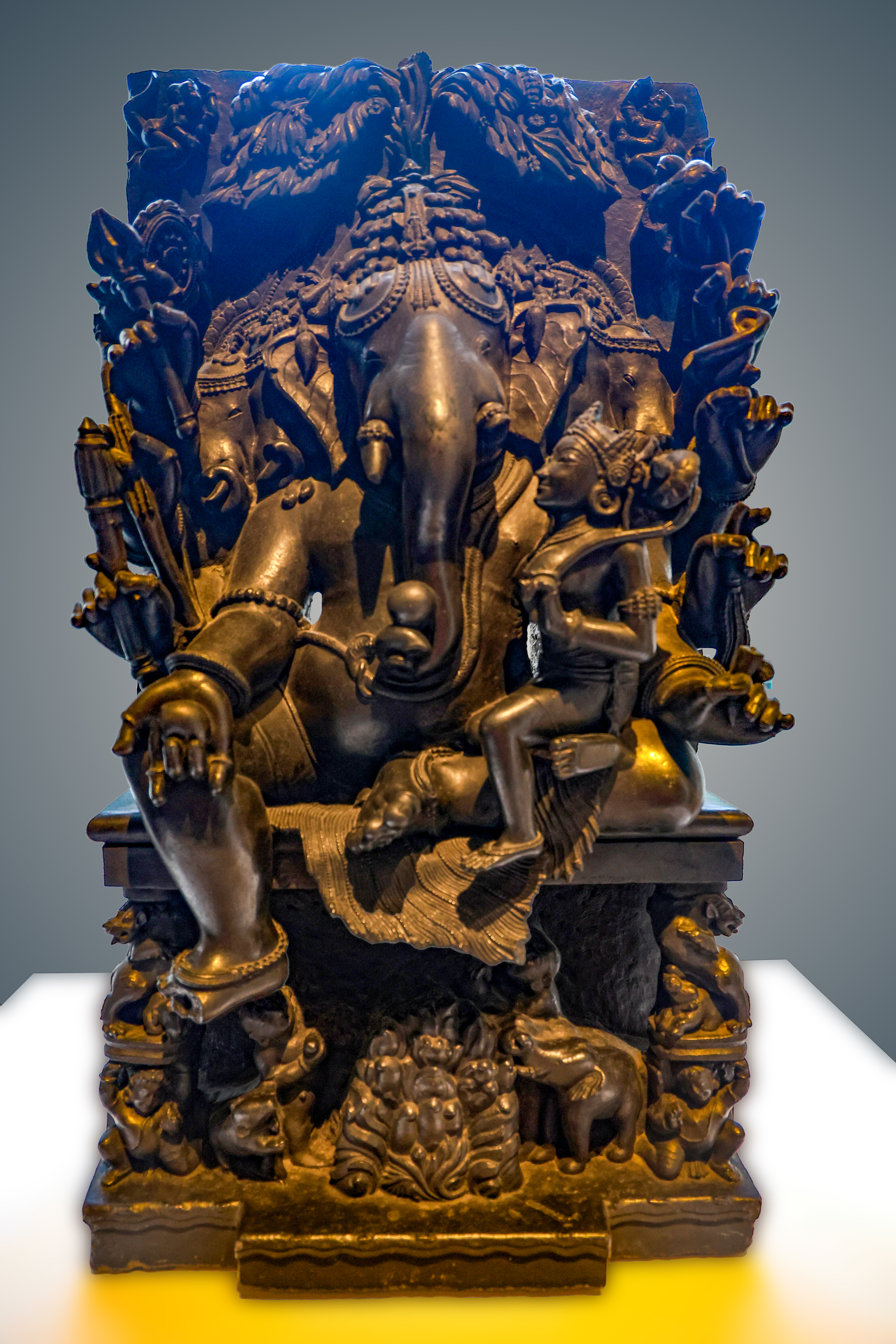
Seated stone figure of Lord Gaṇesha, 13th Century

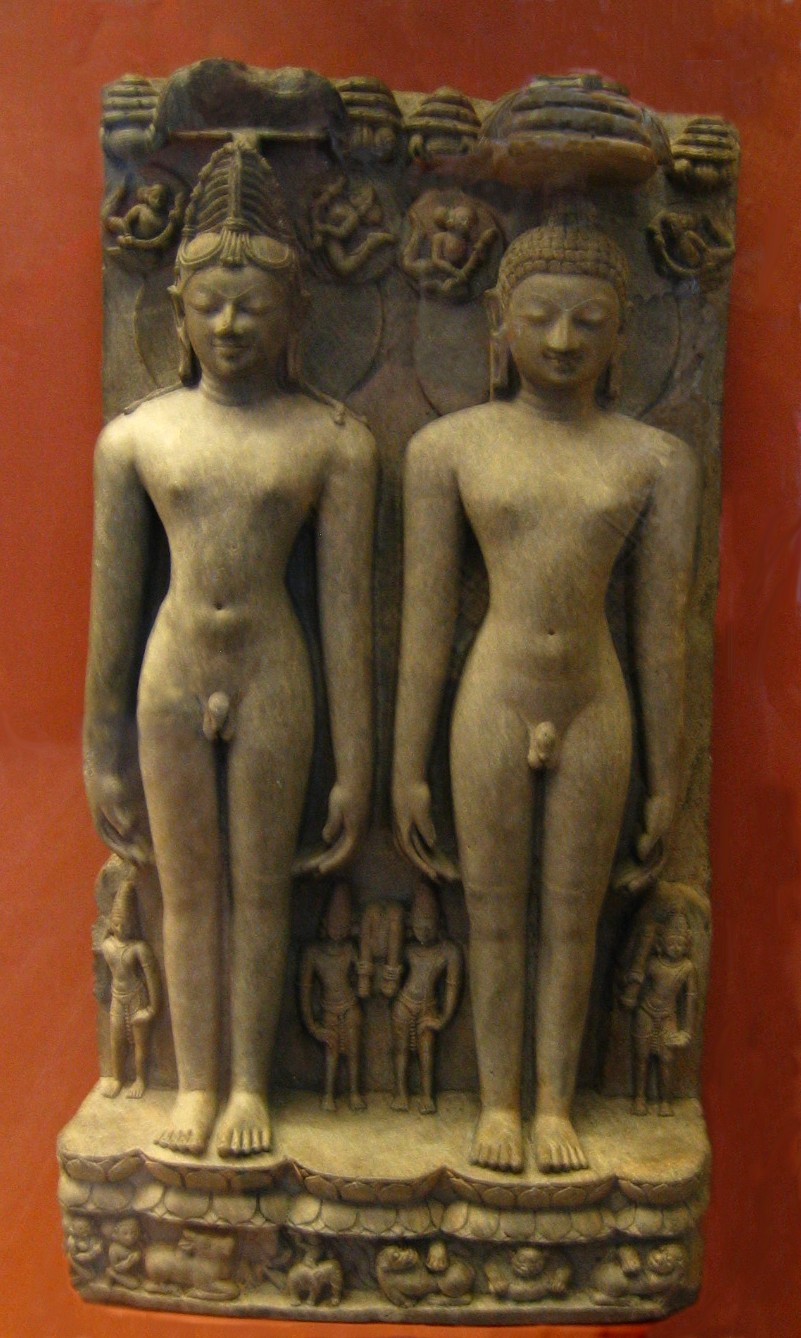
Sculpture of the two Jain tirthankaras Rishabhanatha and Mahavira, Orissa, India, 11th–12th century AD

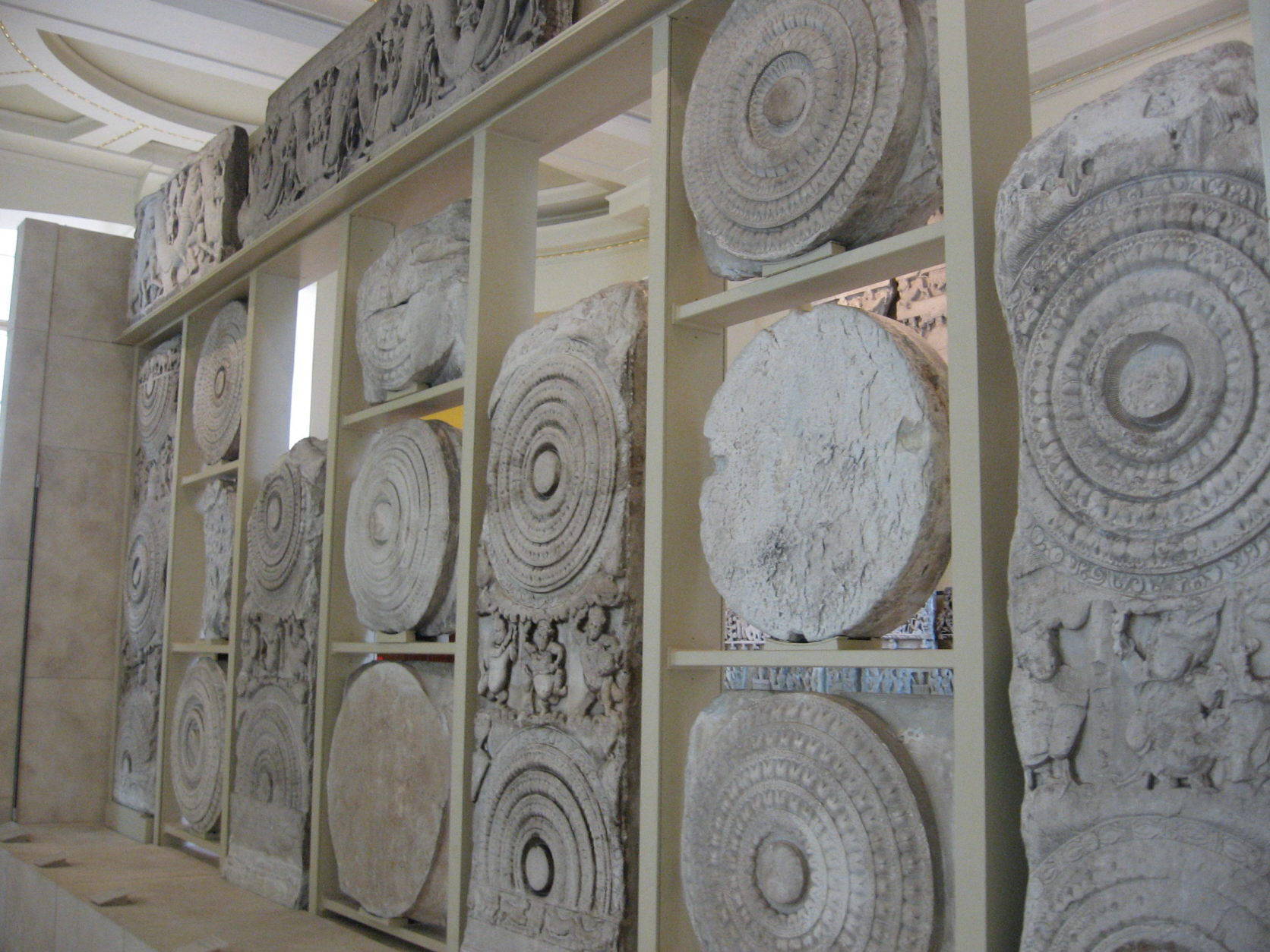
Amravati Gallery

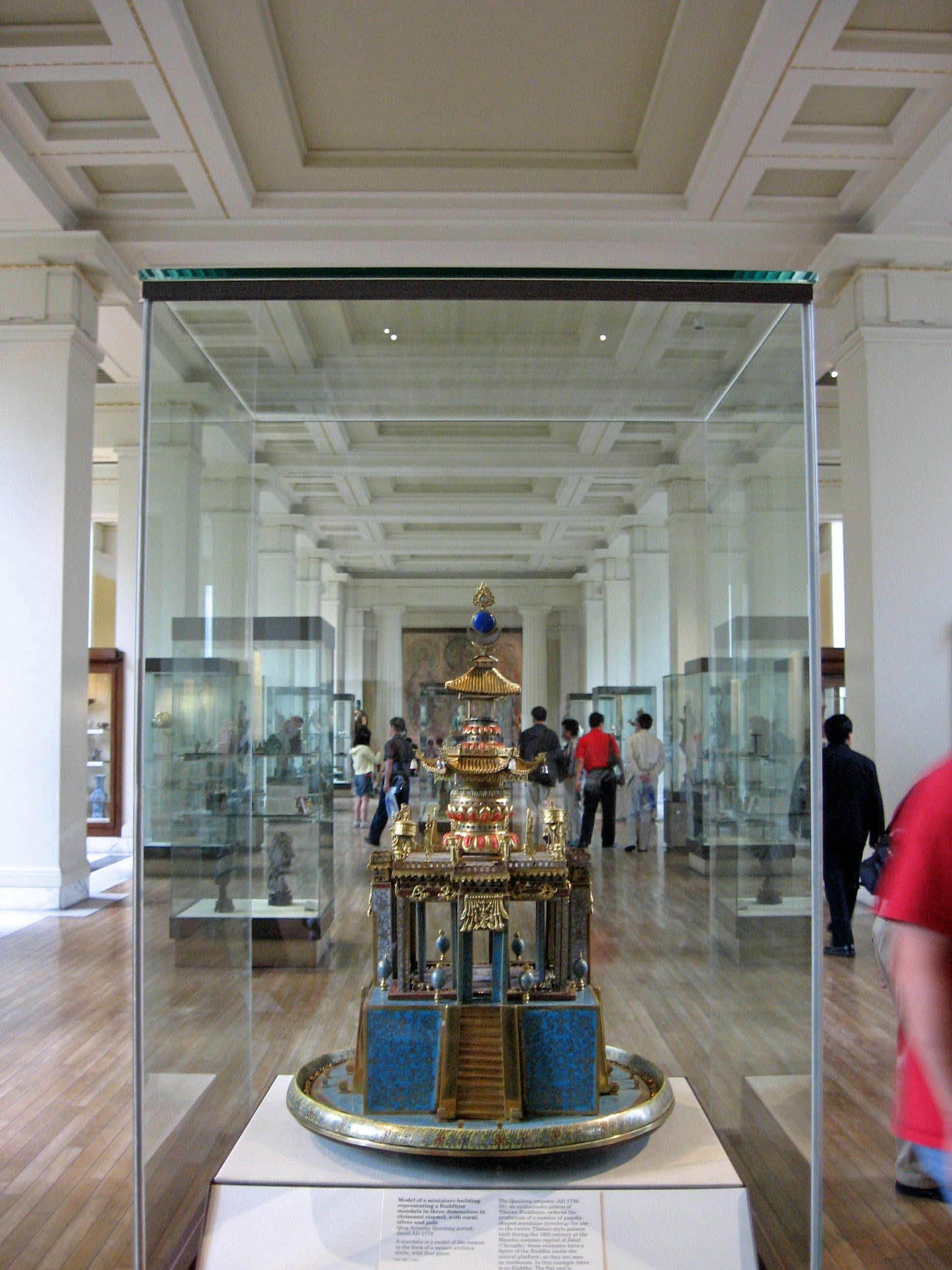
Asian Gallery: China Section

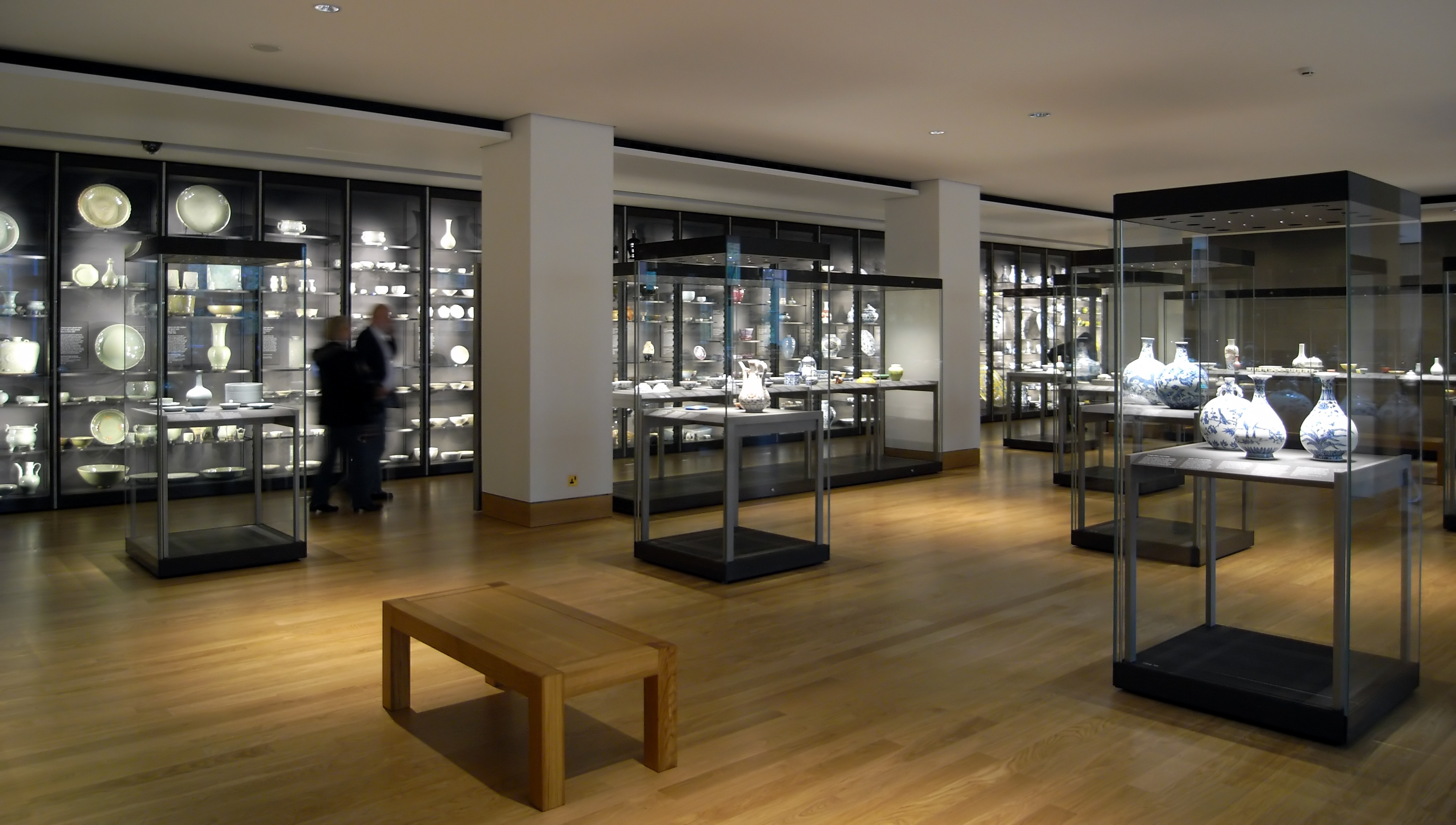
Room 95, the Sir Percival David Collection

=== Islam collection ===
The John Addis gallery (room 34) houses the museum's collection of Islamic art, which now officially forms part of the Department of Middle East. This includes objects from the earliest centuries of Islam to the 20th century, and geographically from Egypt to Spain to India. The gallery's arrangement is mainly chronological, with western Islam – Egypt, Syria, Iraq and Turkey — on the left of the descending staircase, and eastern Islam — Iran, Afghanistan and India – on the right. Highlights of the collection are a ceramic lamp from the Dome of the Rock in Jerusalem, the unique Jade Terrapin from Allahabad, a Mughal work of art from northern India, and a group of foundation inscriptions from Gaur, West Bengal in eastern India. At the end of the gallery are cases on Islamic Spain, science, arms and armour, coinage and a changing exhibition of contemporary graphics. The British Museum is actively collecting 20th-century material from the Islamic world, including calligraphy, popular religious prints, political posters, studio pottery and a rare 11th-century Qur'an.

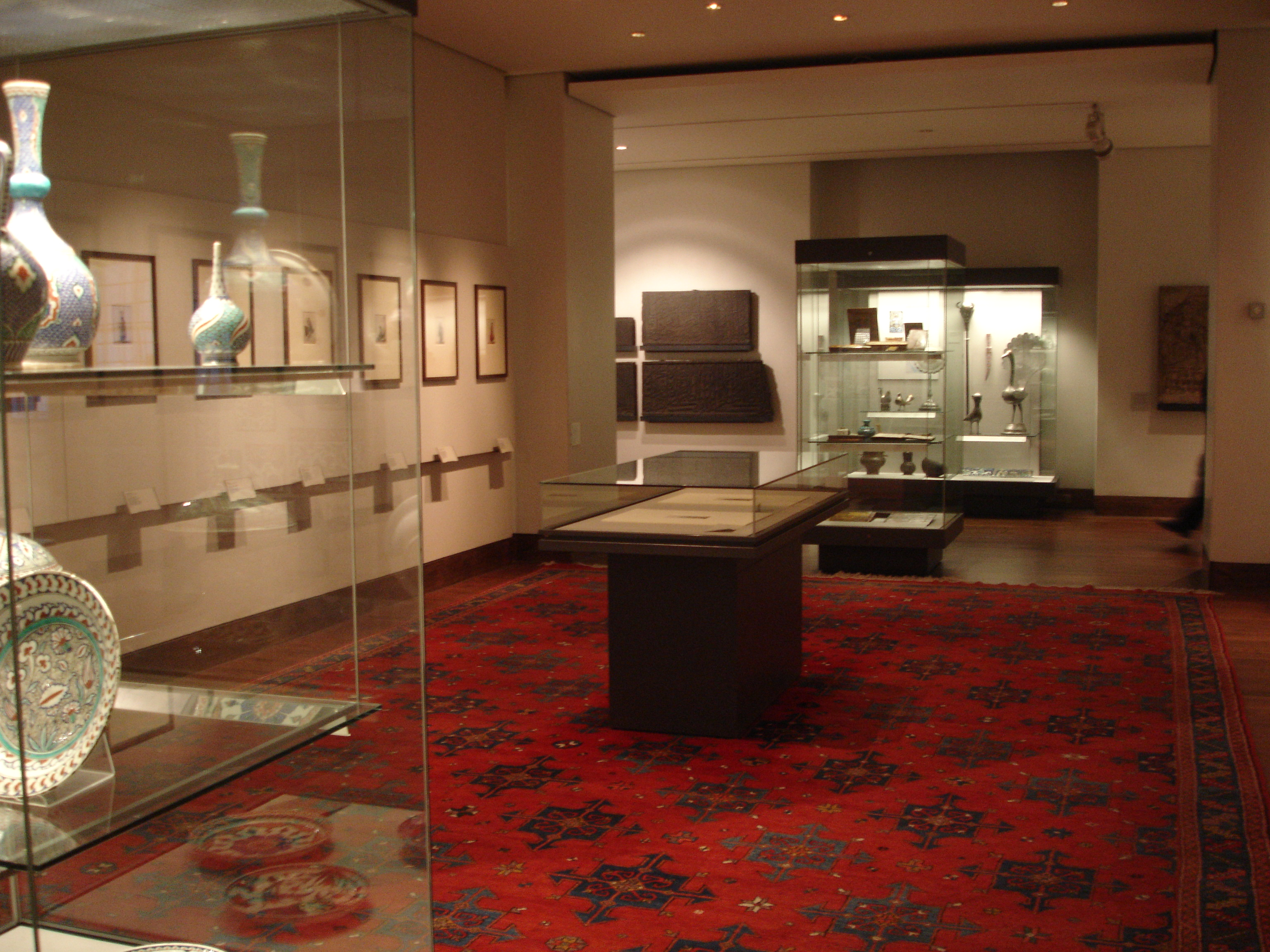
The John Addis Gallery

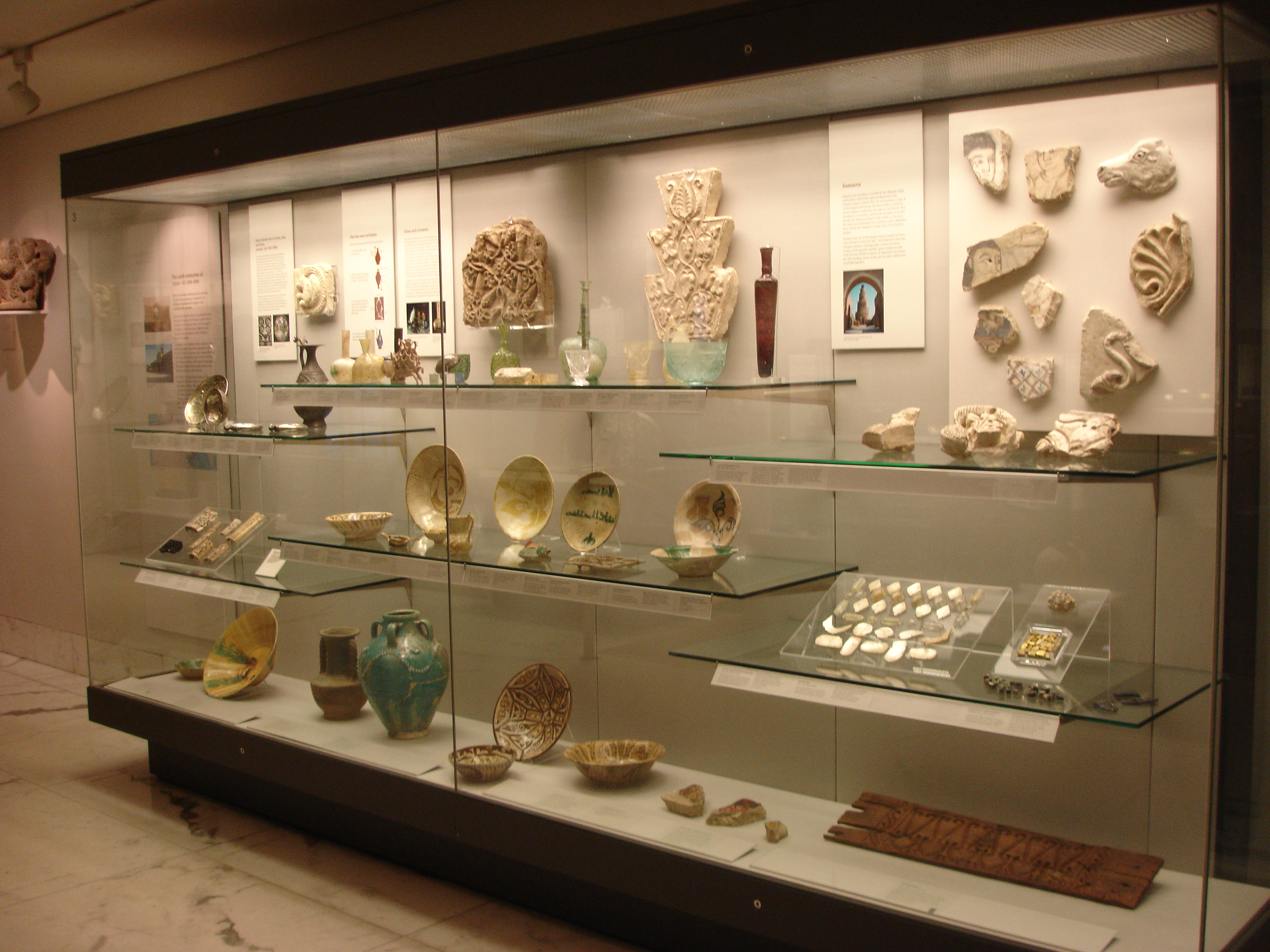
The John Addis Gallery

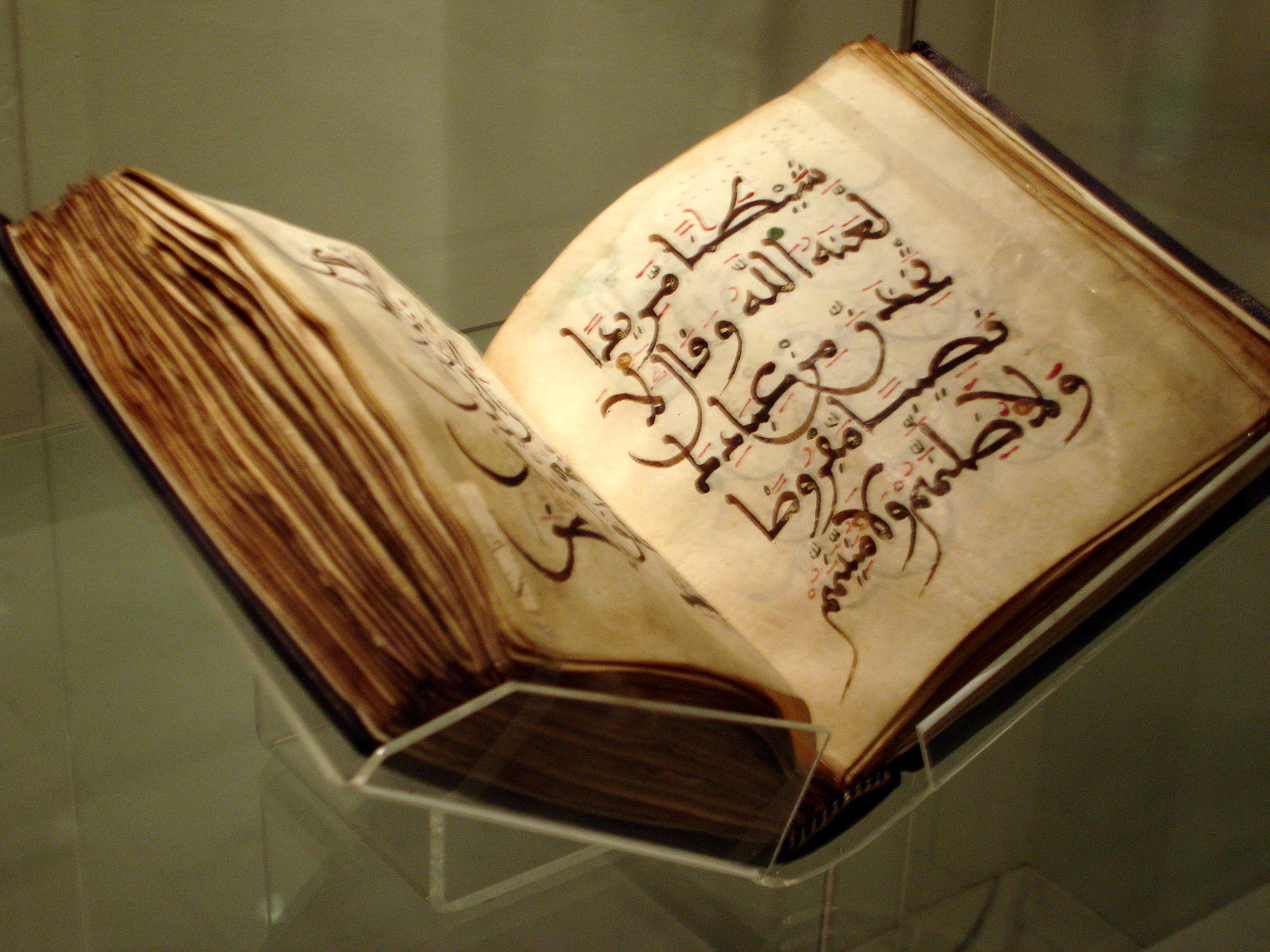
11th-century North African Qur'an

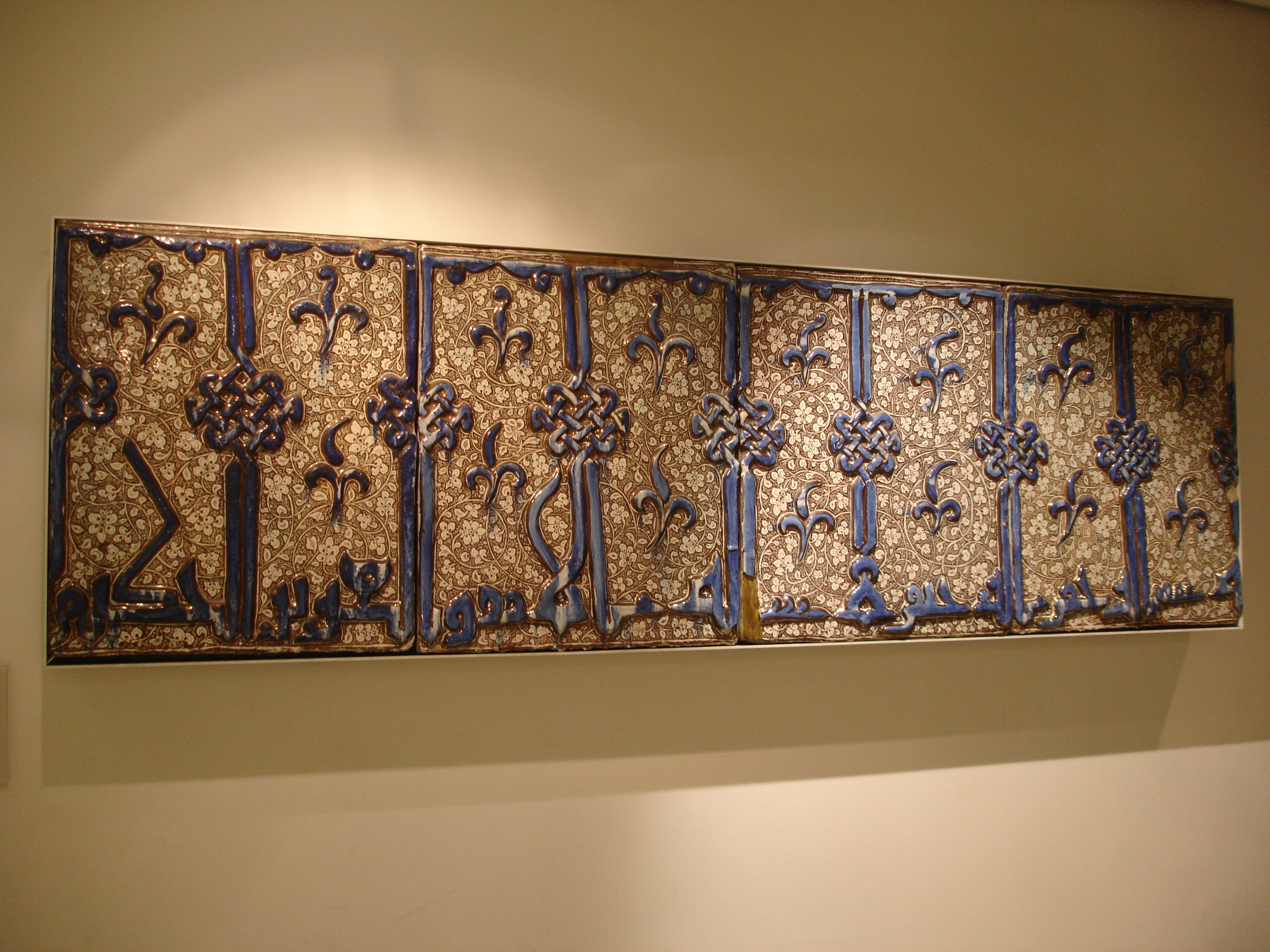
13th-century Arabic frieze

=== Japan collection ===
The Japanese section of the Asian department holds one of the most comprehensive collections of Japanese material culture in Europe. The Japanese galleries, Rooms 92–94 (the Konica-Minolta, Main and Urasenke galleries), were opened on 6 April 1990, and include prints, printed books, paintings, ceramics, swords, decorative arts, and early archaeological material. Part of the collection includes a tea house, sponsored and built by the Urasenke Foundation, which exhibits both modern tea utensils and historic tea ceremony wares.

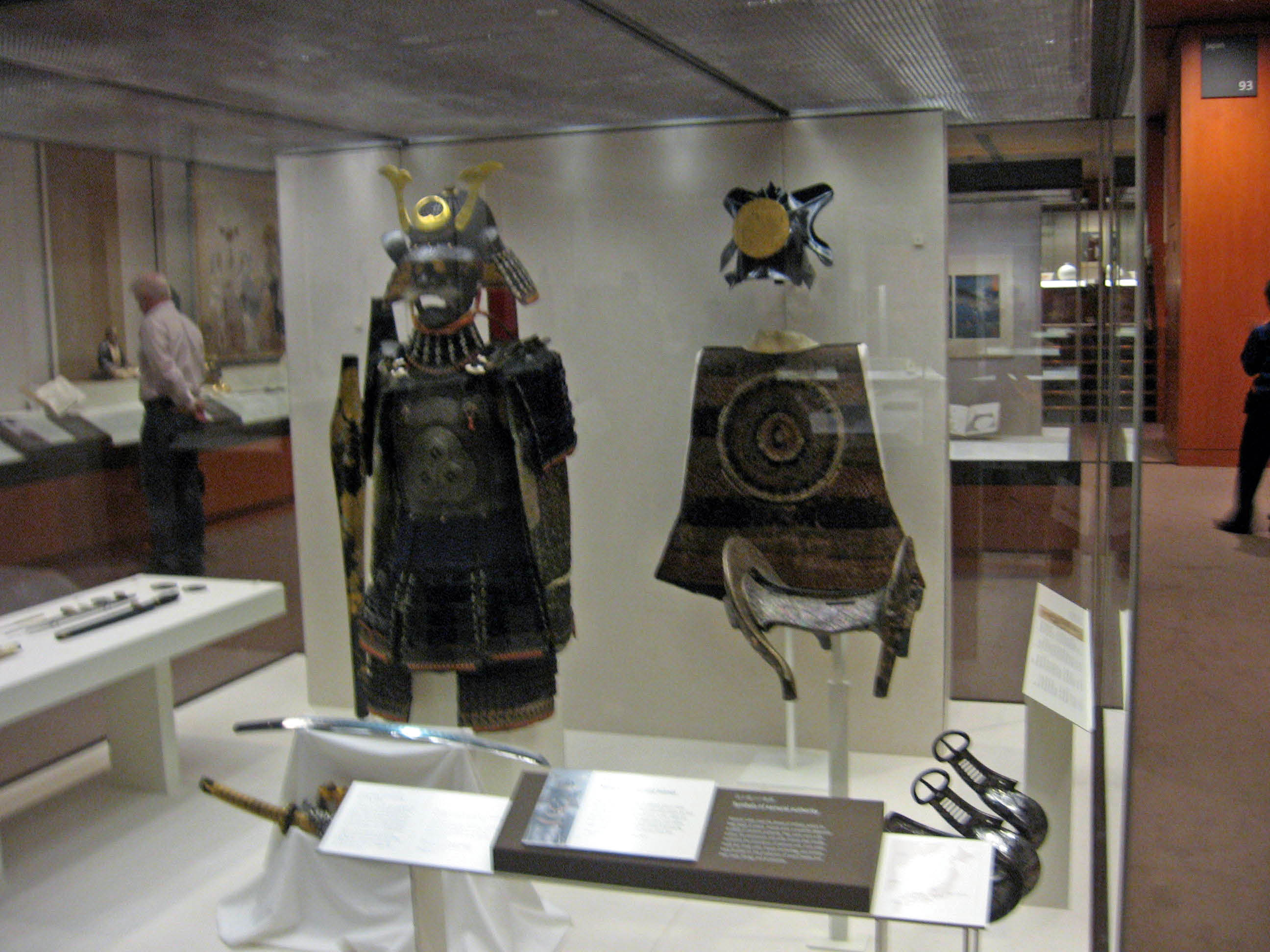
British Museum, Japanese section – Samurai armour

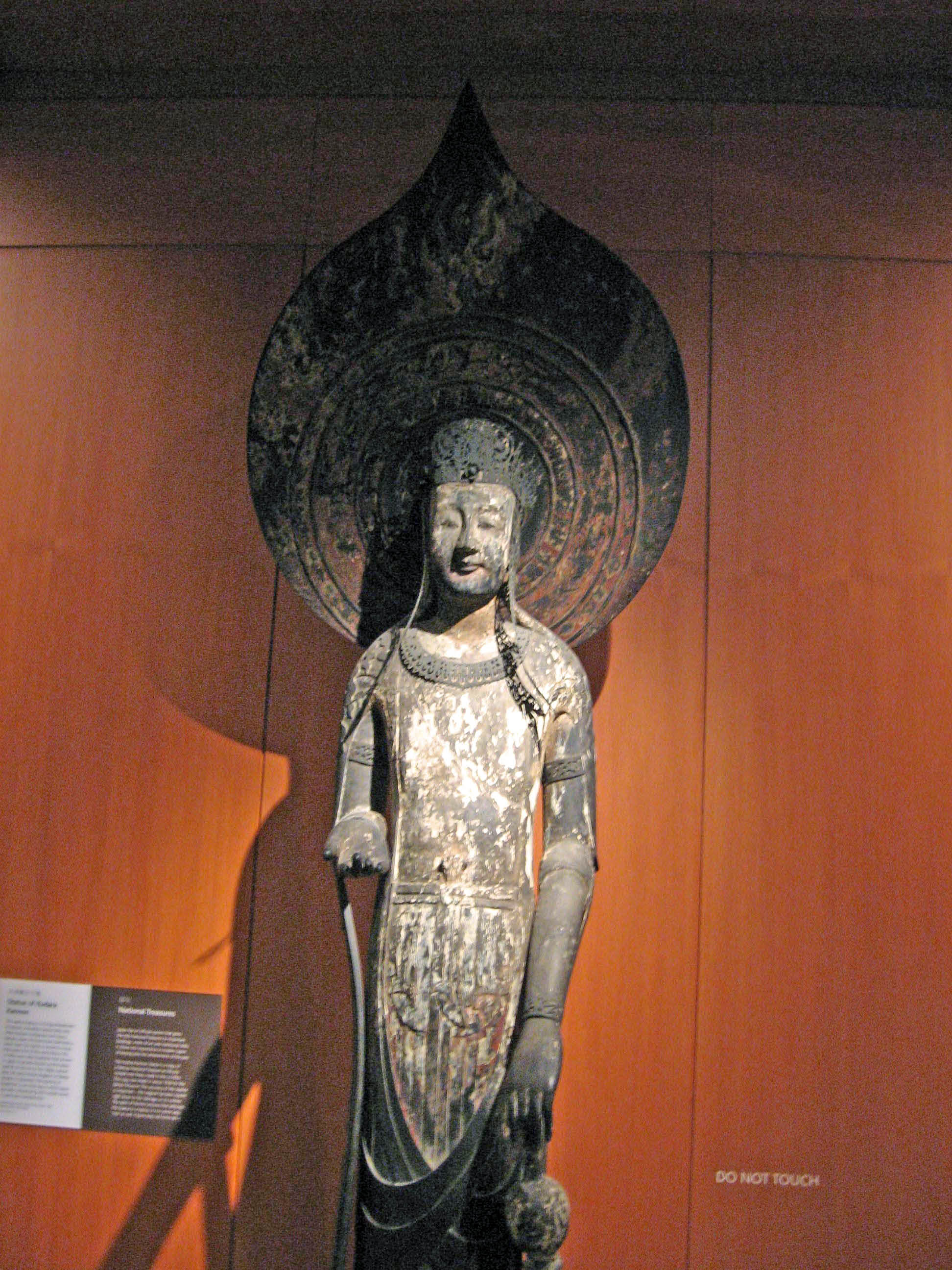
British Museum, Japanese section – Boddhisattva

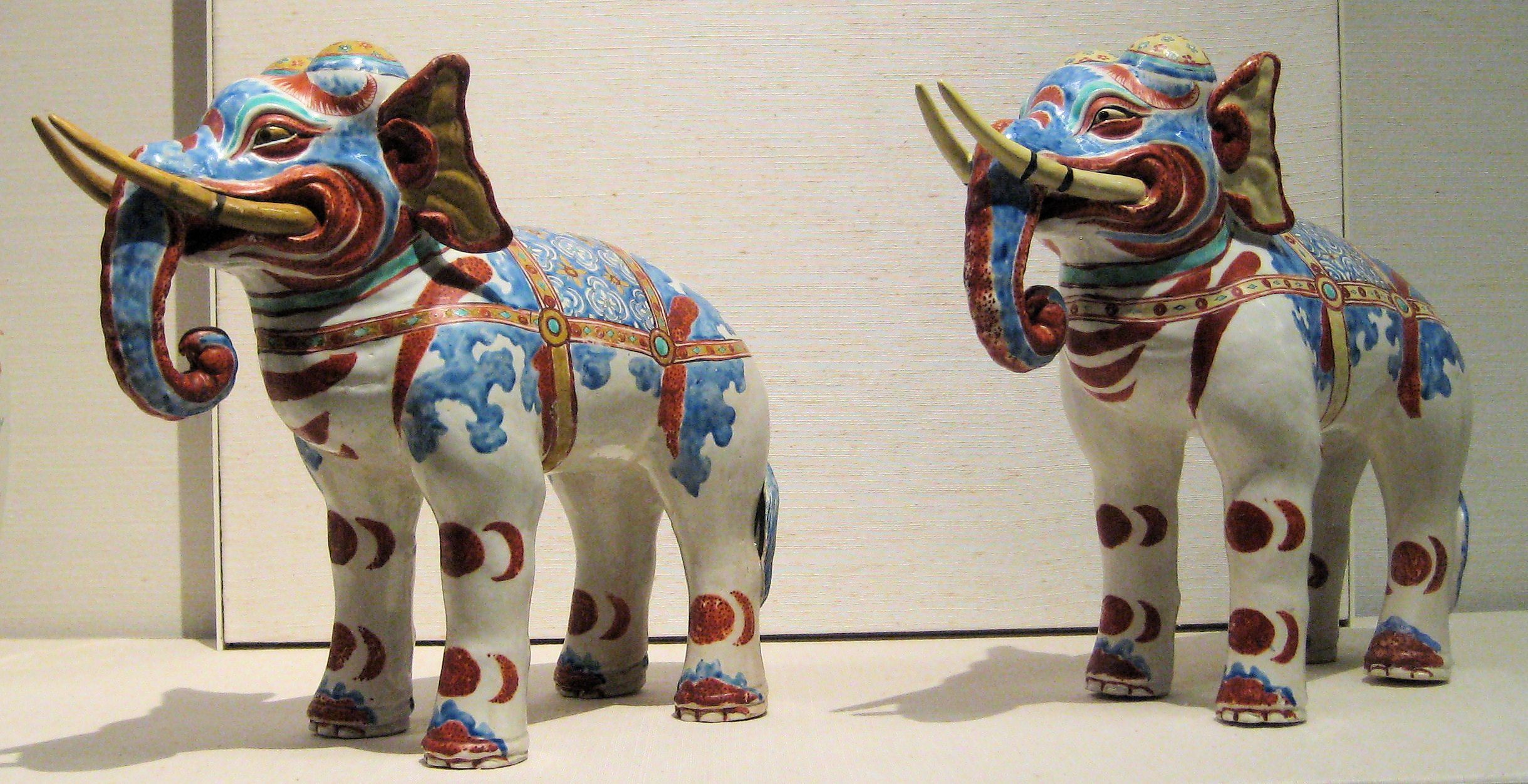
British Museum Kakiemon elephants

=== Korea collection ===
The Korea Foundation Gallery houses the museum's collection of Korean art and archaeology. Objects from pre-history to the present day include stone sculpture, paintings, printed books, screens and folk art, as well as ceramics, lacquerware, gold and bronze. Highlights of the exhibition include a reconstruction of a traditional Korean sarangbang (a study in a Korean home) and fine examples of 15th-century Korean script.

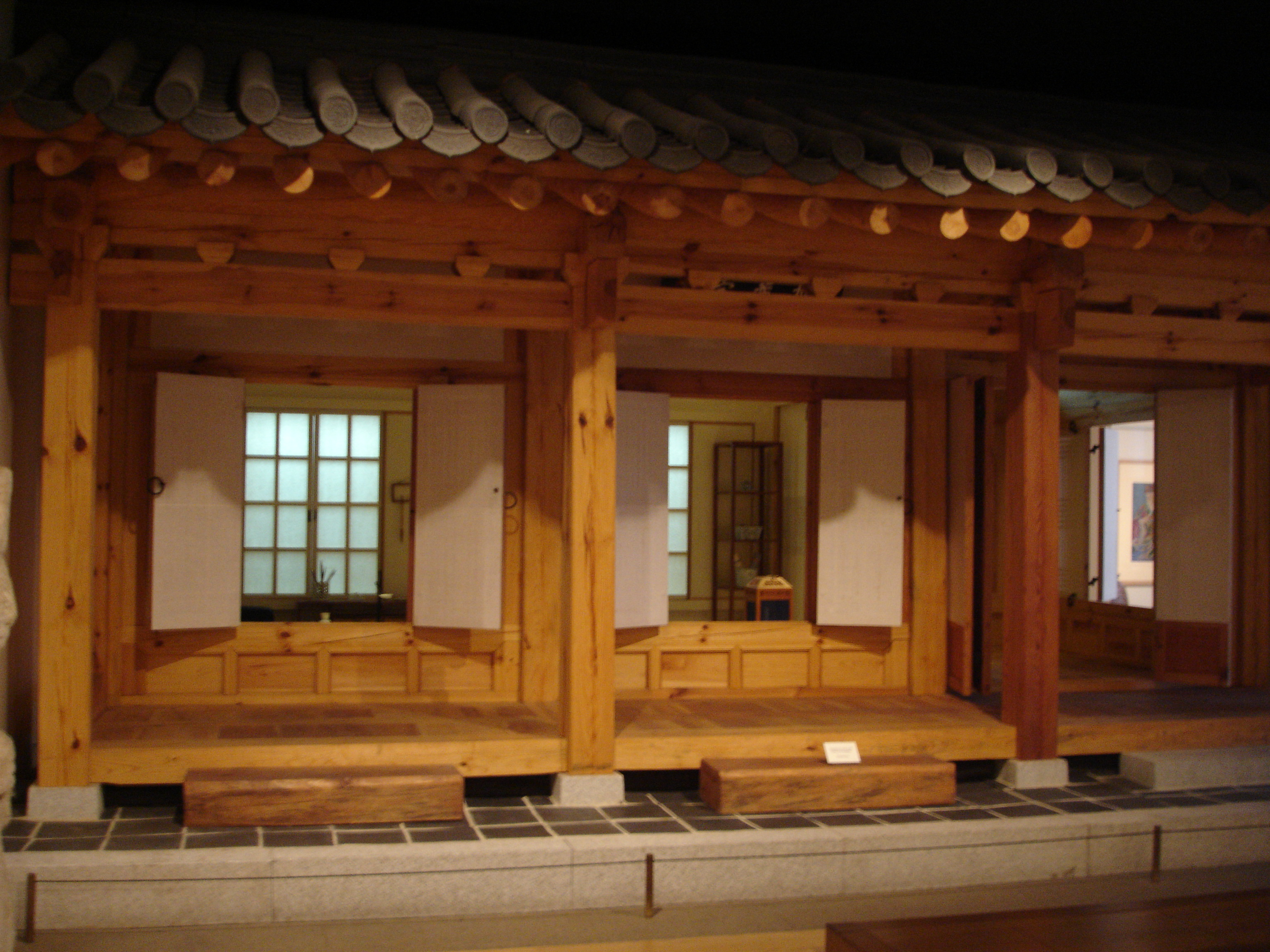
Traditional Korean sarangbang (study room) exterior

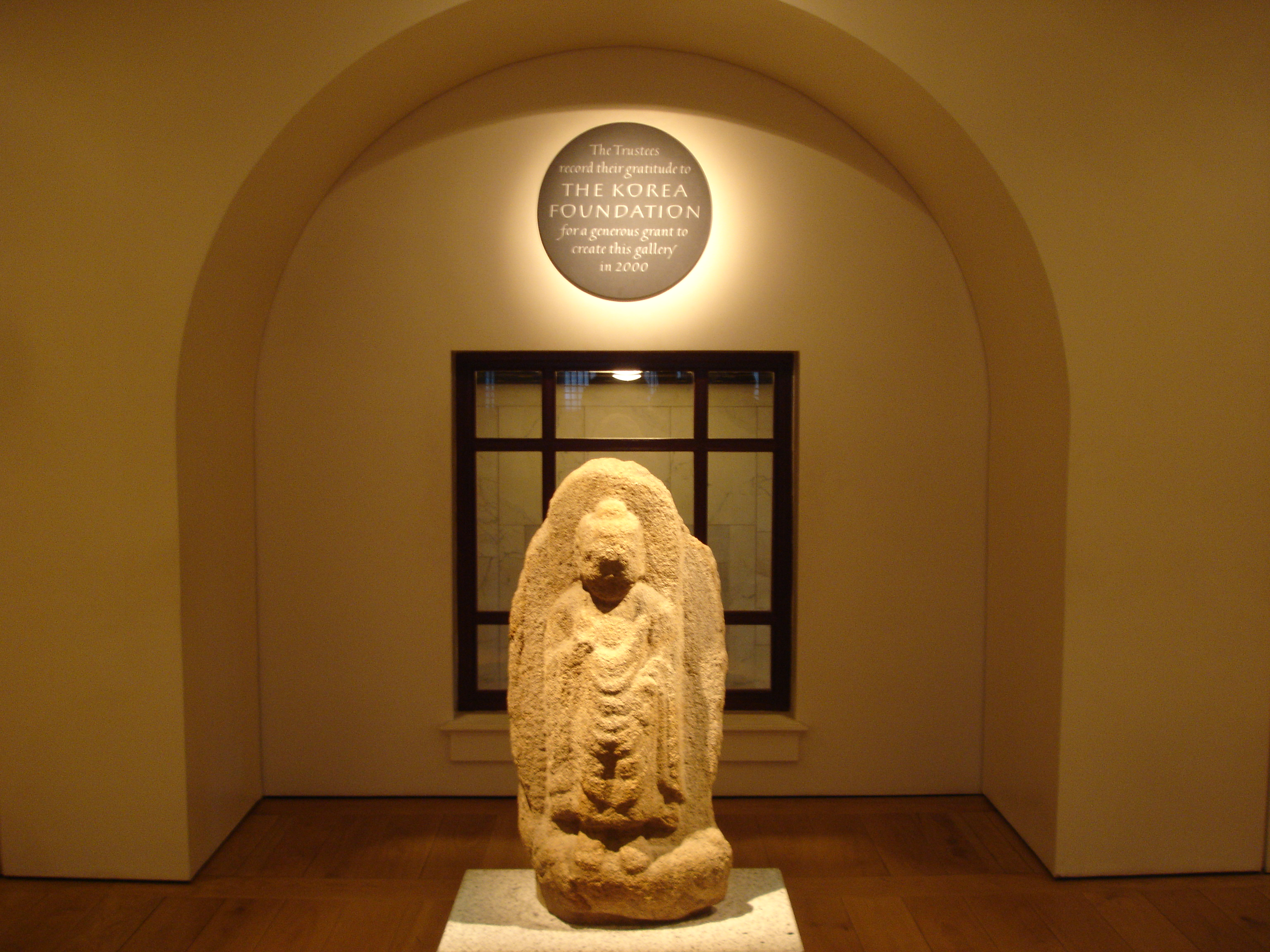
Korean Gallery

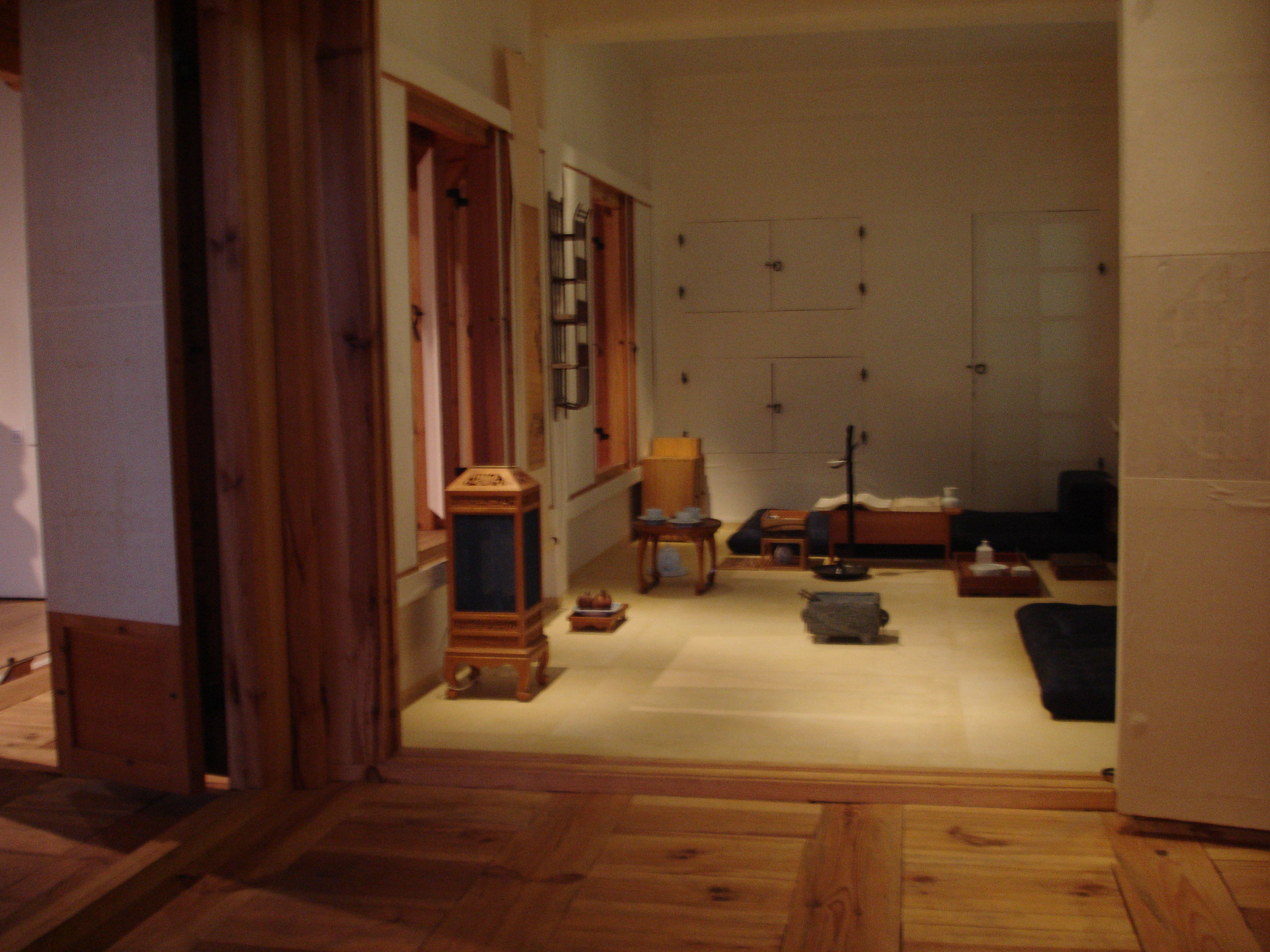
Traditional Korean sarangbang (study room) interior

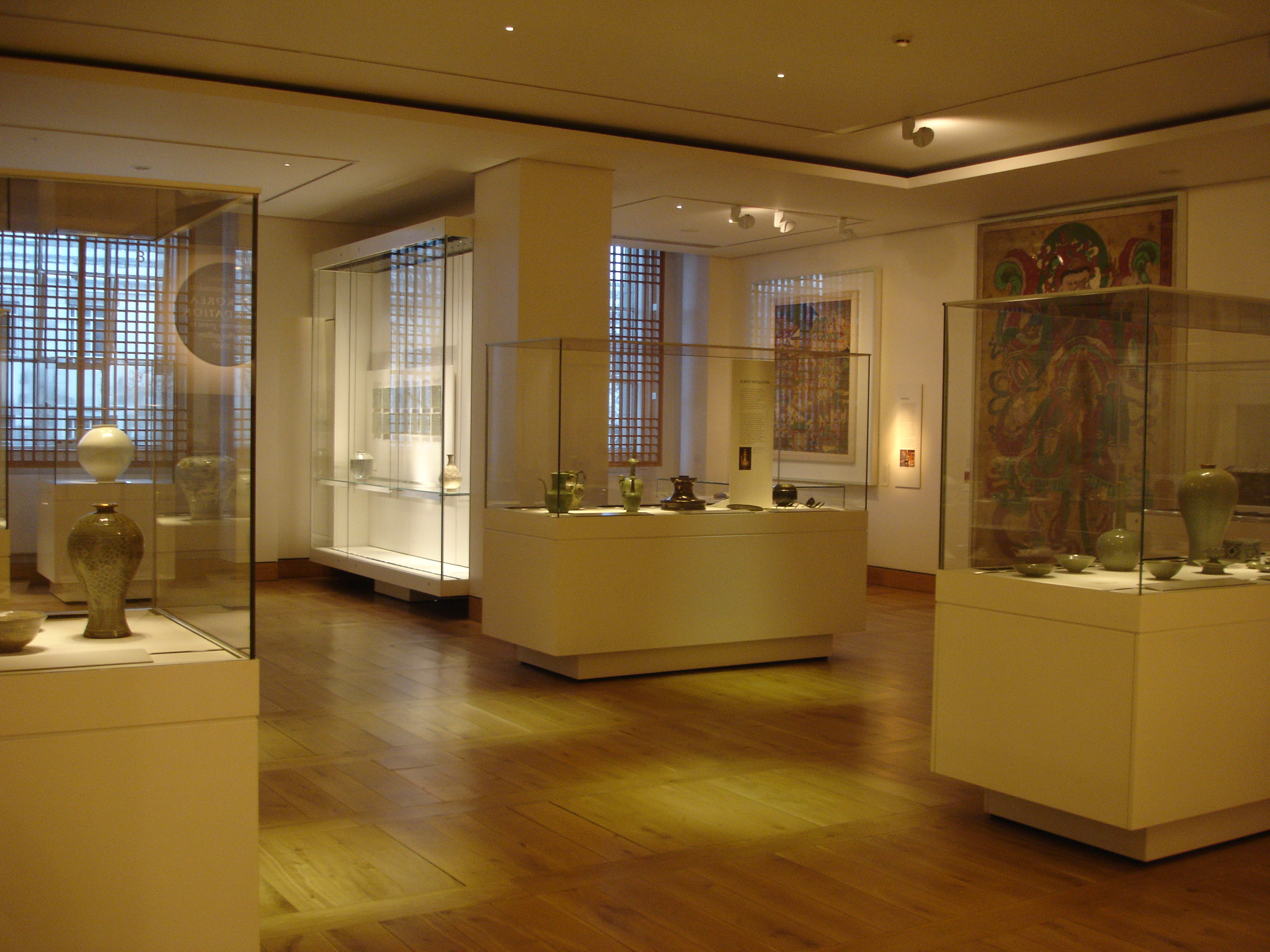
Korean Gallery

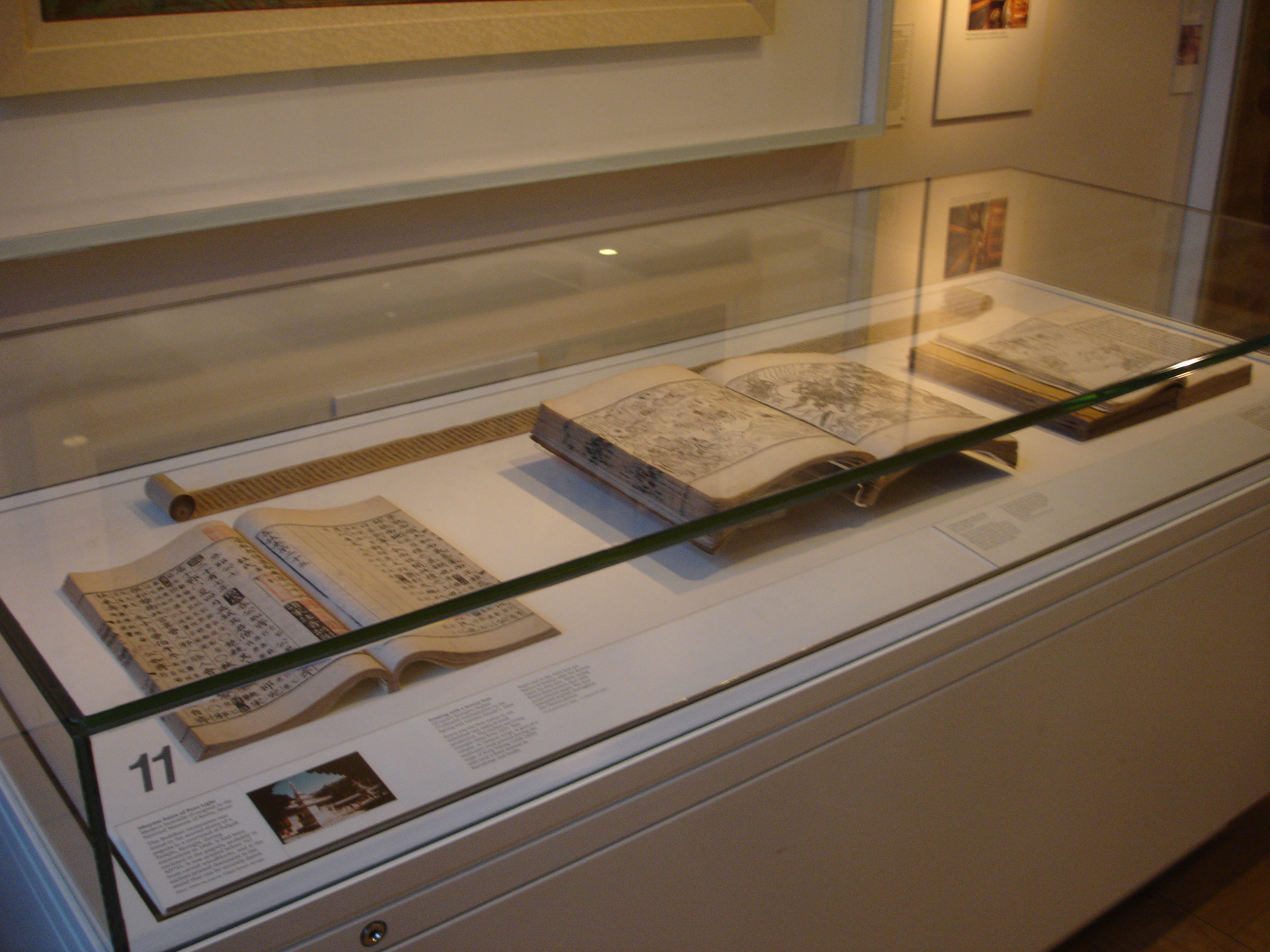
Examples of early Korean script and handwriting
