= Laurence Binyon =

English poet and dramatist (1869–1943)

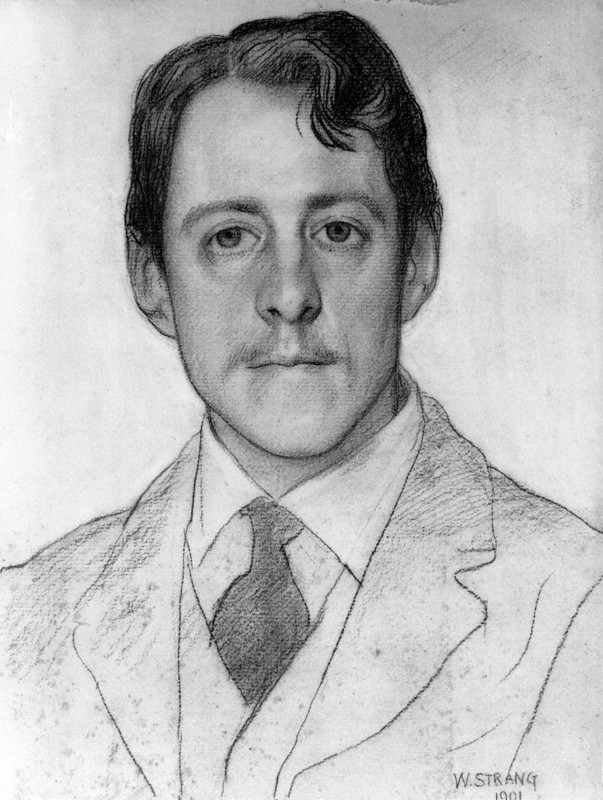
- Drawing of Laurence Binyon by William Strang, 1901
- Born: Robert Laurence Binyon; 10 August 1869; Lancaster, Lancashire, England
- Died: 10 March 1943 (aged 73); Reading, Berkshire, England
- Occupations: Poet, dramatist, scholar
- Spouse: Cicely Margaret Powell
- Children: Helen Binyon; Margaret Binyon; Nicolete Gray
- Relatives: T. J. Binyon (great-nephew); Camilla Gray (granddaughter)

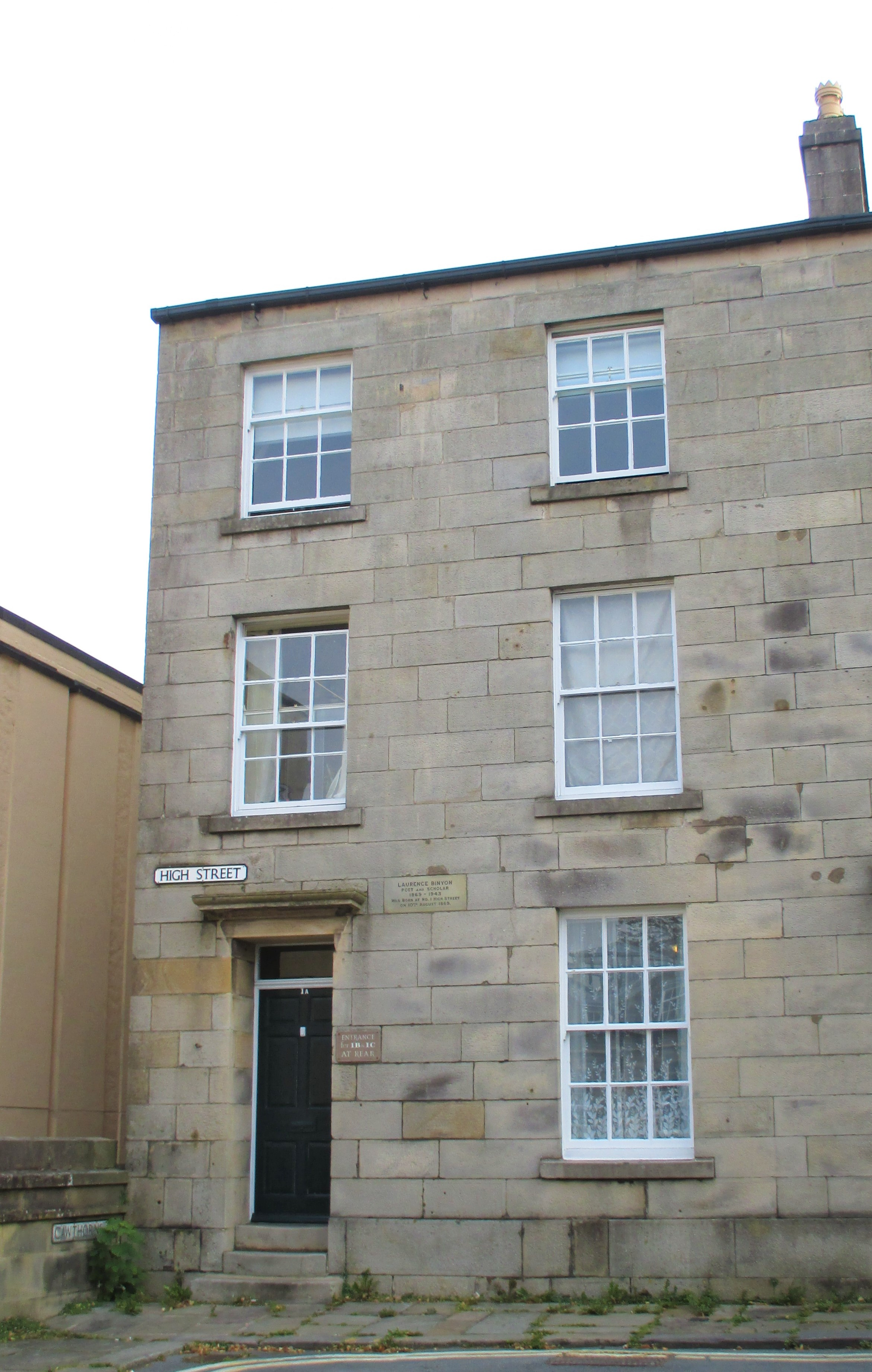
Binyon's birthplace, 1 High Street, Lancaster

Robert Laurence Binyon, CH (10 August 1869 – 10 March 1943) was an English poet, dramatist and art scholar. Born in Lancaster, England, his parents were Frederick Binyon, a clergyman, and Mary Dockray. He studied at St Paul's School, London and at Trinity College, Oxford, where he won the Newdigate Prize for poetry in 1891. He worked for the British Museum from 1893 until his retirement in 1933. In 1904 he married the historian Cicely Margaret Powell, with whom he had three daughters, including the artist Nicolete Gray.

Moved by the casualties of the British Expeditionary Force in 1914, Binyon wrote his most famous work "For the Fallen", which is often recited at Remembrance Sunday services in the UK, Australia, New Zealand, Canada, and South Africa. In 1915, he volunteered as a hospital orderly in France and afterwards worked in England, helping to take care of the wounded of the Battle of Verdun. He wrote about these experiences in For Dauntless France, re-released as a centenary edition in 2018 as The Call and the Answer. After the war, he continued his career at the British Museum, writing numerous books on art.

He was appointed Norton Professor of Poetry at Harvard University in 1933. Between 1933 and his death in 1943, he published his translation of Dante's Divine Comedy. His war poetry includes a poem about the London Blitz, "The Burning of the Leaves", regarded by many as his masterpiece.

== Early life ==
Laurence Binyon was born in Lancaster, Lancashire, England. His parents were Frederick Binyon, a clergyman of the Church of England, and Mary Dockray. Mary's father, Robert Benson Dockray, was a main engineer of the London and Birmingham Railway. His forebears were Quakers.

Binyon studied at St Paul's School, London. Then he read Classics (Honour Moderations) at Trinity College, Oxford, where he won the Newdigate Prize for poetry in 1891.

Immediately after graduating in 1893, Binyon started working for the Department of Printed Books of the British Museum, writing catalogues for the museum and art monographs for himself. In 1895 his first book, Dutch Etchers of the Seventeenth Century, was published. In that same year, Binyon moved into the museum's Department of Prints and Drawings, under Campbell Dodgson. In 1909, Binyon became its Assistant Keeper.

1913, he was made the Keeper of the new Sub-Department of Oriental Prints and Drawings. Around then, he played a crucial role in the formation of Modernism in London by introducing young Imagist poets such as Ezra Pound, Richard Aldington and H.D. to East Asian visual art and literature. Many of Binyon's books produced at the museum were influenced by his own sensibilities as a poet although some were works of plain scholarship, such as his four-volume catalogue of all of the museum's English drawings and his seminal catalogue of Chinese and Japanese prints.

In 1904 he married historian Cicely Margaret Powell, and the couple had three daughters. During those years, Binyon belonged to a circle of artists, as a regular patron of the Vienna Café in Oxford Street. His fellow intellectuals there were Ezra Pound, Sir William Rothenstein, Walter Sickert, Charles Ricketts, Lucien Pissarro and Edmund Dulac.

Binyon's reputation before the First World War was such that on the death of the Poet Laureate Alfred Austin in 1913, Binyon was among the names mentioned in the press as his likely successor. Others named included Thomas Hardy, John Masefield and Rudyard Kipling, with the post going to Robert Bridges.

== "For the Fallen" ==
Moved by the opening of what was then called the Great War and the already-high number of casualties of the British Expeditionary Force, Binyon wrote his "For the Fallen" in 1914, with its "Ode of Remembrance", the third and fourth, or simply the fourth stanza of the poem. At the time, he was visiting the cliffs on the north Cornwall coast, either at Polzeath or at Portreath. There is a plaque at each site to commemorate the event, but Binyon himself mentioned Polzeath in a 1939 interview. The confusion may be related to Porteath Farm being near Polzeath. The piece was published by The Times in September, when public feeling was affected by the recent Battle of the Marne.

Today Binyon's most famous poem, "For the Fallen", is often recited at British Remembrance Sunday services; is an integral part of Anzac Day services in Australia and New Zealand and of 11 November Remembrance Day services in Canada. The "Ode of Remembrance" has thus been claimed as a tribute to all casualties of war, regardless of nation.

They went with songs to the battle, they were young.
Straight of limb, true of eyes, steady and aglow.
They were staunch to the end against odds uncounted,
They fell with their faces to the foe.

They shall grow not old, as we that are left grow old:
Age shall not weary them, nor the years condemn.
At the going down of the sun and in the morning,
We will remember them.

They mingle not with their laughing comrades again;
They sit no more at familiar tables of home;
They have no lot in our labour of the day-time;
They sleep beyond England's foam

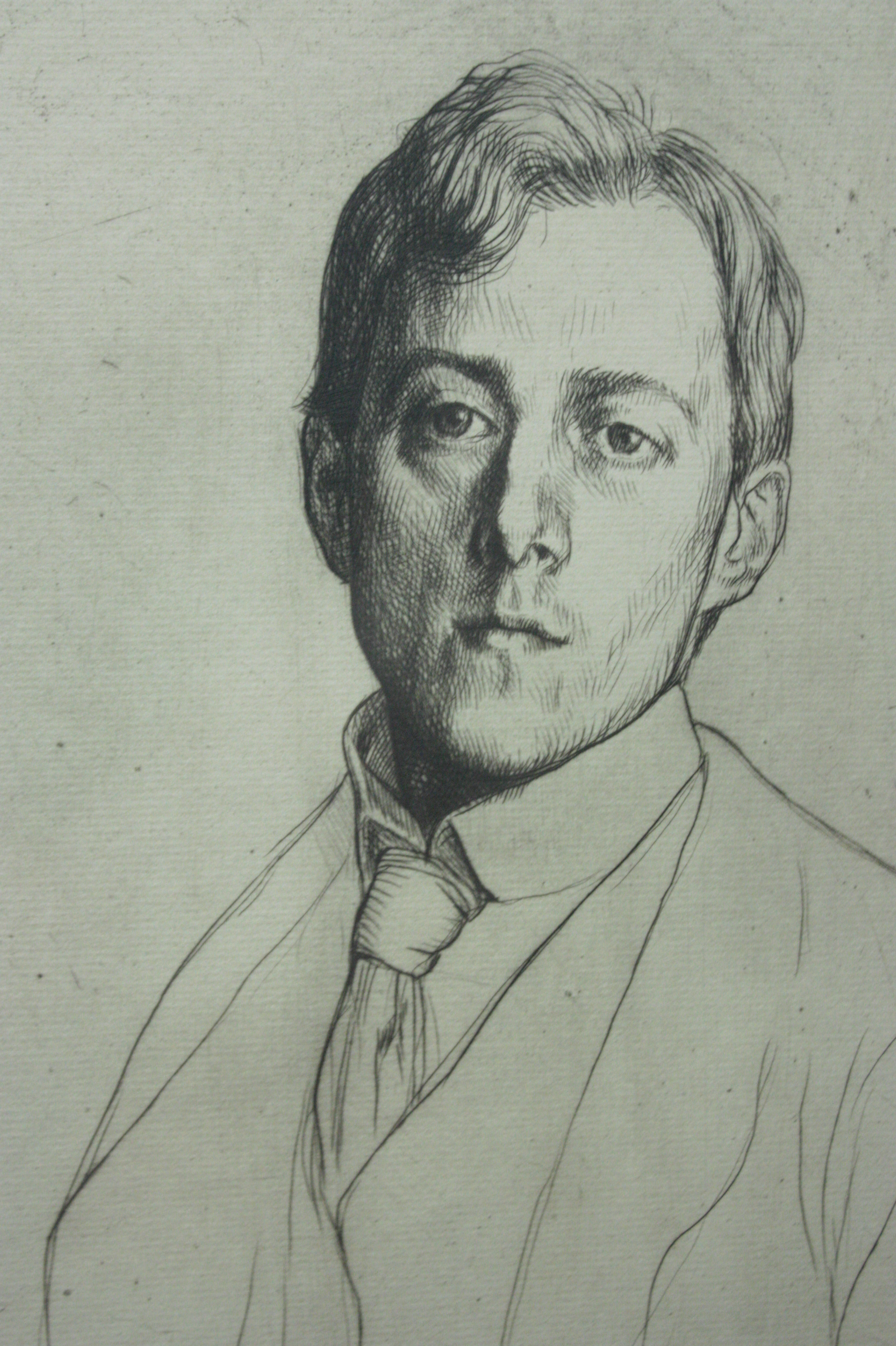
Laurence Binyon, 1898, drypoint by William Strang

This "Ode to Remembrance" comprises the central three stanzas of the seven-stanza poem "For the Fallen", being preceded, and followed, by two additional stanzas. The Ode itself, as used in remembrance services, is more usually only the central stanza of the three shown above. The full poem may be found here.

Three of Binyon's poems, including "For the Fallen", were set by Sir Edward Elgar in his last major orchestra/choral work, The Spirit of England.

In 1915, despite being too old to enlist in the armed forces, Binyon volunteered at a British hospital for French soldiers, Hôpital Temporaire d'Arc-en-Barrois, Haute-Marne, France, working briefly as a hospital orderly. He returned in the summer of 1916 and took care of soldiers taken in from the Verdun battlefield. He wrote about his experiences in For Dauntless France (1918) and his poems, "Fetching the Wounded" and "The Distant Guns", were inspired by his hospital service in Arc-en-Barrois.

Artists Rifles, a CD audiobook published in 2004, includes a reading of "For the Fallen" by Binyon himself. The recording itself is undated and appeared on a 78 rpm disc issued in Japan. Other Great War poets heard on the CD include Siegfried Sassoon, Edmund Blunden, Robert Graves, David Jones and Edgell Rickword.

== Later life ==
After the war, he returned to the British Museum and wrote numerous books on art, in particular on William Blake, Persian art, and Japanese art. His work on ancient Japanese and Chinese cultures offered strongly-contextualised examples that inspired, among others, the poets Ezra Pound and W. B. Yeats. Binyon's work on Blake and his followers kept alive the then nearly-forgotten memory of the work of Samuel Palmer. Binyon's duality of interests continued the traditional interest of British visionary Romanticism in the rich strangeness of Mediterranean and Oriental cultures.

In 1931, his two-volume Collected Poems appeared. In 1932, Binyon rose to be the Keeper of the Prints and Drawings Department, but in 1933, he retired from the British Museum. He went to live in the country at Westridge Green, near Streatley, Berkshire, where his daughters also came to live during the Second World War, and he continued to write poetry.

In 1933–1934, Binyon was appointed Norton Professor of Poetry at Harvard University. He delivered a series of lectures on The Spirit of Man in Asian Art, which were published in 1935. Binyon continued his academic work. In May 1939, he gave the prestigious Romanes Lecture in Oxford on Art and Freedom, and in 1940, he was appointed the Byron Professor of English Literature at University of Athens. He worked there until he was forced to leave, narrowly escaping the German invasion of Greece in April 1941. He was succeeded by Lord Dunsany, who held the chair in 1940–1941.

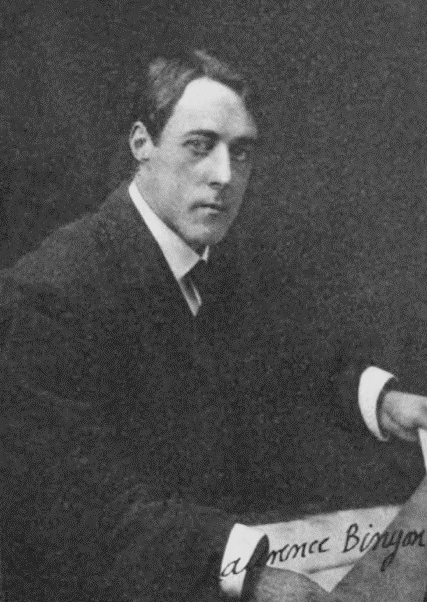
Laurence Binyon

Binyon had been friends with Pound since around 1909, and in the 1930s, the two became especially close; Pound affectionately called him "BinBin" and assisted Binyon with his translation of Dante. Another protégé was Arthur Waley, whom Binyon employed at the British Museum.

Between 1933 and 1943, Binyon published his acclaimed translation of Dante's Divine Comedy in an English version of terza rima, made with some editorial assistance from Ezra Pound. He dedicated twenty years to his translation and finished it shortly before his death. Its readership was dramatically increased when Paolo Milano selected it for "The Portable Dante" in Viking's Portable Library series. Binyon significantly revised his translation of all three parts for the project, and the volume went through three major editions and eight printings, while other volumes in the same series went out of print, before it was replaced by the Mark Musa translation in 1981.

During the Second World War, Binyon continued to write poetry including a long poem about the London Blitz, "The Burning of the Leaves", which is regarded by many as his masterpiece. In 2016, Paul O'Prey edited a new selection of his poems, Poems of Two Wars, which brought together the poems written during both wars, with an introductory essay on Binyon's work that makes the case for his later poetry to be considered as his best.

At his death, Binyon was working on a major three-part Arthurian trilogy, the first part of which was published after his death as The Madness of Merlin (1947).

He died in Dunedin Nursing Home, Bath Road, Reading, on 10 March 1943, aged 73, after an operation. A funeral service was held at Trinity College Chapel, Oxford, on 13 March 1943.

There is a slate memorial in St Mary's Church, in Aldworth, Berkshire, where Binyon's ashes were scattered. On 11 November 1985, Binyon was among 16 Great War poets commemorated on a slate stone unveiled in Westminster Abbey's Poets' Corner. The inscription on the stone was taken from Wilfred Owen's "Preface" to his poems and reads: "My subject is War, and the pity of War. The Poetry is in the pity".

== Family ==
His three daughters Helen, Margaret and Nicolete became artists. Helen Binyon (1904–1979) studied with Paul Nash and Eric Ravilious, illustrating many books for the Oxford University Press, and was also a marionettist. She later taught puppetry and published Puppetry Today (1966) and Professional Puppetry in England (1973). Margaret Binyon wrote children's books, which were illustrated by Helen. Nicolete, as Nicolete Gray, was a distinguished calligrapher and art scholar.

== Selected bibliography ==
=== Poems and verse ===
- Lyric Poems (1894)
- Porphyrion and other Poems (1898)
- Odes (1901)
- Death of Adam and Other Poems (1904)
- London Visions (1908)
- England and Other Poems (1909)
- "For The Fallen", The Times, 21 September 1914
- Winnowing Fan (1914)
- Ypres
- The Anvil (1916)
- The Cause (1917)
- The New World: Poems (1918)
- The Idols (1928)
- Collected Poems Vol 1: London Visions, Narrative Poems, Translations. (1931)
- Collected Poems Vol 2: Lyrical Poems. (1931)
- The North Star and Other Poems (1941)
- The Burning of the Leaves and Other Poems (1944)
- The Madness of Merlin (1947)
- Poems of Two Wars (2016)

In 1915 Cyril Rootham set "For the Fallen" for chorus and orchestra, first performed in 1919 by the Cambridge University Musical Society conducted by the composer. Edward Elgar set to music three of Binyon's poems ("The Fourth of August", "To Women", and "For the Fallen", published within the collection "The Winnowing Fan") as The Spirit of England, Op. 80, for tenor or soprano solo, chorus and orchestra (1917).

=== English arts and myth ===
- Dutch Etchers of the Seventeenth Century (1895), Binyon's first book on painting
- John Crome and John Sell Cotman (1897)
- William Blake: Being all his Woodcuts Photographically Reproduced in Facsimile (1902)
- English Poetry in its relation to painting and the other arts (1918)
- Drawings and Engravings of William Blake (1922)
- Arthur: A Tragedy (1923)
- The Followers of William Blake (1925)
- The Engraved Designs of William Blake (1926)
- Landscape in English Art and Poetry (1931)
- English Water-colours (1933)
- Gerard Hopkins and his influence (1939)
- Art and freedom. (The Romanes lecture, delivered 25 May 1939). Oxford: The Clarendon press, (1939)

=== Chinese, Japanese and Persian arts ===
- Painting in the Far East (1908)
- Japanese Art (1909)
- Flight of the Dragon (1911)
- The Court Painters of the Grand Moguls (1921)
- Japanese Colour Prints (1923)
- The Poems of Nizami (1928) (Translation)
- Persian Miniature Painting (1933)
- The Spirit of Man in Asian Art (1936)

=== Autobiography ===
- For Dauntless France (1918) (War memoir)

=== Biography ===
- Botticelli (1913)
- Akbar (1932)

=== Stage plays ===
- Brief Candles A verse-drama about the decision of Richard III to dispatch his two nephews
- "Paris and Oenone", 1906
- Godstow Nunnery: Play
- Boadicea; A Play in eight Scenes
- Attila: a Tragedy in Four Acts
- Ayuli: a Play in three Acts and an Epilogue
- Sophro the Wise: a Play for Children

(Most of the above were written for John Masefield's theatre).

Charles Villiers Stanford wrote incidental music for Attila in 1907.
