= Helen Binyon =

British artist and author (1904-1979)

- Born: 9 December 1904; Chelsea, London, England
- Died: 22 November 1979 (aged 74); Chichester, England
- Known for: Watercolour painting, illustration, puppetry

Helen Francesca Mary Binyon (9 December 1904 – 22 November 1979) was a British artist and writer. She was also a watercolour painter, an illustrator and a puppeteer.

== Biography ==
Binyon was born in Chelsea in London, her father being the poet and scholar Laurence Binyon, and was educated at St Paul's Girls' School. Helen Binyon studied at the Royal College of Art, RCA, between 1922 and 1926 where she was taught by Paul Nash and her fellow pupils included Edward Bawden and Eric Ravilious. After spending some time at the Académie de la Grande Chaumière in Paris, Binyon studied engraving at the Central School of Arts and Crafts from 1928 to 1930. Shortly afterwards she had a joint exhibition, with Bawden and Ravilious, at the Redfern Gallery in London. Throughout her life, Binyon remained close to her RCA peer group.

Between 1931 and 1938, Binyon taught part-time at the Eastbourne College of Art and also at the North London Collegiate School. With her twin sister, Margaret, Binyon established a travelling puppet theatre, Jiminy Puppets. During 1938, the sisters performed a one-act play, Old Spain, twice-nightly at a theatre in Notting Hill in London. The play was accompanied with music by Lennox Berkeley, a verse libretto by Montagu Slater and had Benjamin Britten playing the piano score. Also during 1938, Binyon worked for Robert Gibbings producing illustrations for the Penguin Illustrated Classics series, including an edition of Pride and Prejudice.

During World War II, Binyon worked for the Admiralty drawing hydrographic charts. Later in the conflict she worked on the preparation of photographic exhibitions for the Ministry of Information and also served in the ambulance service. After the War, Binyon taught at the Willesden School of Art and then at the Bath Academy of Art from 1949 to 1965. A solo show of her watercolours was held at the Grafton Gallery in 1979. Binyon's interest in puppetry continued throughout her life and she wrote two books on the subject, including a 1971 survey of professional puppetry commissioned by the Arts Council. She also wrote the first published volume on Ravilious and illustrated several other books, including her fathers' play Brief Candles and a series of books written by her sister Margaret Binyon. Her children's book illustrations were often in pen and ink but she also produced wood engravings for her other book work. She was a member of the Society of Wood Engravers.

== Published works ==
- Angeline or L'Amie Inconnne (1933, Swan Press) by M.Edgeworth, illustrated by Helen Binyon
- Sophro the Wise. A play for children by Laurence Binyon with Margaret and Helen Binyon (1927, Ernest Benn)
- Brief Candles, a play by Laurence Binyon, with engravings by Helen Binyon
- The Birthday party (1940, Oxford University Press, OUP) with Margaret Binyon
- Polly and Jane (1940, OUP) with Margaret Binyon
- A Country Visit (1940, OUP) with Margaret Binyon
- A Day at the Sea (1940, OUP) with Margaret Binyon
- Christmas Eve, A tale of Children (1942, OUP)
- The Picnic (1944, OUP)
- Polly Goes to School (1944, OUP)
- Polly and Jane's House (1949, OUP)
- The Railway Journey (1949, OUP)
- The Children Next Door (1949, Aladdin Books)
- An Everyday Alphabet (1952, OUP)
- Puppetry Today (1966)
- Professional Puppetry in England (1973)
- Eric Raviliouis - Memoir of an Artist (1983, Lutterworth Press)
