= 1829 in art =

Events in the year 1829 in Art.

== Events ==
- 4 May – The Royal Academy Exhibition of 1829 opens at Somerset House in London
- November – Thomas Hornor's Panoramic view of London, the largest panoramic painting ever created, is completed in the London Colosseum, purpose-designed by Decimus Burton in Regent's Park.
- December – The final issue of The Yankee magazine by art critic John Neal is published.
- Jean-Hippolyte Flandrin and his brother Jean Paul Flandrin set out to walk to Paris from Lyons, in order to become pupils of Louis Hersent.

== Works ==
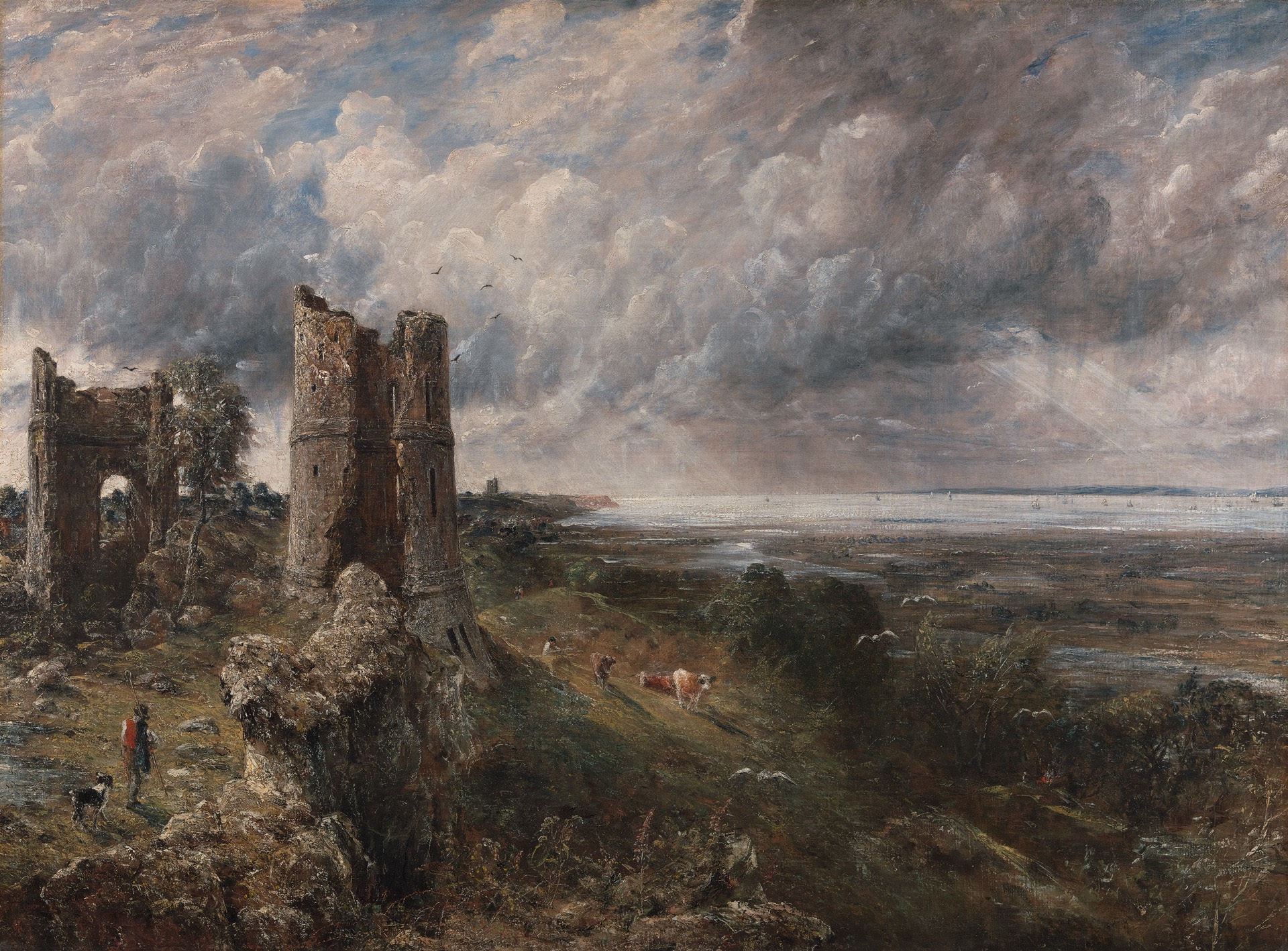
Constable – Hadleigh Castle

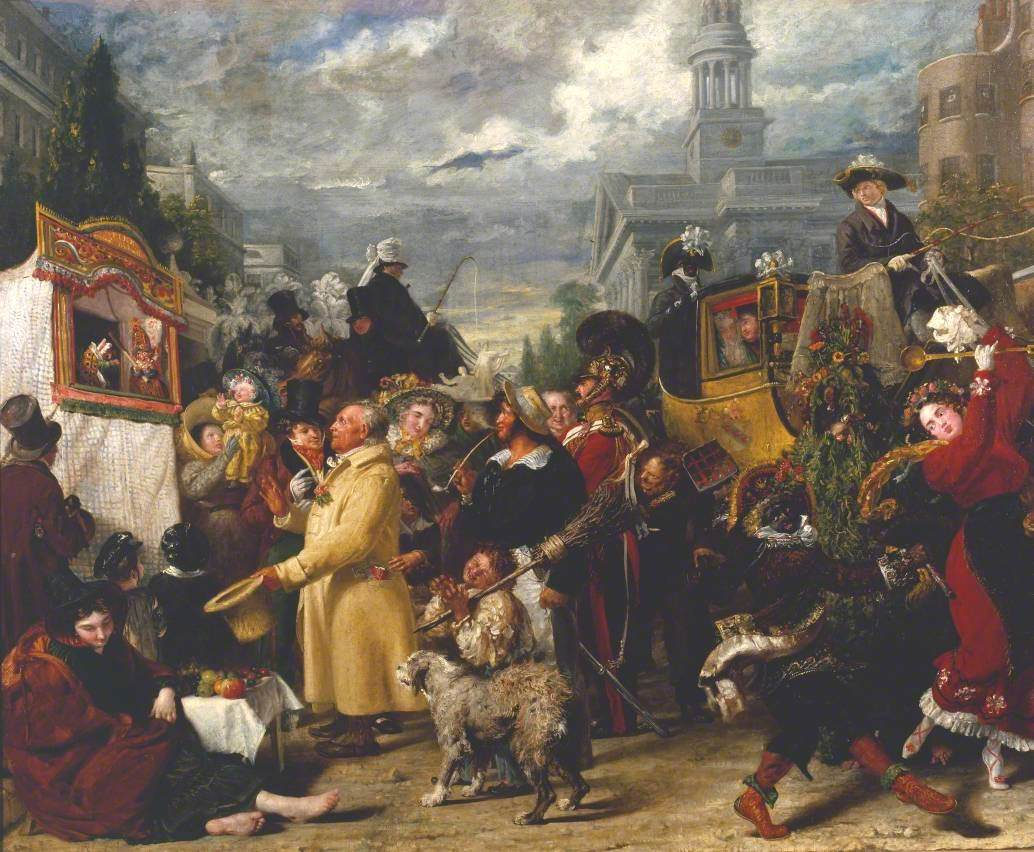
Haydon – Punch or May Day

Nelson Boarding the San Josef by George Jones.

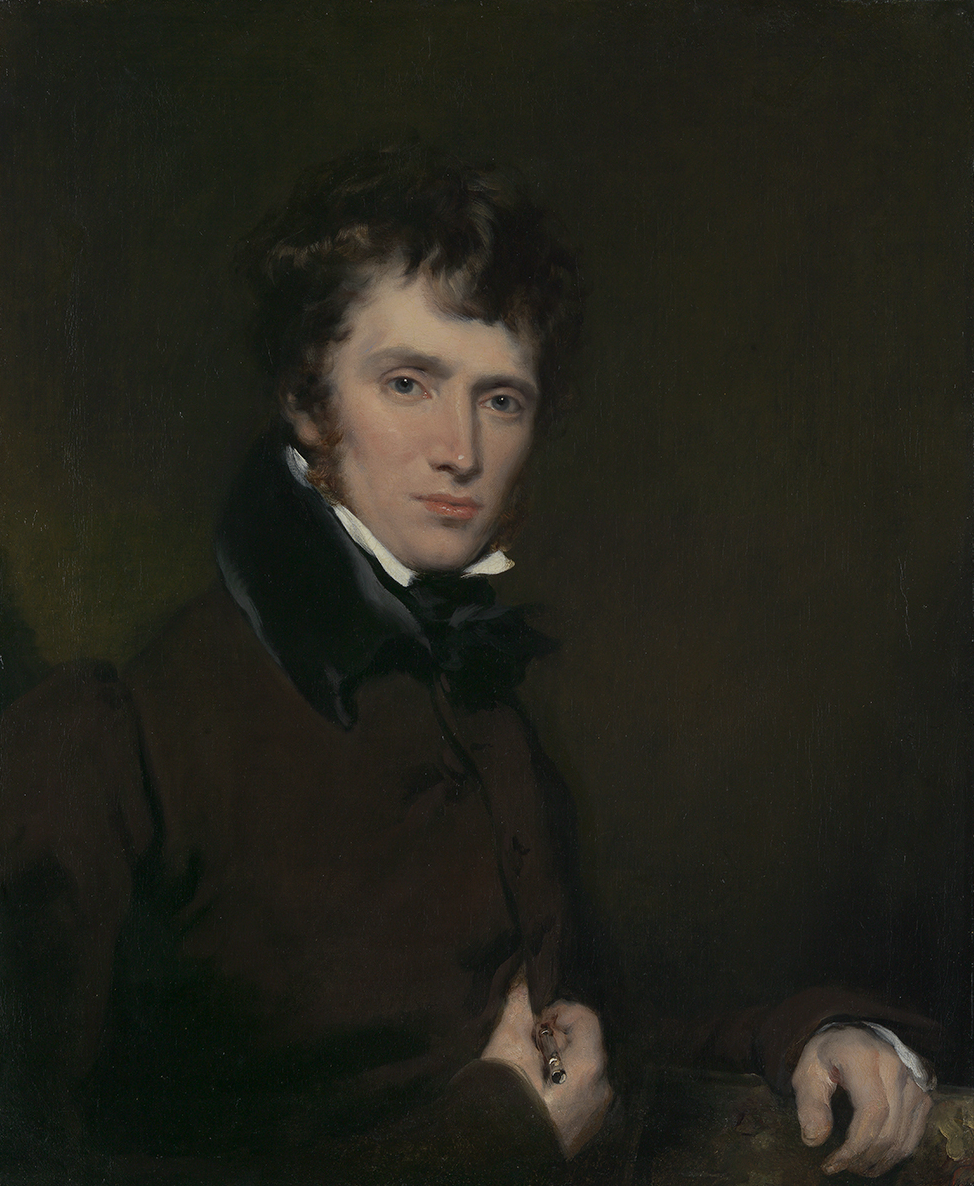
Portrait of Clarkson Stanfield by John Simpson.

=== Paintings ===
- Giuseppe Bezzuoli – The Entrance of Charles VIII into Florence
- John Constable – Hadleigh Castle
- Paul Delaroche – The State Barge of Cardinal Richelieu on the Rhône
- Christoffer Wilhelm Eckersberg – A View towards the Swedish Coast from the Ramparts of Kronborg Castle
- William Etty
  - Benaiah
  - Hero and Leander
- Benjamin Robert Haydon – Punch or May Day
- William Heath – Burking Poor Old Mrs Constitution
- George Jones
  - The Battle of Borodino
  - Nelson Boarding the San Josef
- Christen Købke – View of Århus Cathedral
- Cornelis Kruseman – Portrait of Johannes van den Bosch
- Eugène Lami – Charles I Receiving a Rose
- Edwin Henry Landseer
  - Attachment
  - Highland Music
  - Low Life and High Life
  - The Illicit Highland Whisky Still
- Thomas Lawrence
  - Portrait of the Countess of Wilton
  - Portrait of Maria II
  - Portrait of Jeffry Wyatville
  - Portrait of John Soane
  - Unfinished Wellington
- Bernardo López Piquer – Maria Isabel of Braganza
- David Roberts – The Departure of the Israelites
- John Simpson – Portrait of Clarkson Stanfield
- J. M. W. Turner
  - The Banks of the Loire
  - The Loretto Necklace
  - Ulysses Deriding Polyphemus
- David Wilkie – George IV in Highland Dress

=== Sculpture ===
- Francis Chantrey – Bust of John Soane
- John Hogan – The Dead Christ
- Carlo Marochetti – Young Girl Playing with a Dog
- Robert Mills – Washington Monument (Baltimore)

== Births ==
- February 20 – Charles-Auguste Lebourg, French sculptor (died 1906)
- March 1 – Adolf Seel, German painter (died 1907)
- March 5 – Jean-Jacques Henner, French painter (died 1905)
- June 8 – John Everett Millais, English painter (died 1896)
- July 18 – Paul Dubois, French sculptor and painter (died 1905)
- July 25 – Elizabeth Siddal, English Pre-Raphaelite artists' model, painter and poet (died 1862)
- August 19 – Edward Moran, American marine painter (died 1901)
- September 12 – Anselm Feuerbach, German classicist painter (died 1880)
- September 16 – Achille Emperaire, French painter and friend of Paul Cézanne (died 1898)
- November 20 – Albert Fitch Bellows, American landscape painter (died 1883)
- date unknown – John Lewis Brown, French painter (died 1890)

== Deaths ==
- January 6 – Louis Gerverot, French porcelain painter (born 1747)
- February 4 – Pierre Charles Baquoy, French painter and engraver especially of famous historical characters (born 1759)
- March 21 – George Engleheart, English miniaturist (born 1752)
- March 24 – Jean-Jacques Karpff, French painter, designer and miniaturist (born 1770)
- May 24 – Michał Ceptowski, Bavarian-born stucco artist who settled and worked in Poland (born 1765)
- June 25 – Joseph Bergler the Younger, Austrian-born painter and etcher who settled and worked in Bohemia (born 1753)
- July 14 – Joseph Kreutzinger, Austrian portrait painter (born 1757)
- September 22 – Jes Bundsen, Danish architectural and landscape painter and etcher (born 1766)
- September 27 – Pietro Bettelini, Italian engraver (born 1763)
- November 12 – Jean-Baptiste Regnault, French painter (born 1754)
- date unknown
  - Nikolai Ivanovich Argunov, Russian painter and academician of the St. Petersburg Academy of arts (born 1771)
  - Joseph-François Ducq, Flemish historical and portrait painter (born 1763)
  - Joseph Farey, English mechanical engineer and draughtsman (born 1796)
  - Gai Qi, Chinese poet and painter (born 1774)
  - Zhang Yin, Chinese Qing dynasty calligrapher and painter (born 1761)
