= Confessional (disambiguation) =

A confessional is a small, enclosed booth used for confession.

Confessional may also refer to:

- Confessional (television), common interview practice in reality television
- The Confessional (film), a Canadian film from 1994
- The Confessional (album), a 2008 mixtape by Bishop Lamont
- Confessional (TV series), a 1989 ITV drama television series
- Confessional (film), a 2007 Cebuano mockumentary indie film
- Confessional (Bryan Rice album), 2006
- Confessional (Janet Devlin album), 2020
- Confessional Lutheran, Lutheran Christians
- The Confessional (painting), an 1827 oil painting by David Wilkie

== See also ==
- Confessional community
- Confessional poetry
- Confessional state
- Confessional writing
- Confessionalism (disambiguation)
