= Portrait of the Duke of Clarence (Lawrence) =

1827 painting by Thomas Lawrence

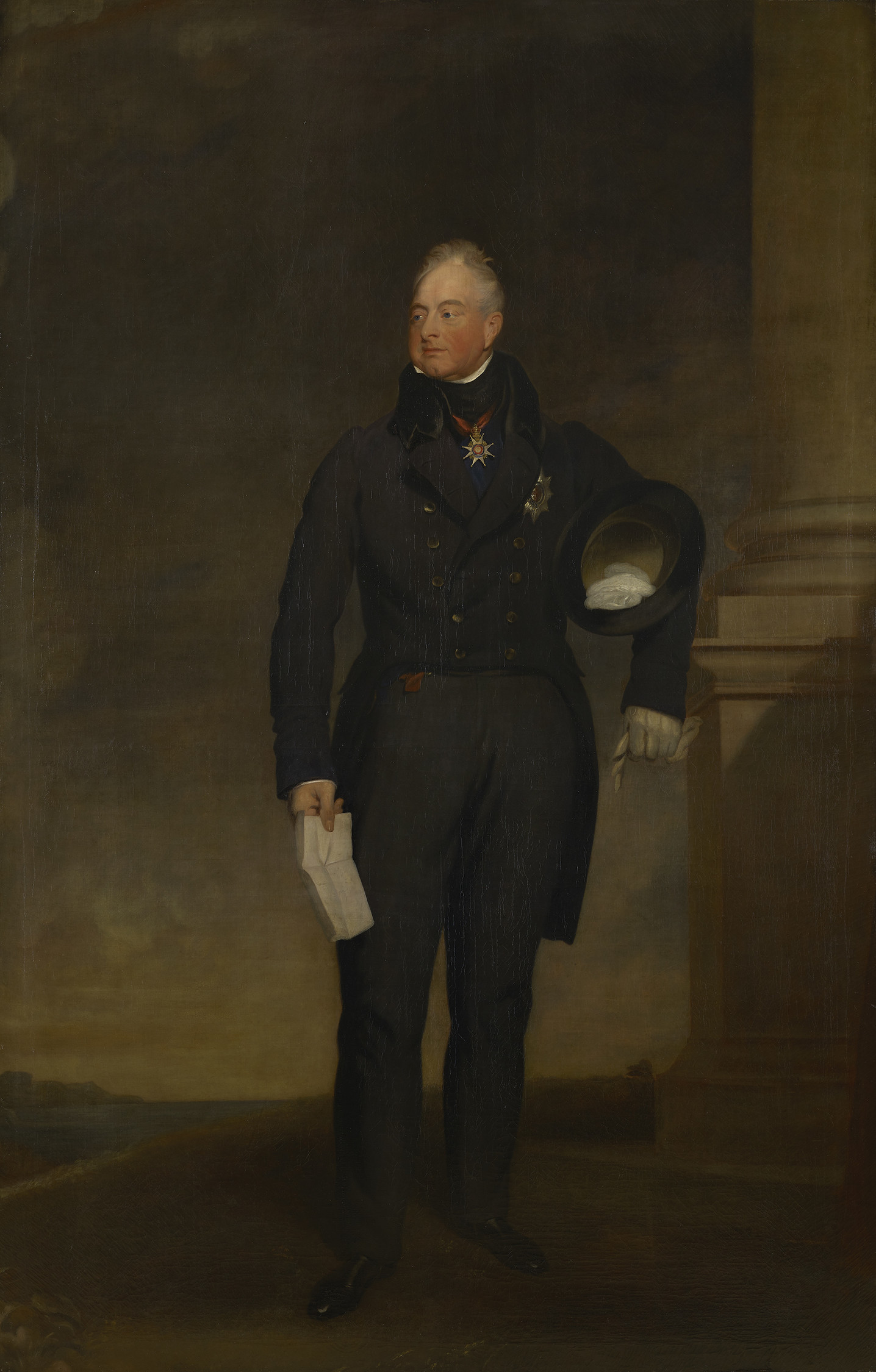
- Artist: Thomas Lawrence
- Year: 1827
- Type: Oil on canvas, portrait painting
- Dimensions: 254.5 cm × 163 cm (100.2 in × 64 in)
- Location: Buckingham Palace, London

Portrait of the Duke of Clarence is an 1827 portrait painting by the British artist Thomas Lawrence. It depicts the future monarch William IV, then Duke of Clarence and heir presumptive to the British throne. It was one of a large number of portraits Lawrence produced featuring members of the House of Hanover.

== History and description ==
Clarence was the third son of George III and served for many years in the Royal Navy. It was painted the same year that Clarence' was appointed Lord High Admiral by the Prime Minister George Canning. In 1830 he succeeded his brother as George IV and reigned for seven years.

Lawrence was the top portrait painter of the Regency era. The painting was commissioned by the Duke for a fee of 600 guineas. He shows the Duke in civilian dress in a dark buttoned-up tailcoat with his top hat under his arm. The more sober appearance of the painting has been interpreted as a deliberate contrast to the flamboyant style of his brother, a major patron of Lawrence who commissioned many of the works in the Waterloo Chamber at Windsor Castle from him.

The painting was displayed at the Royal Academy's Summer Exhibition of 1829 at Somerset House in London. It was still in Lawrence's studio at his death in January 1830. It remains in the Royal Collection and hangs on the Grand Staircase at Buckingham Palace where it was first placed by Queen Victoria in 1846.

== Bibliography ==
- Albinson, Cassandra, Funnell, Peter & Peltz, Lucy. Thomas Lawrence: Regency Power and Brilliance. ISBN 0300167180. Yale University Press, 2010.
- Hamilton, C.I. The Making of the Modern Admiralty: British Naval Policy-Making, 1805–1927. ISBN 0521765188. Cambridge University Press, 2011.
- Levey, Michael. Sir Thomas Lawrence. ISBN 0300109989. Yale University Press, 2005.
