= I Pifferari =

Painting by David Wilkie

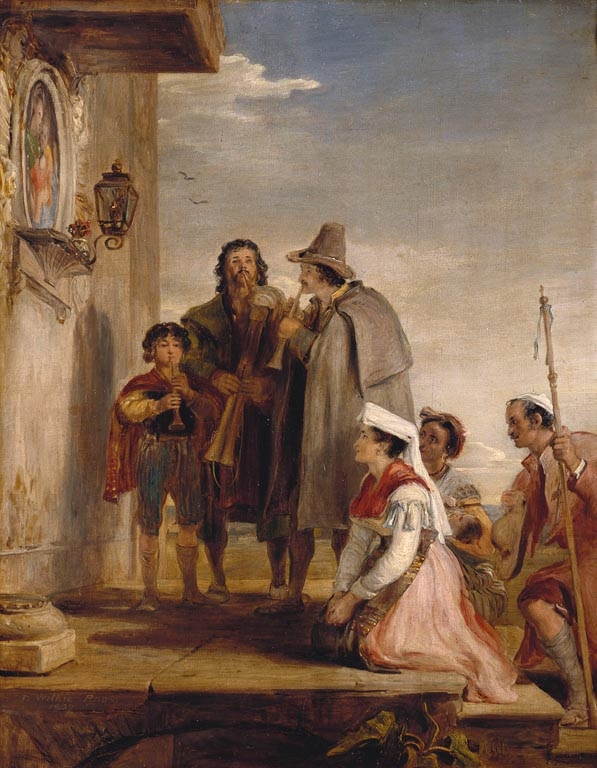
- Artist: David Wilkie
- Year: 1827
- Type: Oil on canvas, genre painting
- Dimensions: 46.1 cm × 36.2 cm (18.1 in × 14.3 in)
- Location: Buckingham Palace, London

I Pifferari (English: The Pipers) is an 1827 genre painting by the British artist David Wilkie. It features a scene in Rome, then the capital of the Papal States. A group of strolling musicians playing bagpipe (zampogna) and two pifferi are shown by pilgrims praying before an image of the Madonna.

Wilkie made his reputation as a leading artist of the Regency era with his series of genre paintings inspired by the Dutch Old Masters of the seventeenth century. He enjoyed particular success with his 1822 work The Chelsea Pensioners reading the Waterloo Dispatch. However after suffering a nervous breakdown and ill health stopped painting and left British for Continental Europe.

Wilkie arrived in Rome in November 1825 largely to try and recover his health but was soon inspired by the events of Holy Year in which a large number of pilgrims had arrived in the city. He also travelled to Spain and produced picturesque scenes of everyday life. Although a Scottish Protestant, Wilkie was moved and inspired by Roman Catholic rituals. This is one of six paintings inspired by the trip acquired by George IV following Wilkie's return in 1828. Both this and its sister painting A Roman Princess Washing the Feet of Pilgrims were acquired for 400 guineas. The work was displayed at the Royal Academy Exhibition of 1829 at Somerset House in London. It remains in the Royal Collection today and hangs in the Carnarvon Room of Buckingham Palace.

== Bibliography ==
- Clarke, Deborah & Remington, Vanessa. Scottish Artists 1750-1900: From Caledonia to the Continent. Royal Collection Trust, 2015.
- Herrmann, Luke. Nineteenth Century British Painting,. Charles de la Mare, 2000.
- Pointon, Marcia R. Brilliant Effects:A Cultural History of Gem Stones and Jewellery. Paul Mellon Centre for Studies in British Art, 2009.
- Tromans, Nicholas. David Wilkie: The People's Painter. Edinburgh University Press, 2007.
