= The Illicit Highland Whisky Still =

Painting by Edwin Landseer

- Artist: Edwin Landseer
- Year: 1829
- Type: Oil on panel, genre painting
- Dimensions: 80 cm × 101.5 cm (31 in × 40.0 in)
- Location: Apsley House, London

The Illicit Highland Whisky Still is an 1829 genre painting by the British artist Edwin Landseer, featuring a scene of life in the Scottish Highlands. Landseer frequently depicted scenes of ordinary life in the Highlands. At a hut a poacher sits on top of the stag he has killed holding a glass of whisky produced at a still. Both poaching and illegal distilling were rife in the area at the time. Although picturesque it is also shown as a moral tale, with the two innocent children exposed to the depravity of the setting.

The painting was commissioned by the Duke of Wellington, Landseer having been recommended by Walter Scott. The subject was agreed between them in 1826, but the work was only completed three years later by which time Wellington was Prime Minister. It was displayed at the Royal Academy Exhibition of 1829 at Somerset House, where it was praised by both The Examiner and The Times. One reviewer noted that placing the still itself in the dark interior reduced the dramatic element. The painting is in the collection of Aspley House in London, the historic residence of the Duke of Wellington. An engraving was produced.

== Bibliography ==
- Jervis, Simon & Tomlin, Maurice. Apsley House, Wellington Museum. Victoria and Albert Museum, 1997.
- Ormond, Richard. Sir Edwin Landseer. Philadelphia Museum of Art, 1981.
