= The Spanish Posada =

Painting by David Wilkie

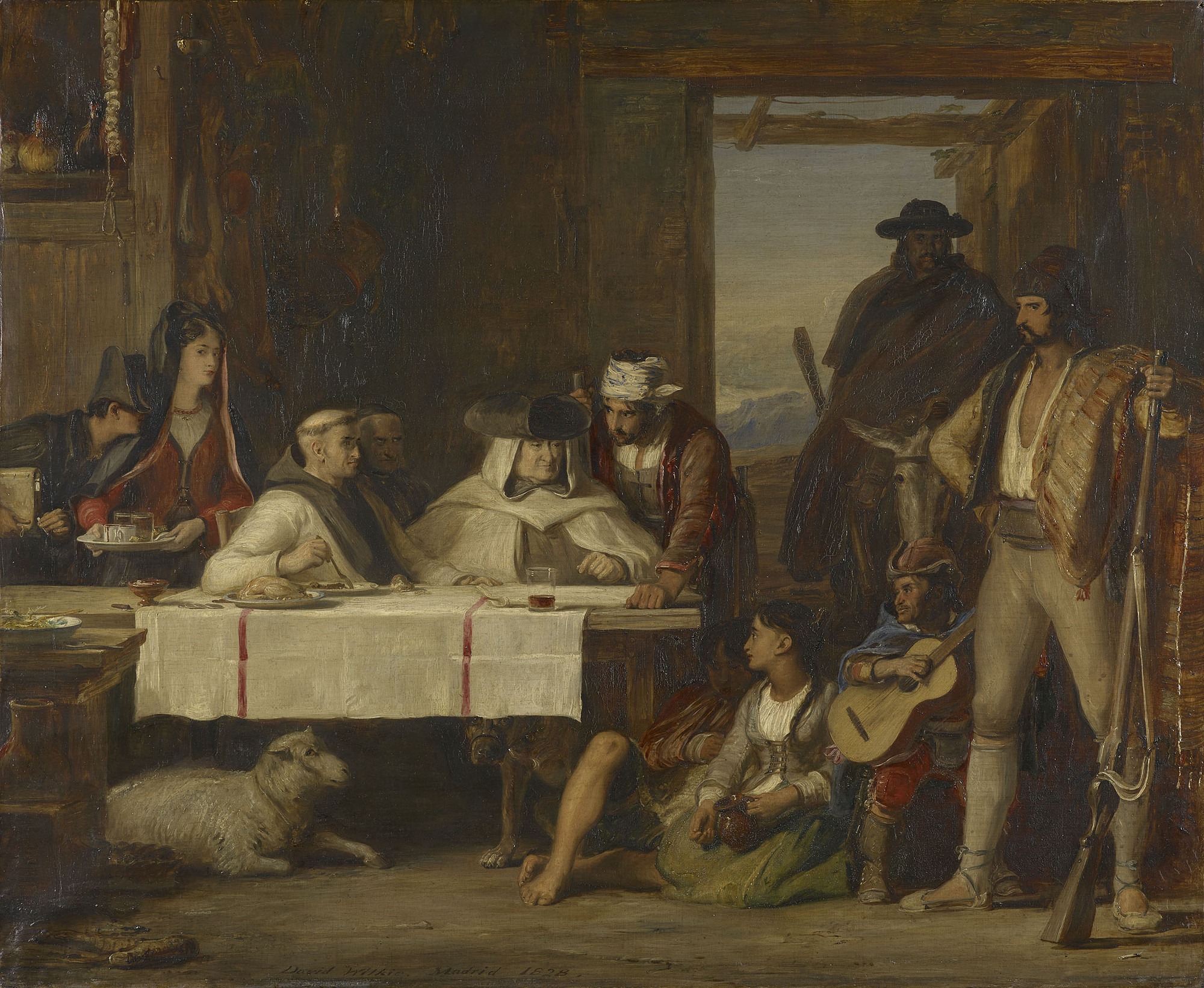
- Artist: David Wilkie
- Year: 1828
- Type: Oil on canvas, history painting
- Dimensions: 76.2 cm × 93.5 cm (30.0 in × 36.8 in)
- Location: Royal Collection

The Spanish Posada: A Guerilla Council of War is an 1828 history painting by the British artist David Wilkie. It depicts a scene from the Peninsular War when Spanish guerrillas fought alongside British, Portuguese and Spanish regular troops to drive out the invading French Empire. In a mountain-top inn (Posada), a council of war is being held by two partisan leaders and three Catholic churchmen. More comic elements are added by a smuggler riding in on a donkey and on the left a young man whispering endearments to the serving woman.

A leading painter of the Regency era, the Scottish Wilkie went on an extended tour across Continental Europe in the mid-1820s including to Italy and Spain. This was one of a series of three paintings produced by Wilkie depicting scenes from the Peninsular War including The Defence of Saragossa that he displayed at the Royal Academy Exhibition of 1829 at Somerset House. George IV purchased them all and commissioned a fourth The Guerilla's Return. They marked a change in Wilkie's style, he had previously taken the genre paintings of Teniers as his model, but now drew inspiration from the oil sketches of Rubens. The original painting remains in the Royal Collection today. Joseph Nash created a lithograph based on the work.

== Bibliography ==
- Baker, Christopher, Howarth, David & Stirton, Paul. The Discovery of Spain: British Artists and Collectors: Goya to Picasso. National Galleries of Scotland, 2009.
- Clarke, Deborah & Remington, Vanessa. Scottish Artists 1750-1900: From Caledonia to the Continent. Royal Collection Trust, 2015.
- Tromans, Nicholas. David Wilkie: The People's Painter. Edinburgh University Press, 2007.
