= Travellers in a Storm, Approach to Winchester =

Painting by Copley Fielding

- Artist: Copley Fielding
- Year: 1829
- Type: Oil on canvas, genre painting
- Dimensions: 101.5 cm × 126.9 cm (40.0 in × 50.0 in)
- Location: Royal Holloway College, Surrey

Travellers in a Storm, Approach to Winchester is an 1829 landscape painting by the British artist Copley Fielding. Romantic it depicts a group ot travellers making their way through the countryside towards Winchester during a thunderstorm. The skyline of the city with its noted cathedral looms on the horizon. Copley was best known for his watercolours and this was one of only seventeen oil paintings he produced.

The painting was displayed at the Royal Academy Exhibition of 1829 at Somerset House in London when a critic noted it "nearly approaches the sublime". It was acquired in 1881 by the art collector and philanthropist Thomas Holloway for the large sum of £3,150. He subsequently presented it to Royal Holloway College.

== Bibliography ==
- Chapel, Jeannie. Victorian Taste: The Complete Catalogue of Paintings at the Royal Holloway College. A. Zwemmer, 1982
- Cowling, Mary (ed.) Paintings From the Reign of Queen Victoria: The Royal Holloway Collection, London. Art Services International, 2008.
