= The Banks of the Loire =

Painting by J. M. W. Turner

- The Banks of the Loire
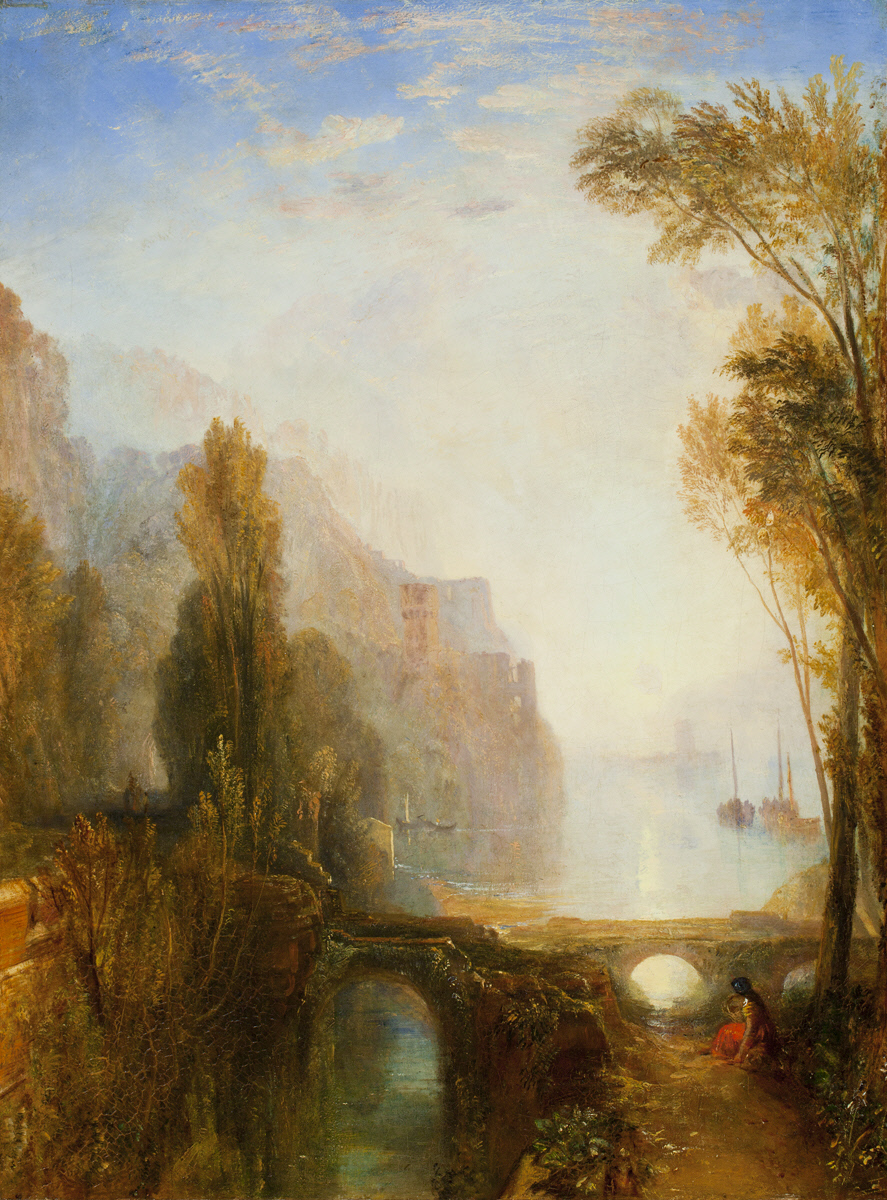
- Artist: J. M. W. Turner
- Year: 1829
- Type: Oil on canvas, landscape painting
- Dimensions: 71.3 cm × 53.3 cm (28.1 in × 21.0 in)
- Location: Worcester Art Museum, Massachusetts
- Accession no.: 1940.59

The Banks of the Loire is an 1829 landscape painting by the British artist J.M.W. Turner. It portrays a view on the Loire River in France. Turner had visited the region in 1826 where he produced many sketches.

The painting was displayed at the Royal Academy Exhibition of 1829 at Somerset House in London. Turner had recently been travelling in Italy and concerned that the paintings he had produced in his Rome studio would not arrive in time to display, he worked up several other pictures in time for the exhibition including The Loretto Necklace.

The painting has been in the collection of the Worcester Art Museum in Worcester, Massachusetts since 1940.

== See also ==
- List of paintings by J. M. W. Turner

== Bibliography ==
- Bailey, Anthony. J.M.W. Turner: Standing in the Sun. Tate Enterprises Ltd, 2013.
- Reynolds, Graham. Turner. Thames and Hudson, 2022.
- Warrell, Ian. Turner on the Loire. Tate Gallery, 1997.
