= Hadleigh Castle (painting) =

Painting by John Constable

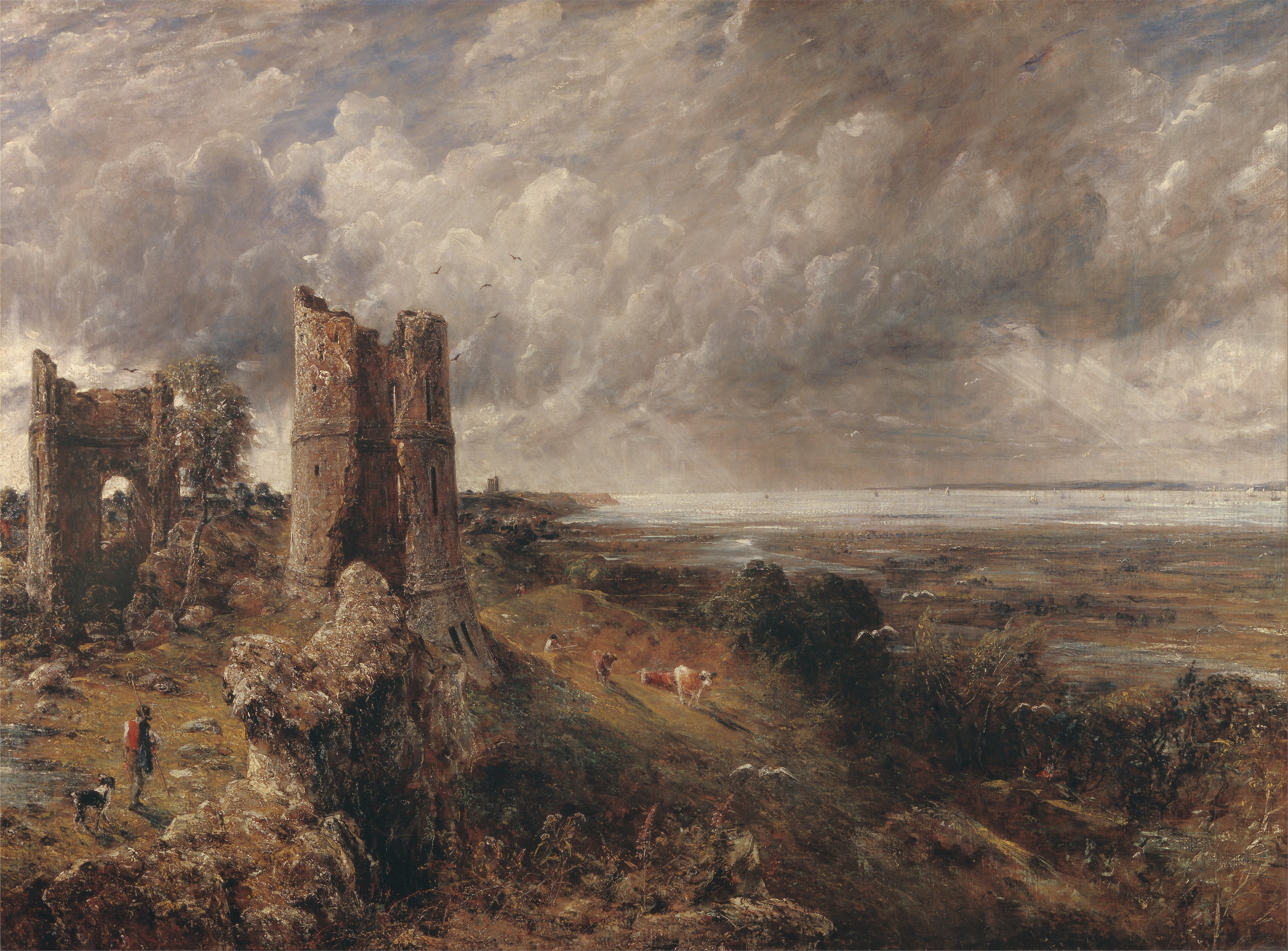
- Artist: John Constable
- Year: 1829
- Type: Oil on canvas
- Dimensions: 121.9 cm × 164.5 cm (48.0 in × 64.8 in)
- Location: Yale Center for British Art, New Haven

Hadleigh Castle is an oil painting by the English painter John Constable, created in 1829. It is held at the Yale Center for British Art, in New Haven.

Constable visited Hadleigh Castle in 1814 and made a drawing of the castle. This he developed into a full-sized oil sketch in preparation for a finished painting, executed in 1829 and exhibited at the Royal Academy Exhibition of 1829. The sketch is displayed at the Tate Gallery, London, while the finished painting now hangs in the Yale Center for British Art at New Haven, United States. Constable's painting, "one of his most monumental works" according to art historians Tammis Groft and Mary Mackay, shows Hadleigh Castle as a decaying man-made structure, succumbing to the elemental power of nature. The piece is also especially representative of English Romanticism in the nineteenth century as evidenced by spiritual presence of nature dominating the subject of the castle, as well as the rough brushstrokes enhancing this intensity.

== See also ==
- List of paintings by John Constable

== Bibliography ==
- Groft, Tammis Kane and Mary Alice Mackay. (1998) Albany Institute of History & Art: 200 years of collecting. New York: Hudsdon Hills Press. ISBN 978-1-55595-101-6.
