= The Loretto Necklace =

Painting by J. M. W. Turner

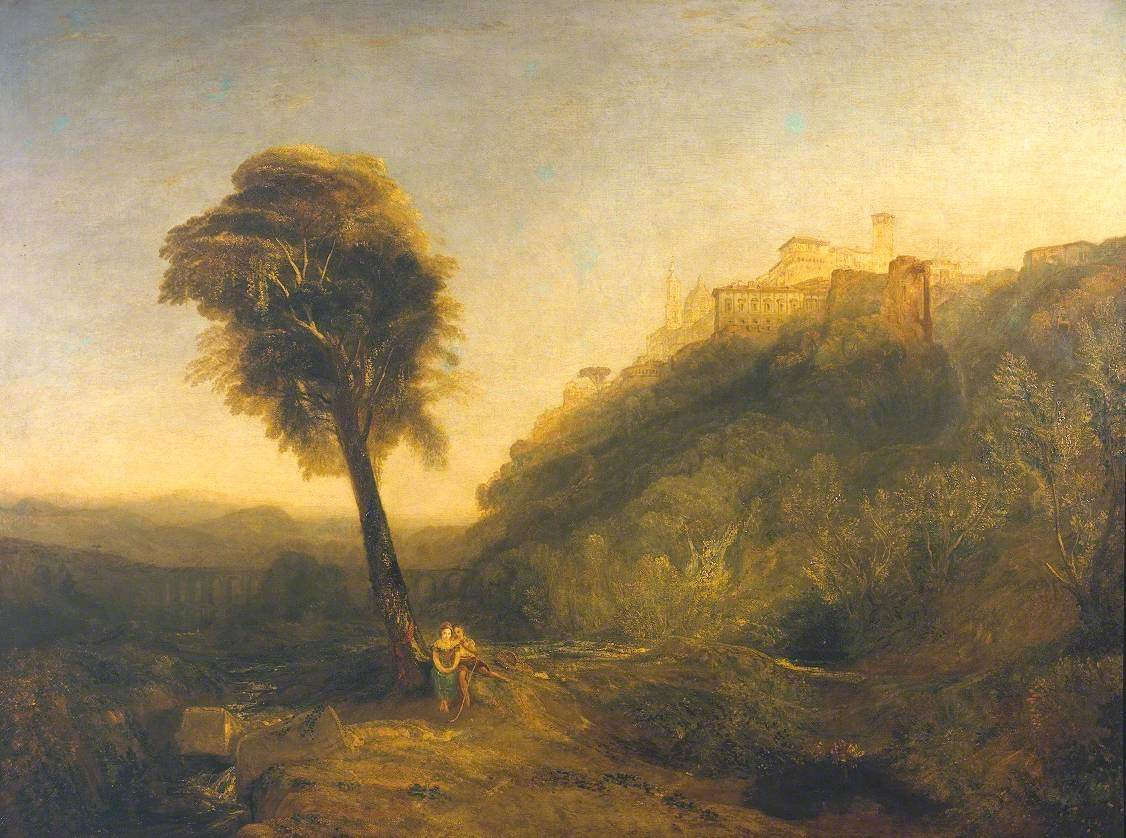
- Artist: J. M. W. Turner
- Year: 1829
- Medium: Oil on canvas
- Dimensions: 174.9 cm × 130.8 cm (68.9 in × 51.5 in)
- Location: Tate Britain, London
- Accession: N00509
- Website: tate.org.uk/art/artworks/turner-the-loretto-necklace-n00509

The Loretto Necklace is an 1829 landscape painting by the British artist J.M.W. Turner. It shows a view of the town of Loreto in the Italian province of Marche.

Turner had been on an extended visit to Rome during which he has produced several works. After arriving back in London and concerned that these paintings, still in transit, would not arrive in time for the Royal Academy's Summer Exhibition he produced a fresh work for the show. He produced a view of the town he had stopped in on his journey back from Rome.

It appeared at the 1829 academy exhibition at Somerset House along with another Turner work Ulysses Deriding Polyphemus. Today it isn the collection of the Tate Britain having been part of the Turner Bequest in 1856.

== See also ==
- List of paintings by J. M. W. Turner

== Bibliography ==
- Bailey, Anthony. J.M.W. Turner: Standing in the Sun. Tate Enterprises, 2013.
- Pointon, Marcia C. Brilliant Effects: A Cultural History of Gem Stones and Jewellery. Paul Mellon Centre for Studies in British Art, 2009
- Reynolds, Graham. Turner. Thames and Hudson, 2022.
