= Punch or May Day =

Painting by Benjamin Robert Haydon

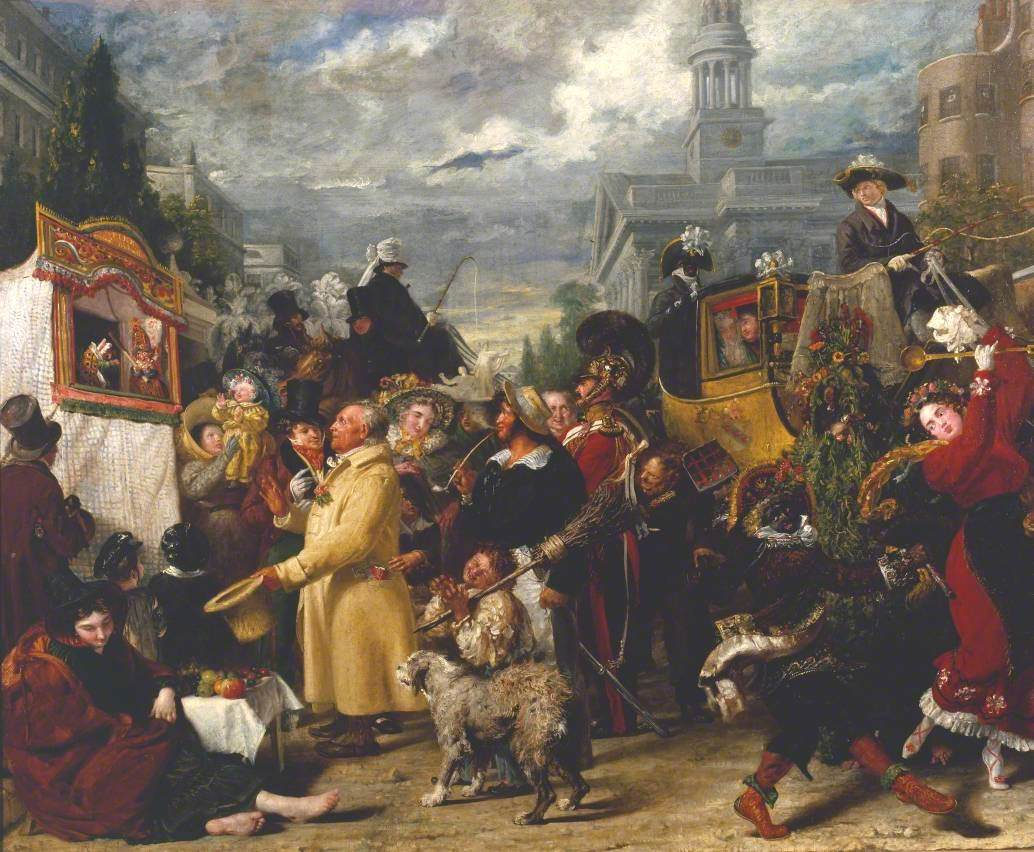
- Artist: Benjamin Robert Haydon
- Year: 1829
- Type: Oil on canvas, genre painting
- Dimensions: 150.5 cm × 185.1 cm (59.3 in × 72.9 in)
- Location: Tate Gallery, London

Punch or May Day is an 1829 genre painting by the British artist Benjamin Robert Haydon. It depicts a street scene on the May Day holiday in the Marylebone district of London during the final year of the reign of George IV at the end of the Regency era.

The canvas is filled with multiple mini-scenes including a Punch and Judy the coach of a newly married couple and a funeral procession. In the background on the right is St Marylebone Church. Today it is in the Tate Collection, having been bequeathed by George Darling in 1862.

== Bibliography ==
- Dart, Gregory. Metropolitan Art and Literature, 1810-1840: Cockney Adventures. Cambridge University Press, 2012.
- Qureshi, Sadiah. Peoples on Parade: Exhibitions, Empire, and Anthropology in Nineteenth-Century Britain. University of Chicago Press, 2011.
- Solkin, David H. Painting Out of the Ordinary: Modernity and the Art of Everyday Life in Nineteenth-century Britain. Yale University Press, 2008.
