= Portrait of Maria II =

1829 painting by Thomas Lawrence

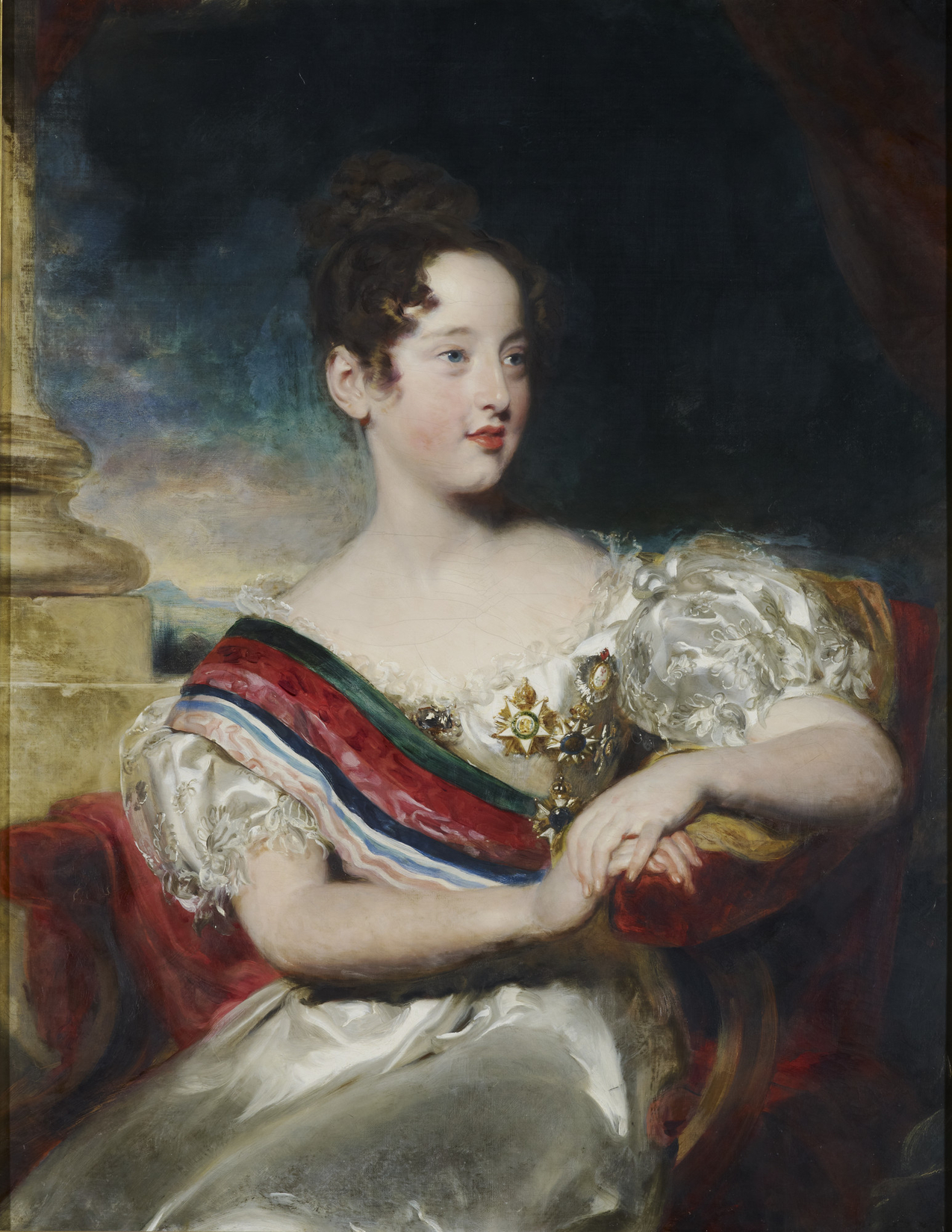
- Artist: Thomas Lawrence
- Year: 1829
- Type: Oil on canvas
- Dimensions: 92.4 cm × 71.8 cm (36.4 in × 28.3 in)
- Location: Royal Collection, Windsor Castle

Portrait of Maria II is an 1829 portrait painting by the British artist Thomas Lawrence depicting the Portuguese queen Maria II. Lawrence was the President of the Royal Academy and Britain's leading portraitist. It was painted between 1828 and 1829 while the young Maria was in exile in England during the Liberal Wars in Portugal. Lawrence depicts her in a white dress and wearing a number of orders represented by stars and ribbons. It was commissioned by George IV for two hundred guineas. It was one of the last works completed by Lawrence before his death in early 1830. It remains in the Royal Collection.

== Bibliography ==
- Garlick, Kenneth. Sir Thomas Lawrence: A Complete Catalogue of the Oil Paintings. Phaidon, 1989.
- Gower, Ronald Sutherland. George Romney And Sir Thomas Lawrence. ISBN 1437048676. 1882.
- Holmes, Richard. Thomas Lawrence Portraits. National Portrait Gallery, 2010.
- Levey, Michael. Sir Thomas Lawrence. ISBN 0300109989. Yale University Press, 2005.
