= The Battle of Borodino (painting) =

1829 painting by George Jones

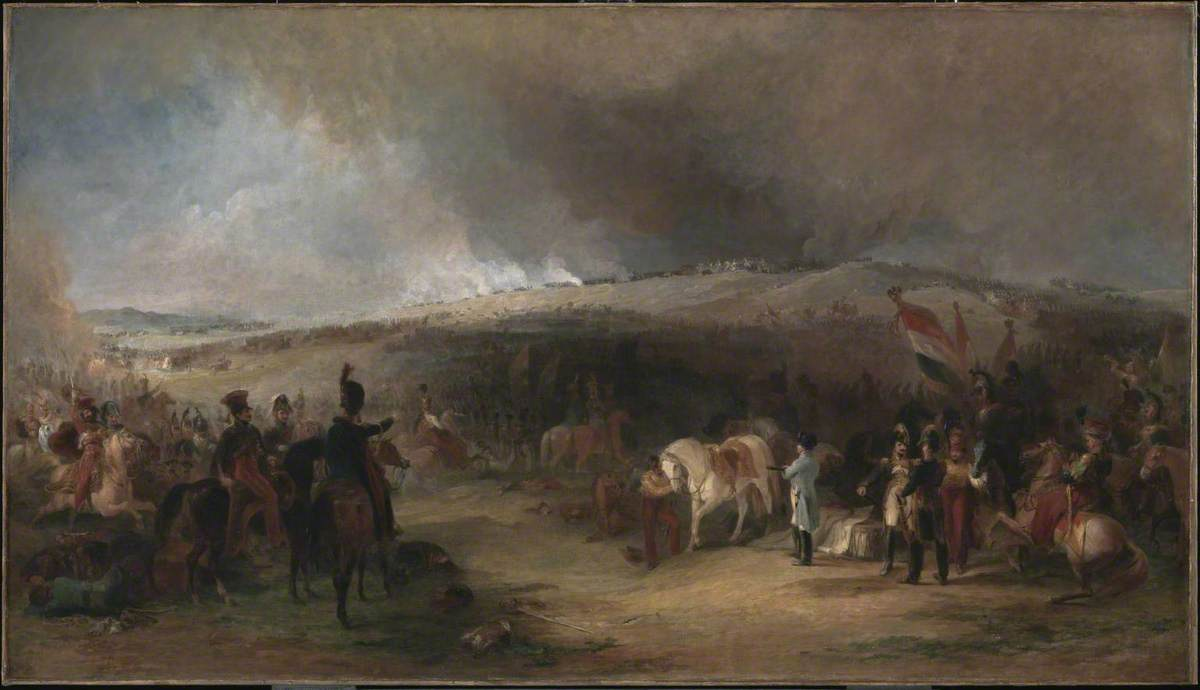
- Artist: George Jones
- Year: 1829
- Medium: Oil on canvas
- Dimensions: 213.4 cm × 121.9 cm (84.0 in × 48.0 in)
- Location: Tate Britain, London

The Battle of Borodino is an oil on canvas history painting by the British artist George Jones, from 1829.

== History and cleanup ==
It depicts the Battle of Borodino fought on 7 September 1812 during the French invasion of Russia. A French victory over Mikhail Kutuzov Russian Army, it was the last battle fought before they entered Moscow. Napoleon is seen on the right of the painting with his horse Marengo while the French cavalry commander Marshal Murat is on the left.

Jones was known for his history paintings of battles scenes, in 1822 he had been commissioned by George IV to produce The Battle of Vittoria and The Battle of Waterloo for St James's Palace.

The painting was displayed at the Royal Academy Exhibition of 1829 at Somerset House. It was then acquired by the art collector Robert Vernon who donated it to the National Gallery in 1847 as part of the Vernon Gift. It is now in the collection of the Tate Britain in Pimlico. James Baylie Allen subsequently produced an engraving based on the painting.

== Bibliography ==
- Hamlyn, Robin. Robert Vernon's Gift: British Art for the Nation 1847. Tate Gallery Publications, 1993.
