= Royal Academy Exhibition of 1829 =

1829 art exhibition in London

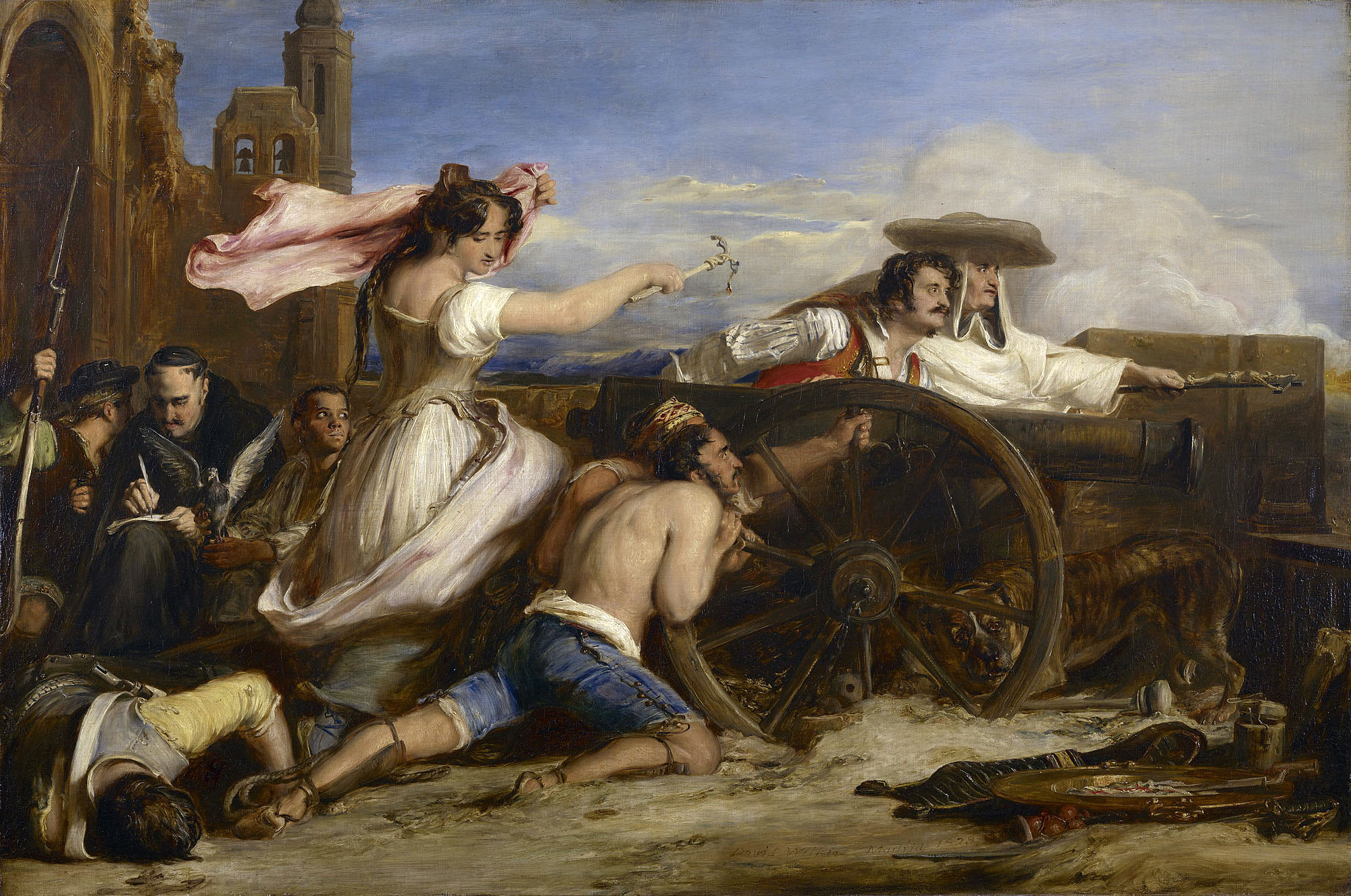
The Defence of Saragossa by David Wilkie

The Royal Academy Exhibition of 1829 was the sixty first annual Summer Exhibition of the Royal Academy of Arts in London. It was held at Somerset House between 4 May and 11 July towards the end of the Regency era. It featured more than 1200 works from painters, sculptors, engravers and architects.

The main talking point for many reviewers was the return of David Wilkie after three years absence in Continental Europe. He exhibited eight paintings, including genre scenes inspired by his travels as well as a trio of pictures featuring Spanish fighters in the Peninsular War. Many of these works were acquired by George IV for the Royal Collection. The Athenaeum considered William Etty's Benaiah the highlight of the exhibition. Edwin Landseer displayed The Illicit Highland Whisky Still. J.M.W. Turner has been on a recent visit to Italy. Correctly concerned that several of the paintings he had produced in Rome wouldn't arrive in time, he hurried off some works to display including The Loretto Necklace. The President of the Royal Academy Thomas Lawrence displayed several high society portraits including an including a picture of the Duke of Clarence who would the following year succeeded his brother to become William IV.

It was followed by the Royal Academy Exhibition of 1830, the first to be held following Lawrence's unexpected death.

== Gallery ==
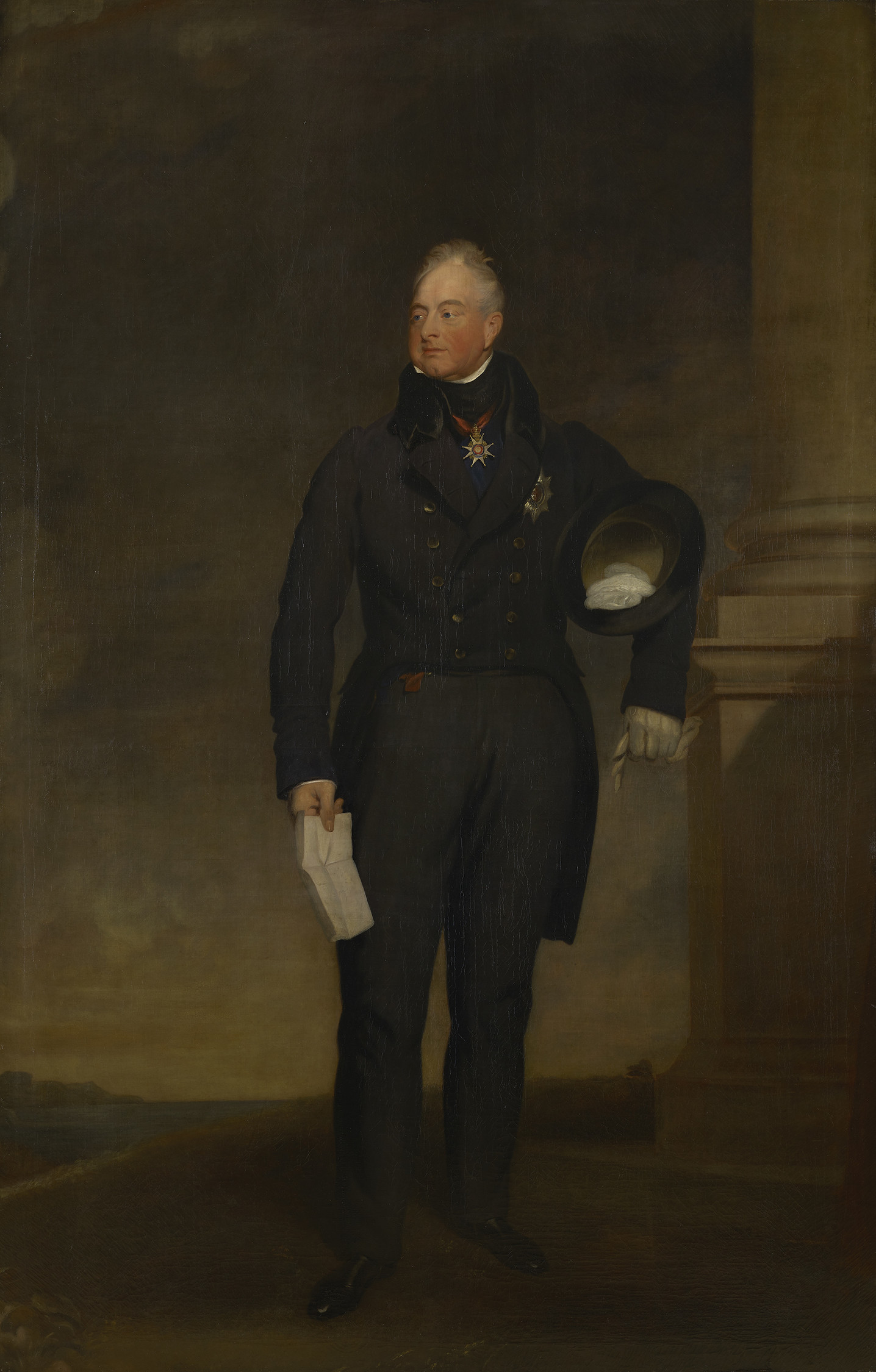
Portrait of the Duke of Clarence by Thomas Lawrence

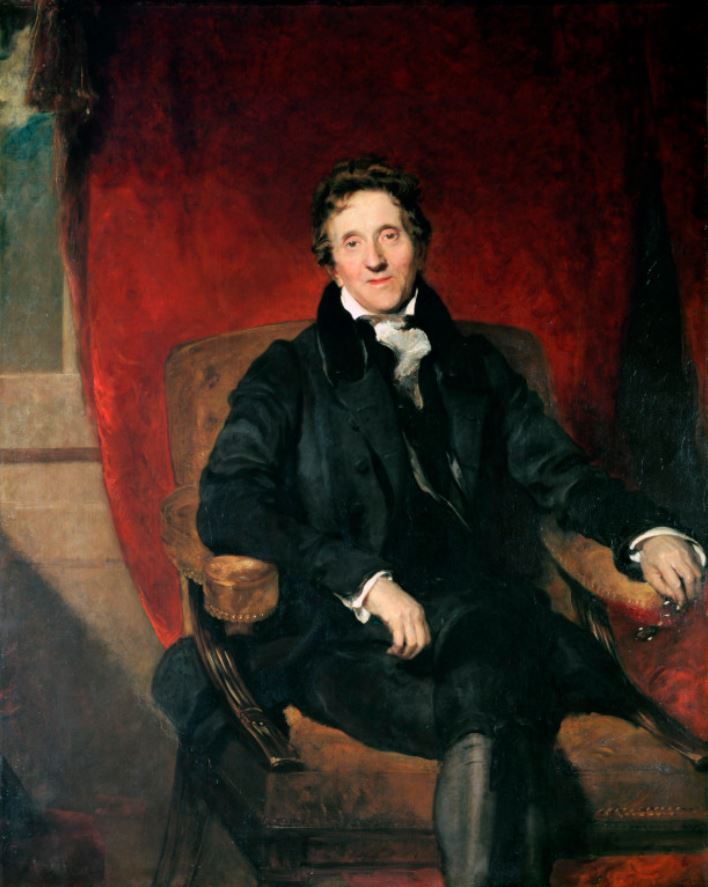
Portrait of John Soane by Thomas Lawrence

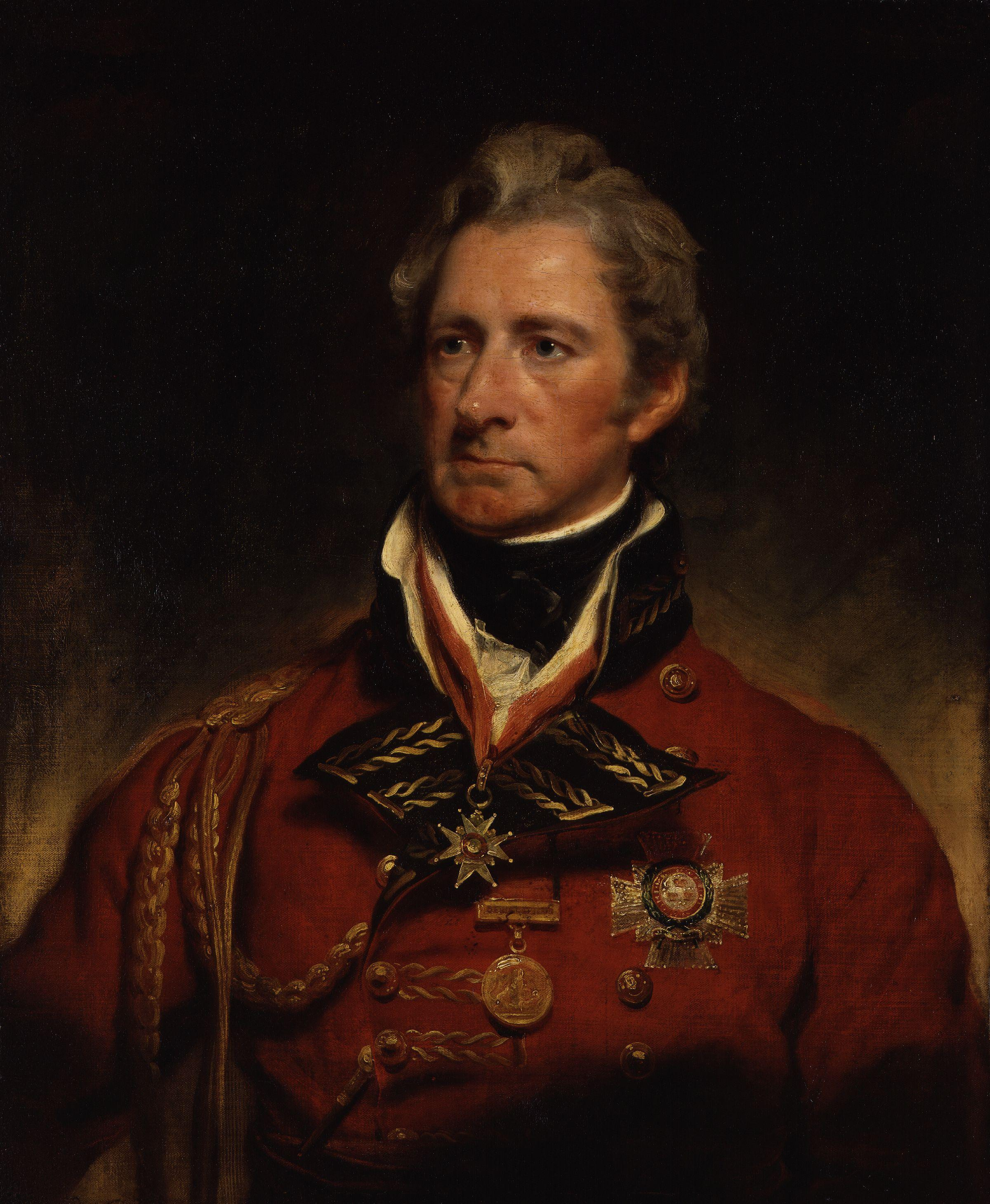
Portrait of Thomas Munro by Martin Archer Shee. An earlier version of the expanded painting displayed in 1829.

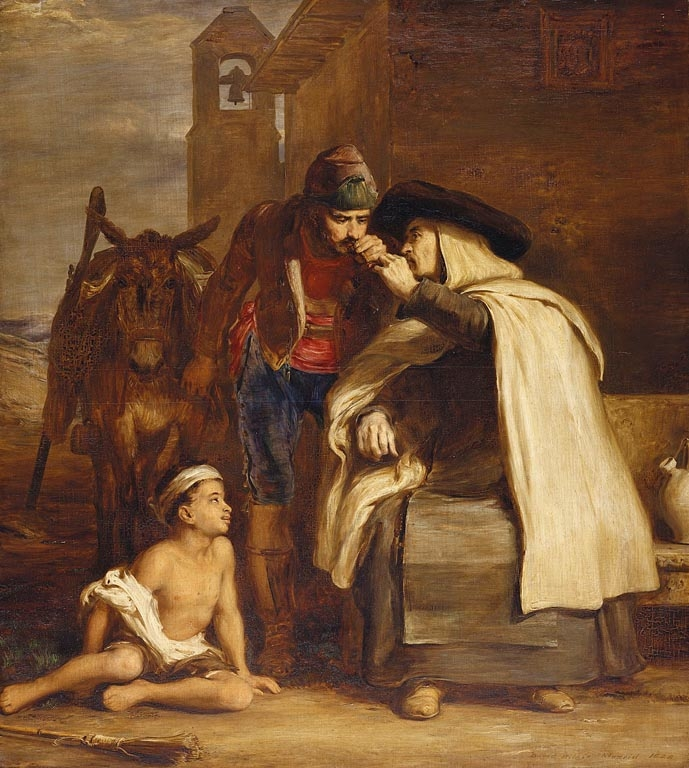
The Guerrilla's Departure by David Wilkie

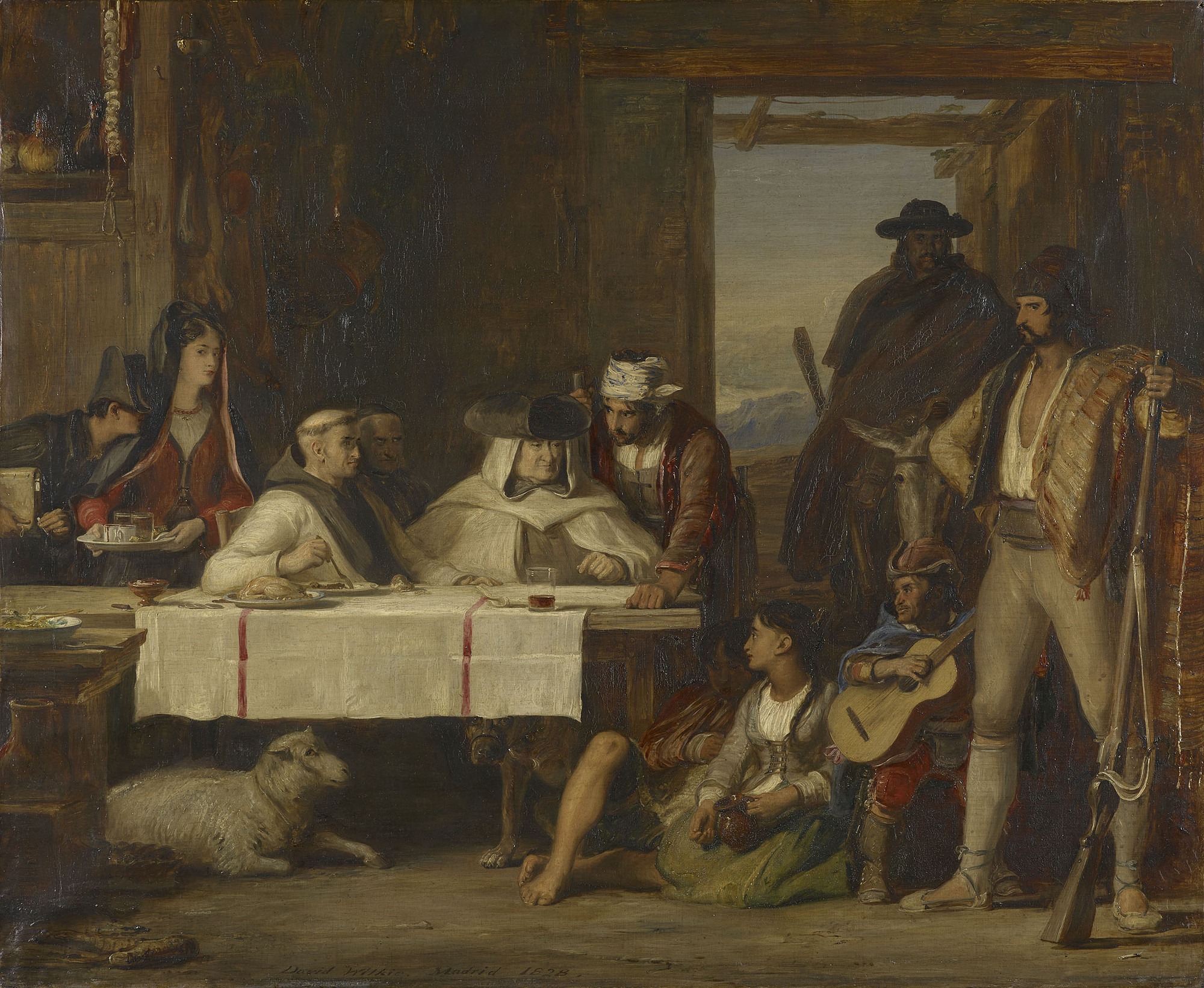
The Spanish Posada by David Wilkie

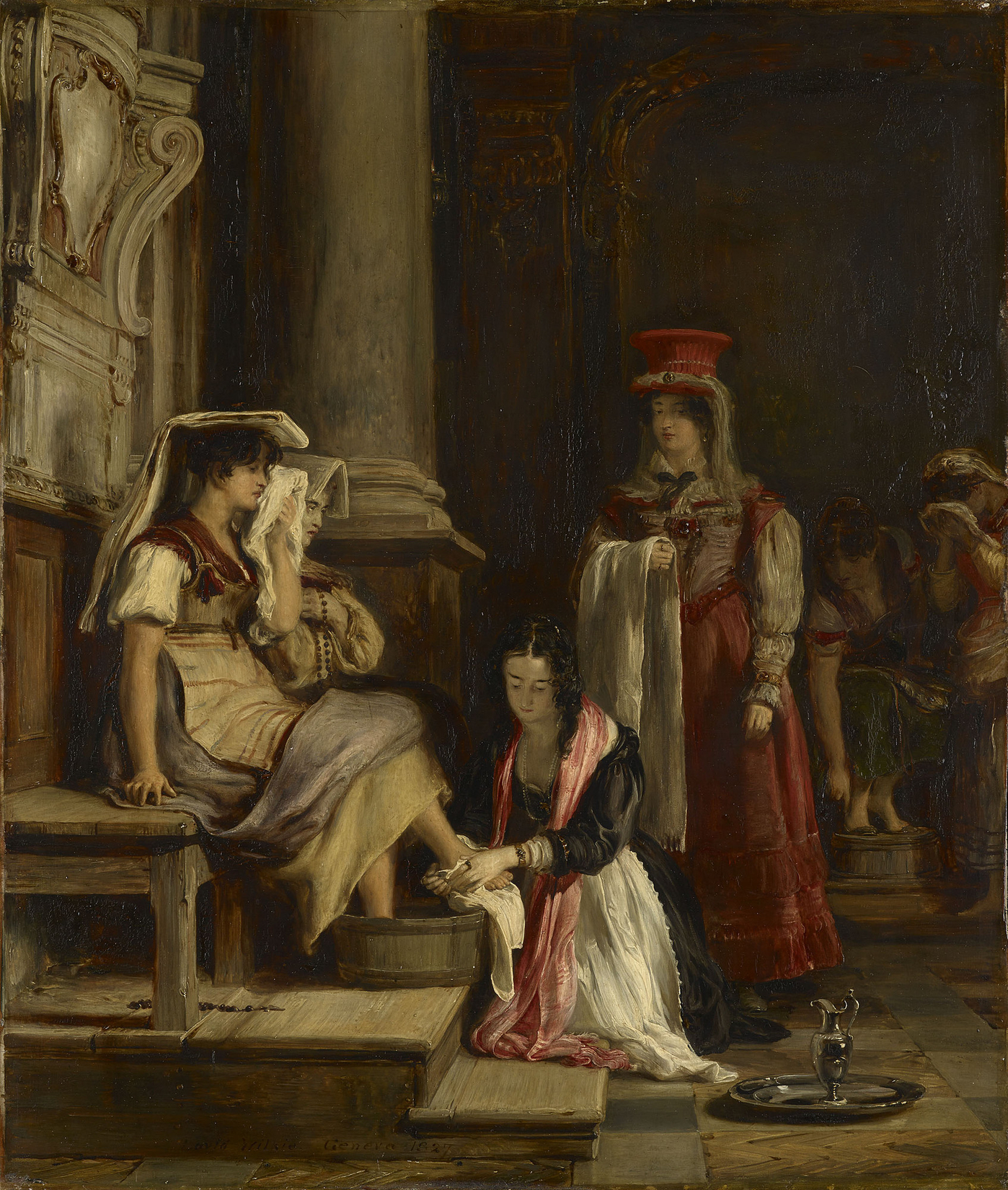
A Roman Princess Washing the Feet of Pilgrims by David Wilkie

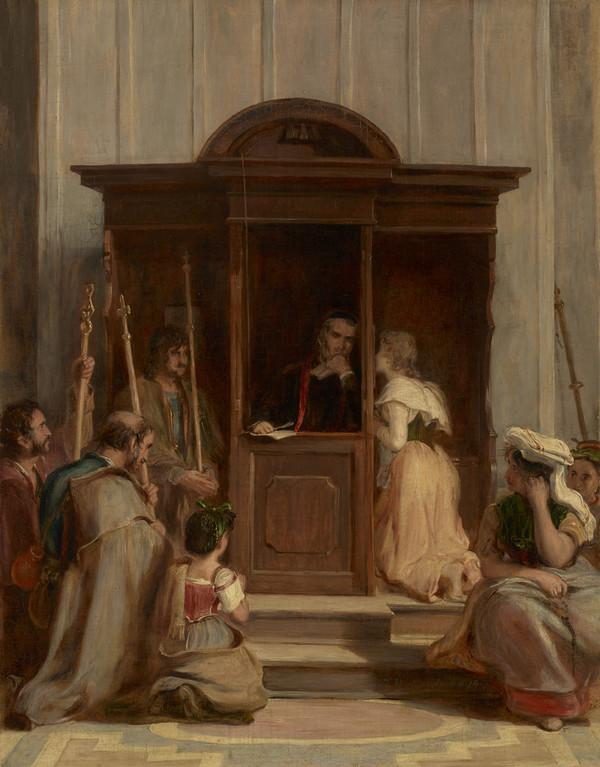
The Confessional by David Wilkie

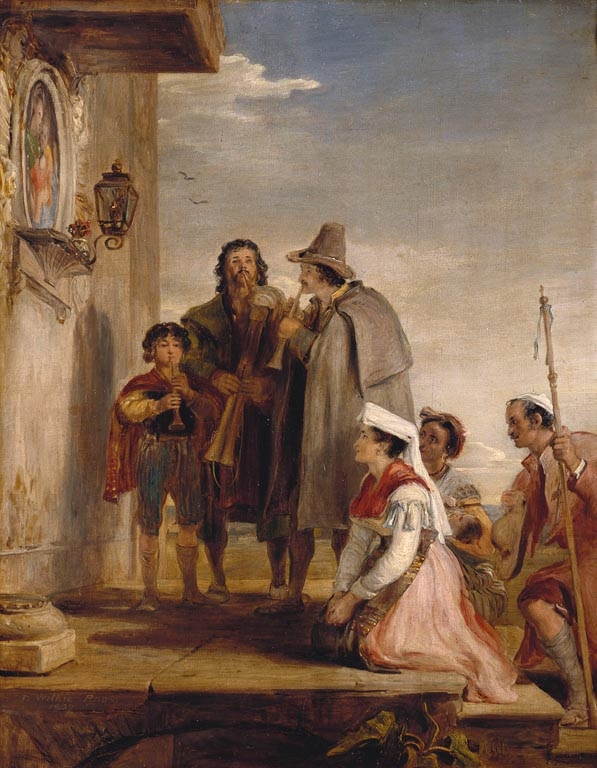
I Pifferari by David Wilkie

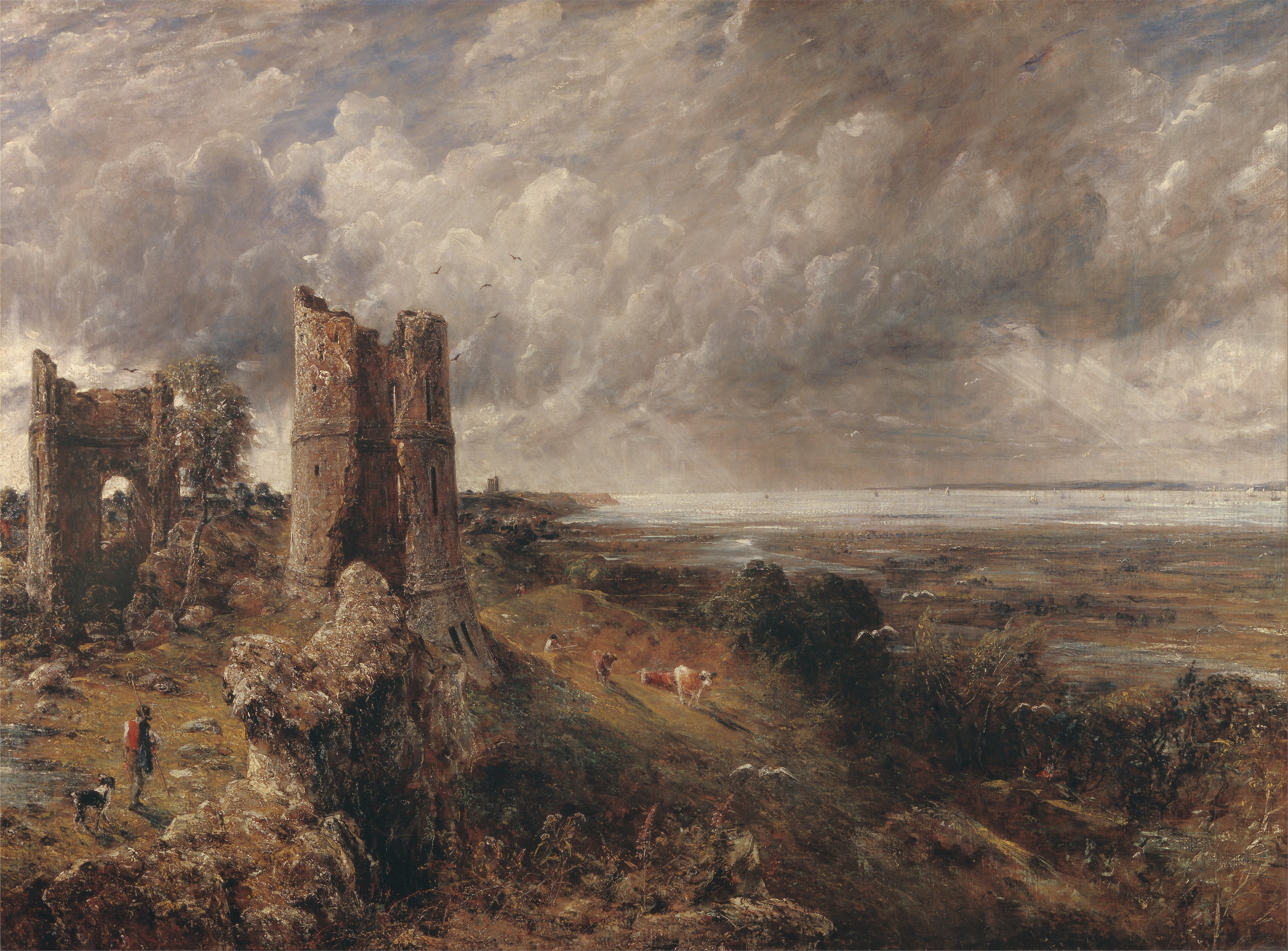
Hadleigh Castle by John Constable

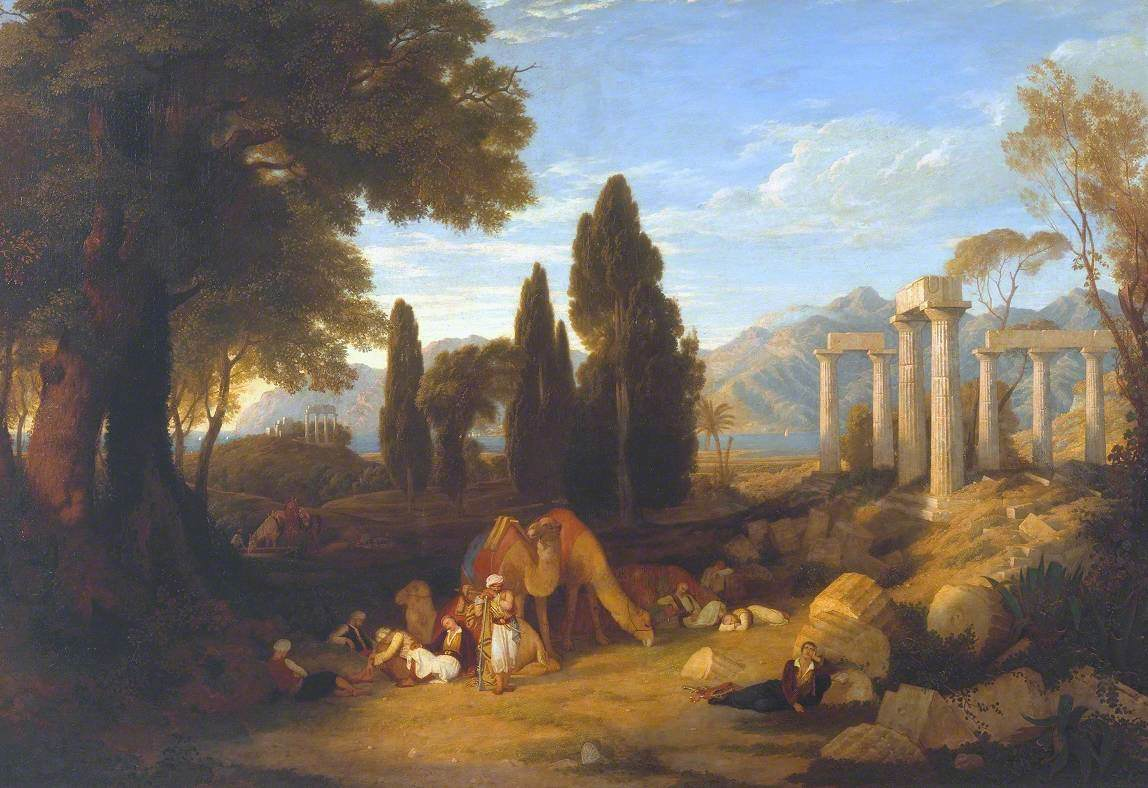
Lord Byron's Dream by Charles Lock Eastlake

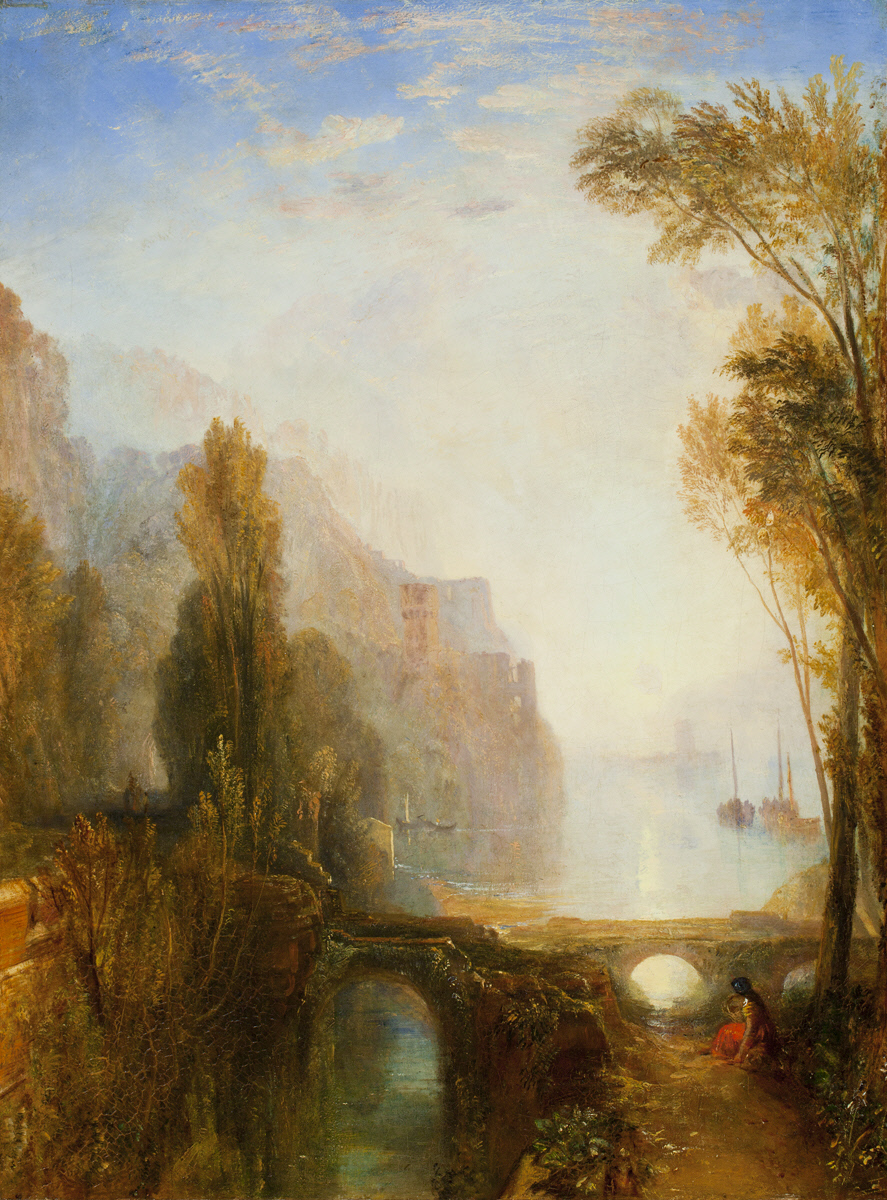
The Banks of the Loire by J.M.W. Turner

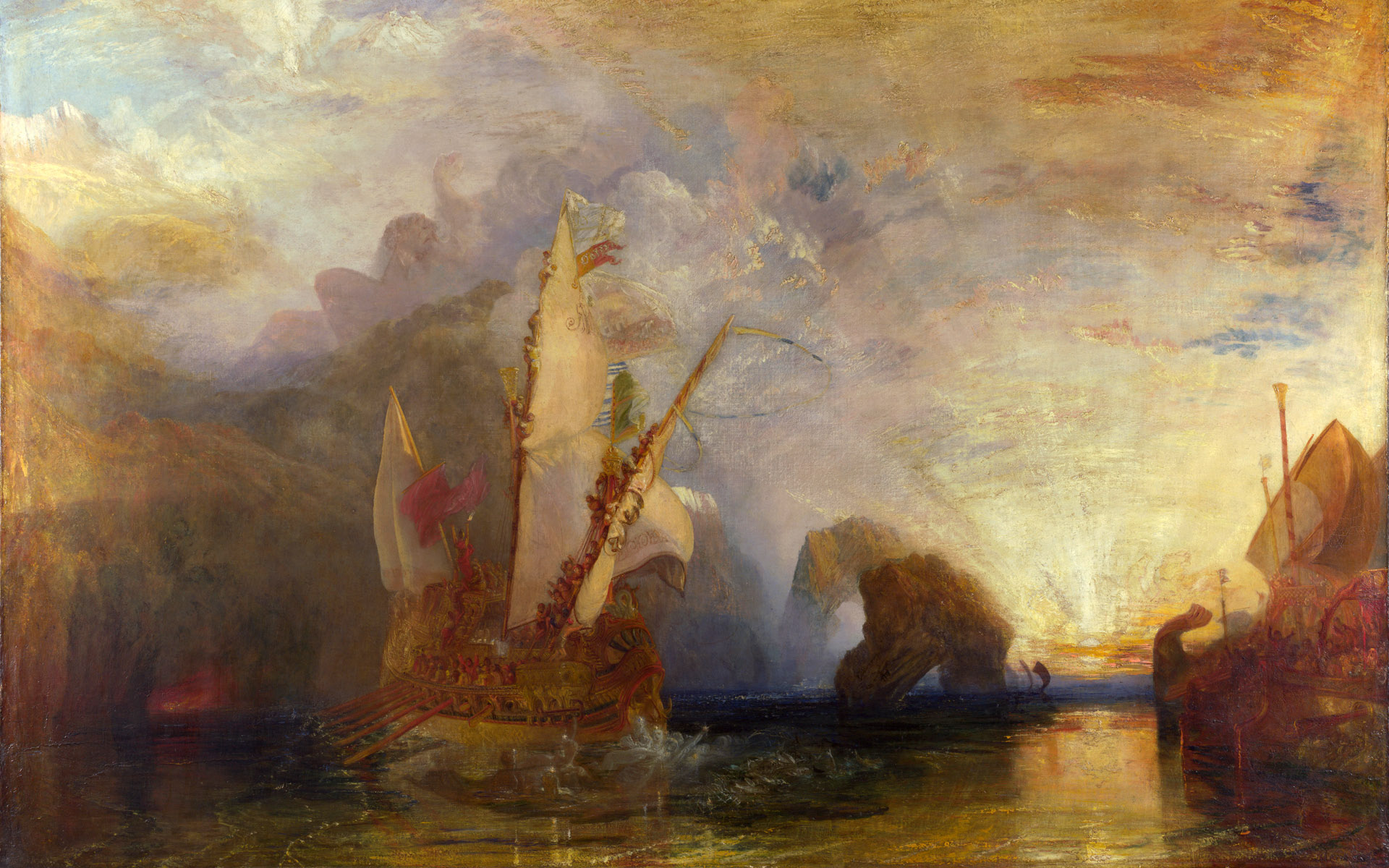
Ulysses Deriding Polyphemus by J.M.W. Turner

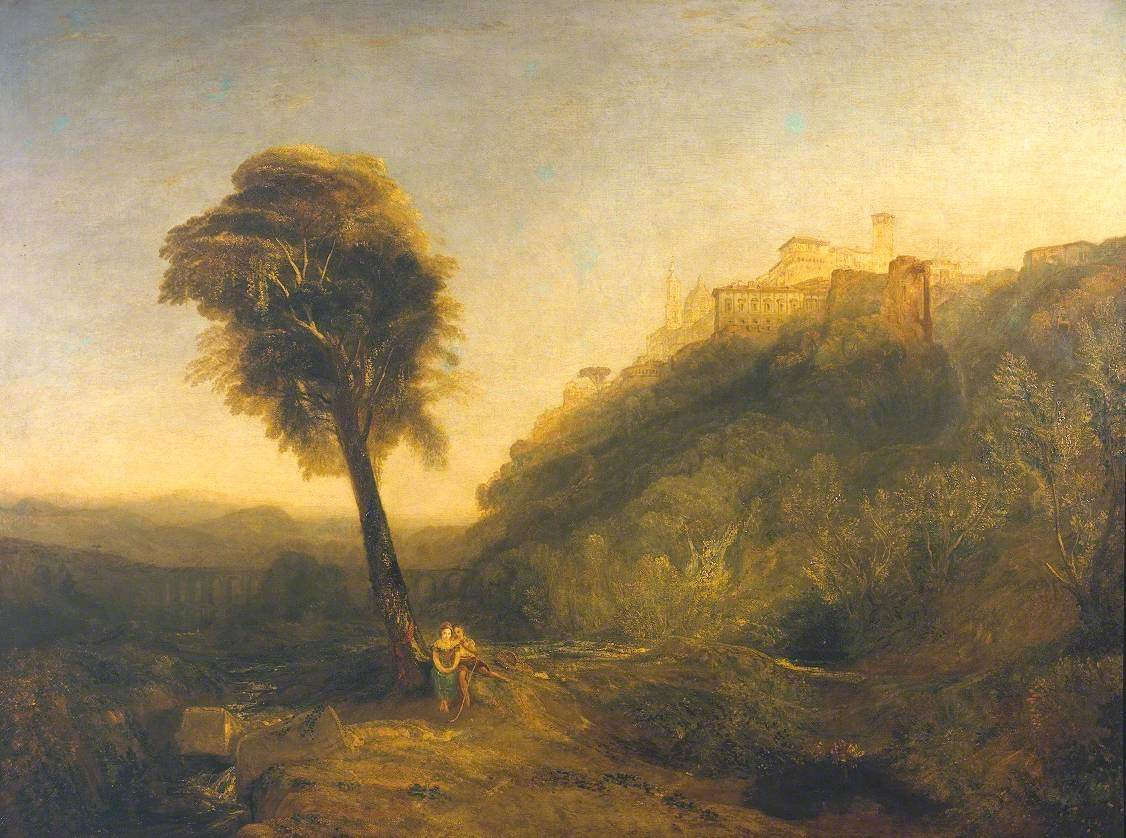
The Loretto Necklace by J.M.W. Turner

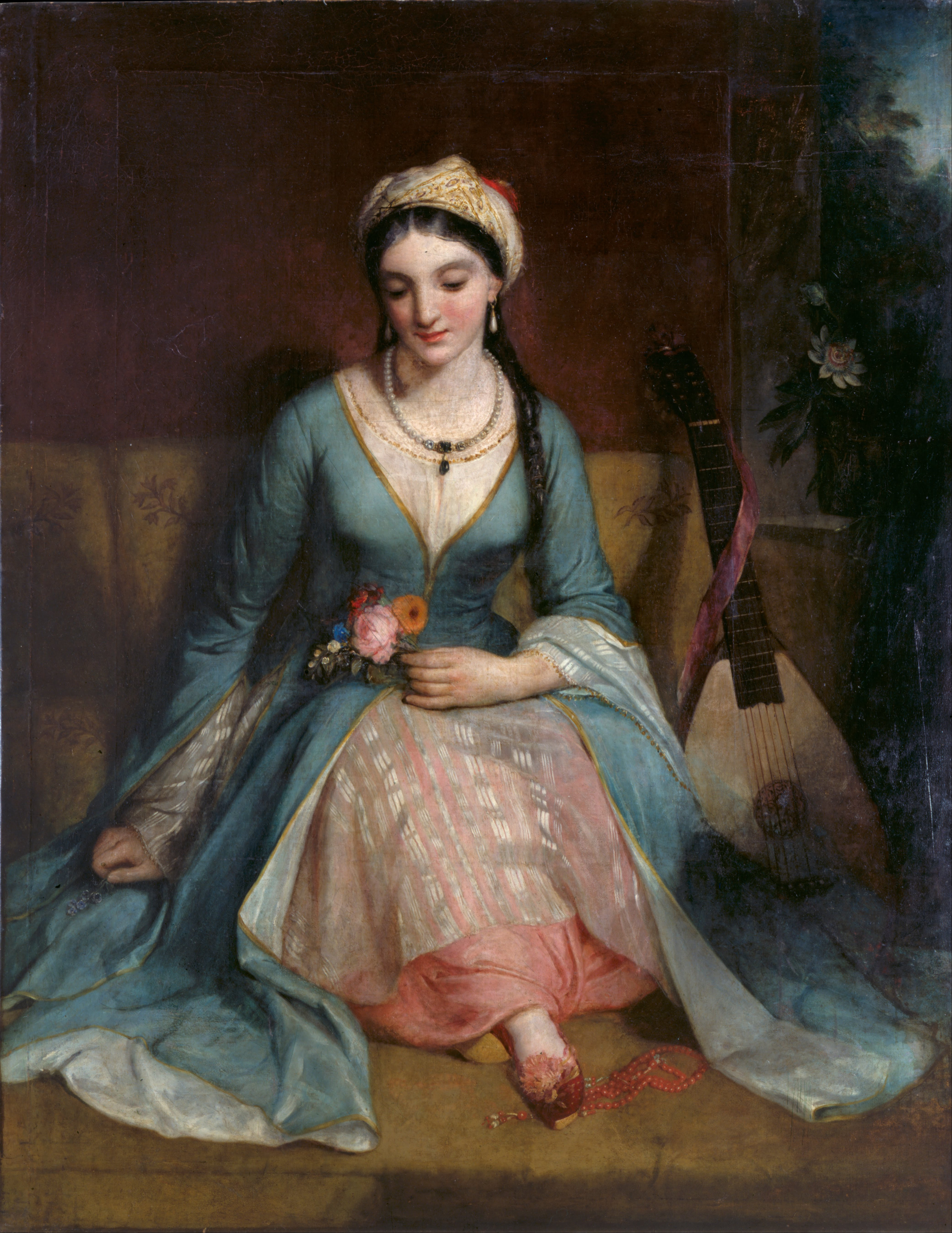
A Young Greek Woman by Henry William Pickersgill

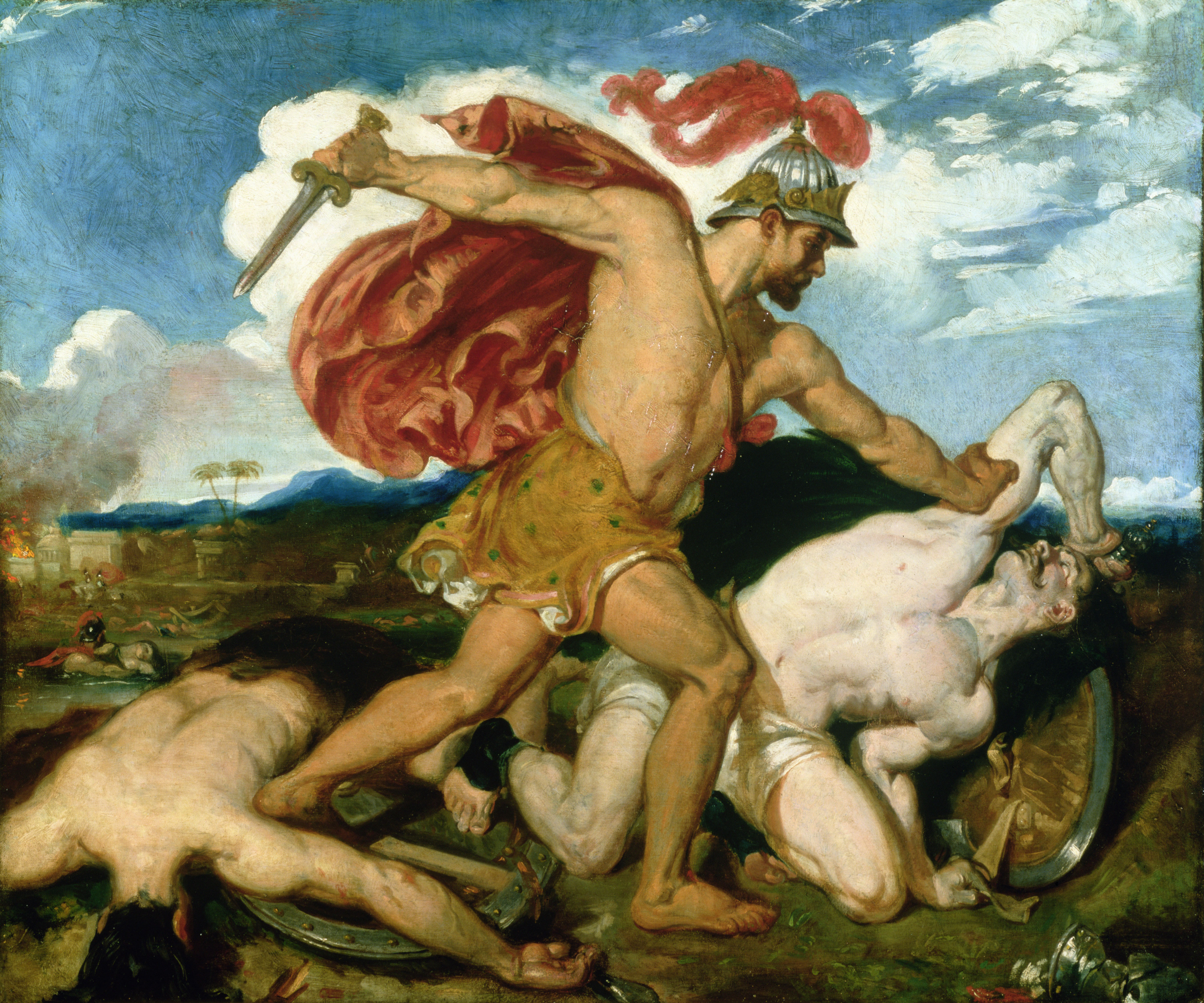
Beniah by William Etty

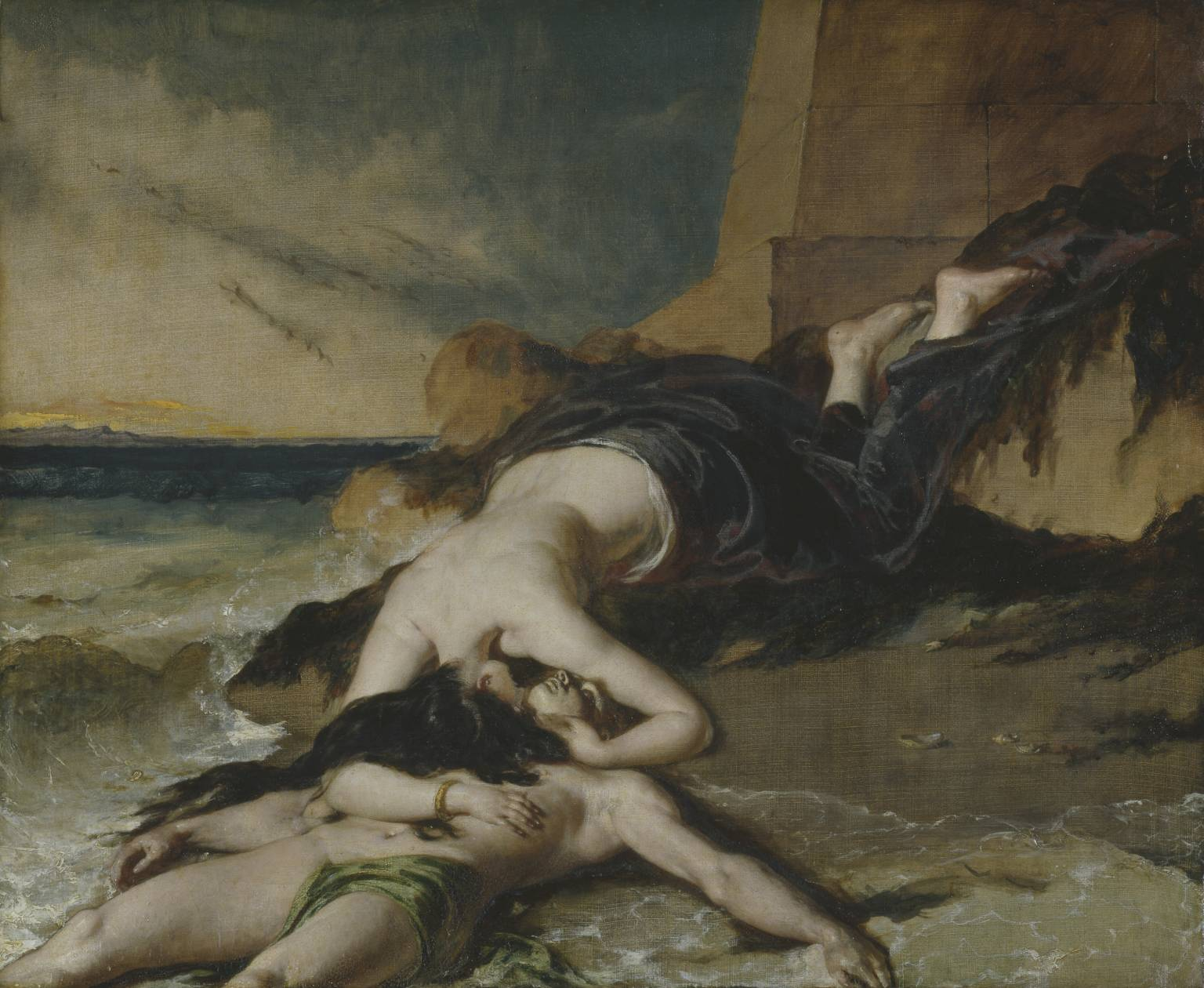
Hero Dying on Leander's Body by William Etty

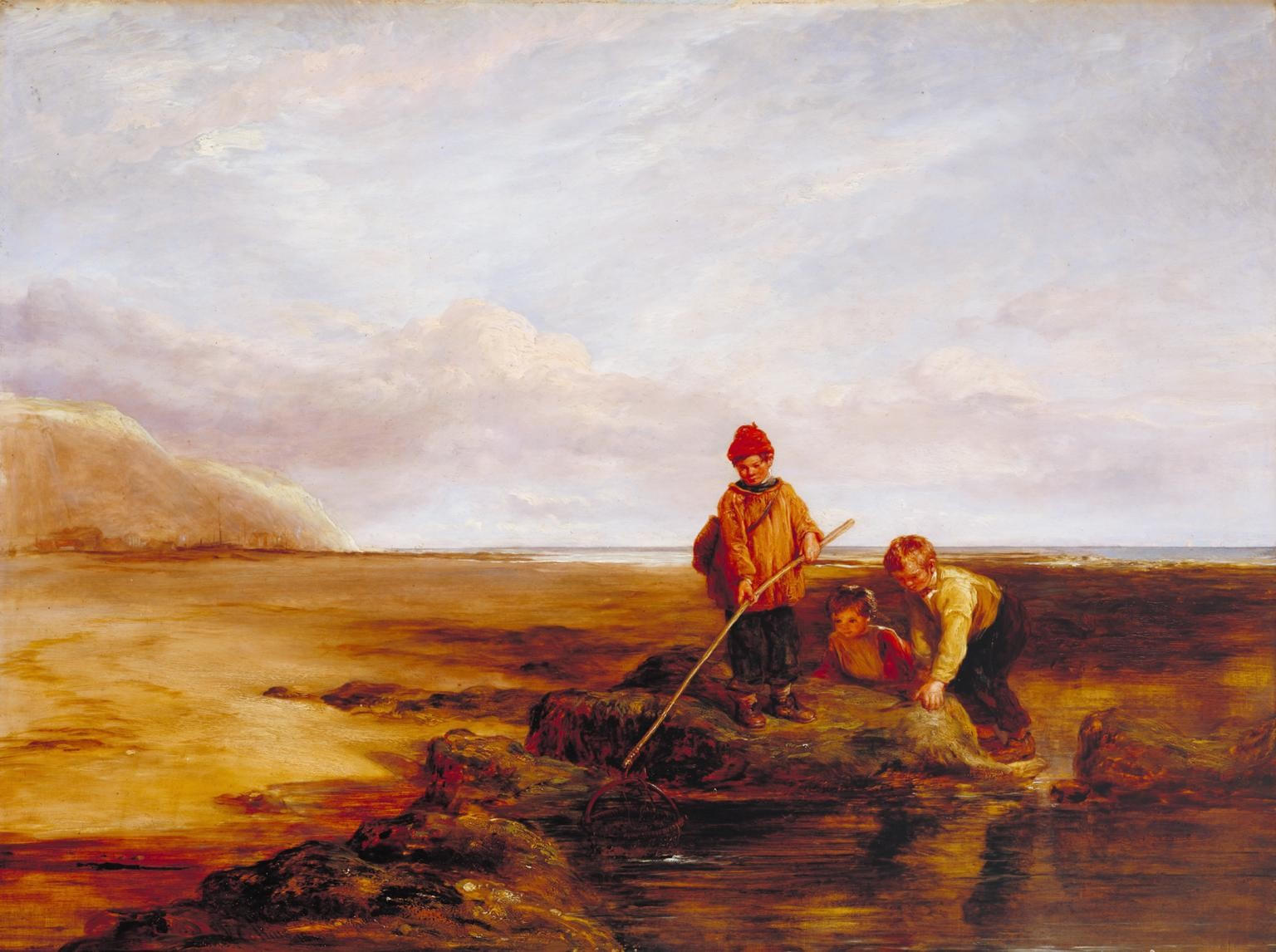
Prawn Fishing by William Collins

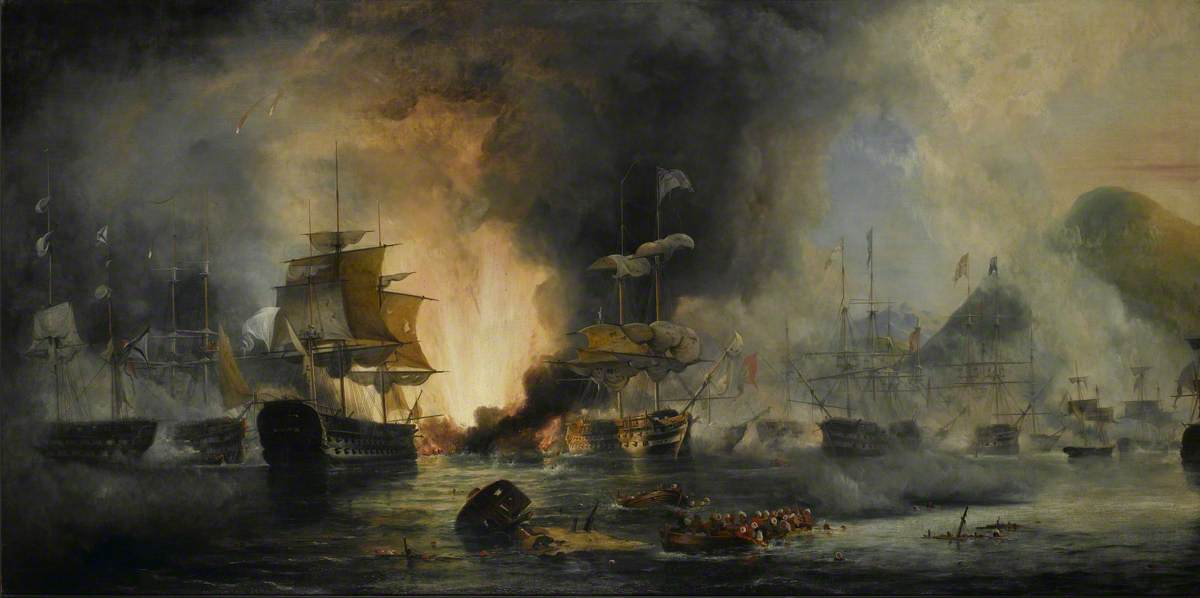
The Battle of Navarino by George Philip Reinagle

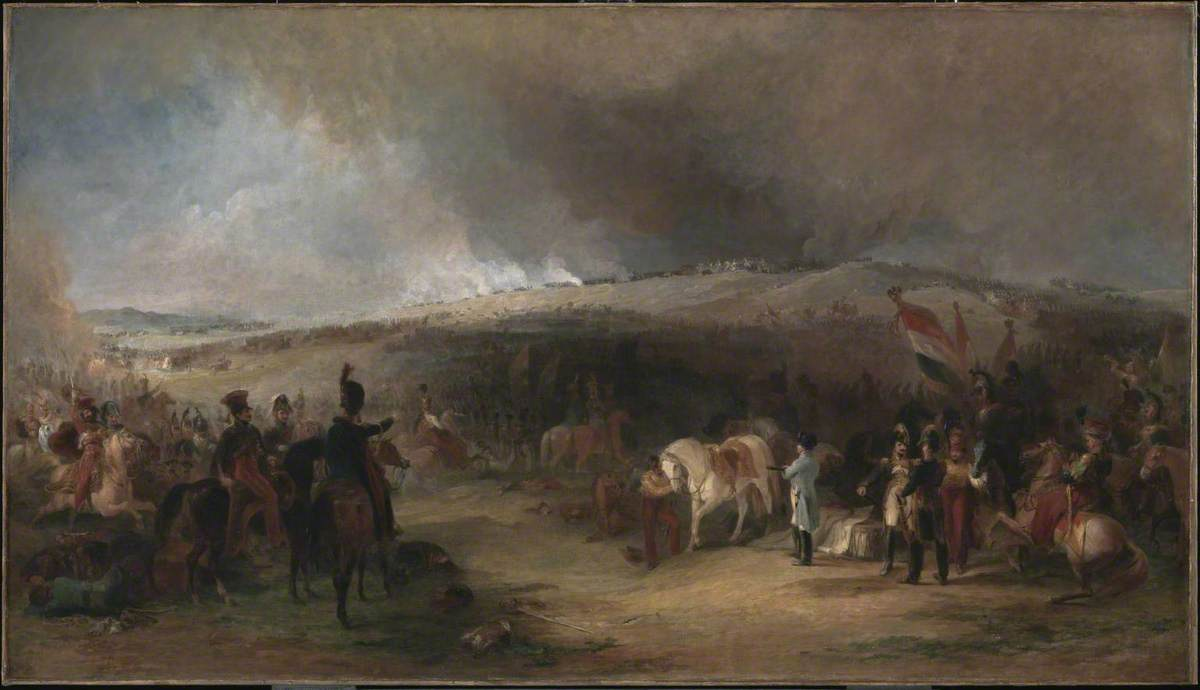
The Battle of Borodino by George Jones

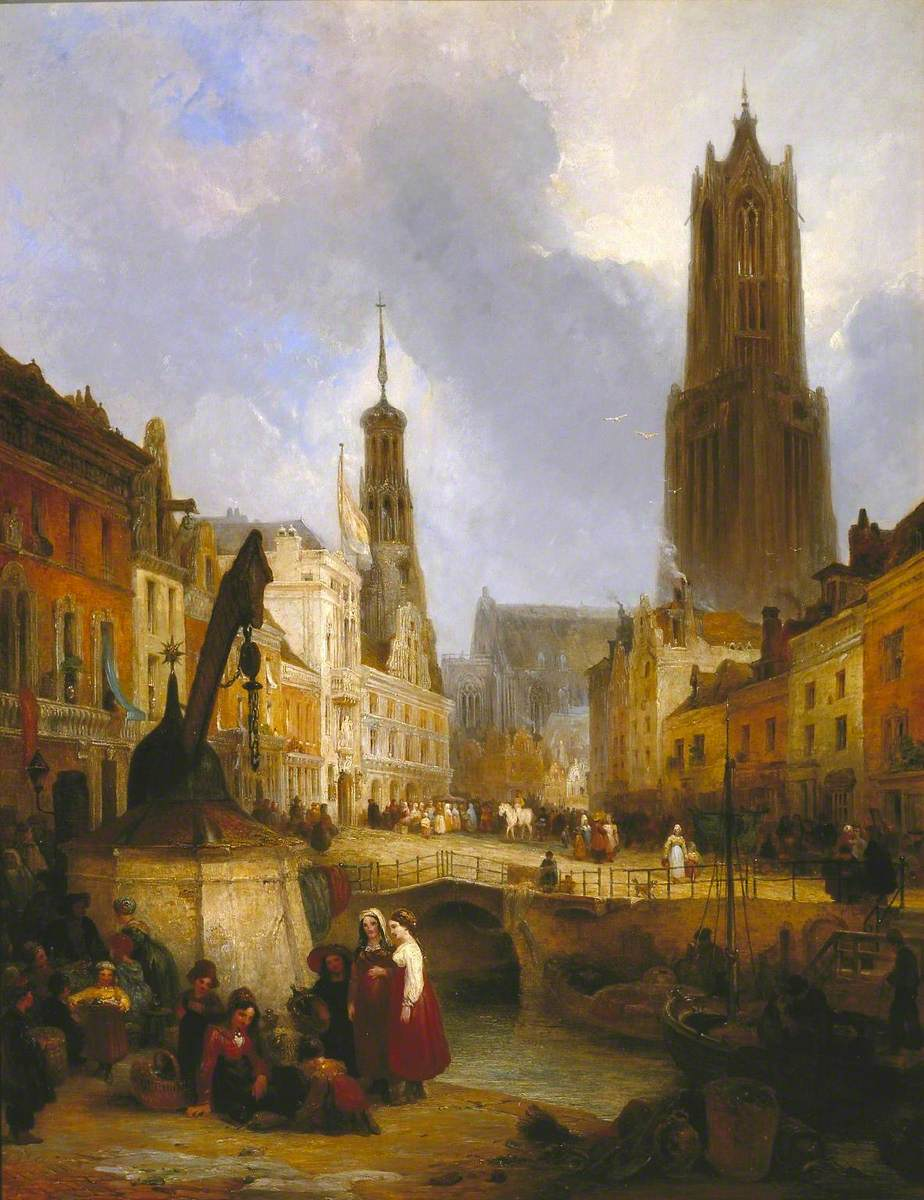
Utrecht by George Jones

Travellers in a Storm, Approach to Winchester by Copley Fielding

The Illicit Highland Whisky Still by Edwin Landseer

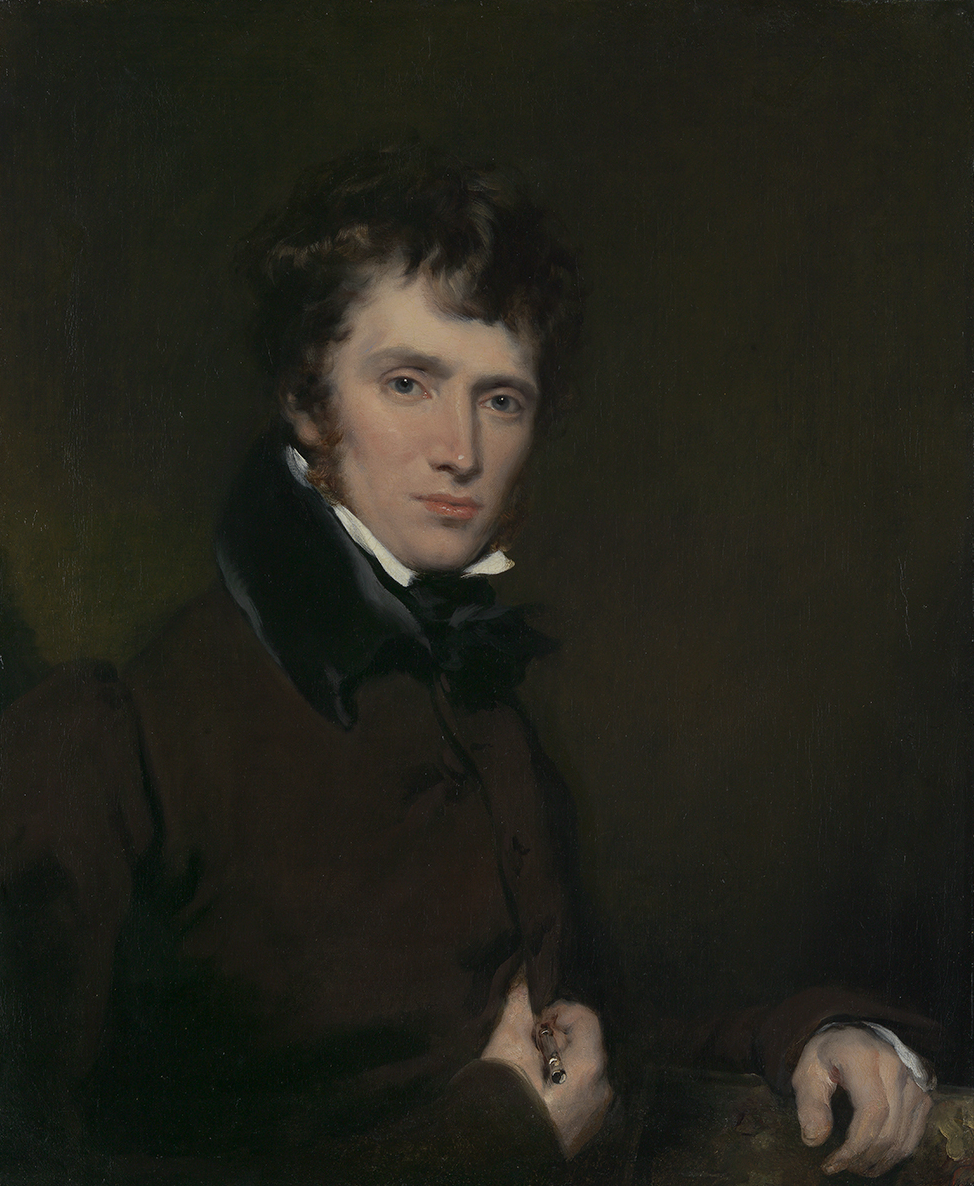
Portrait of Clarkson Stanfield by John Simpson

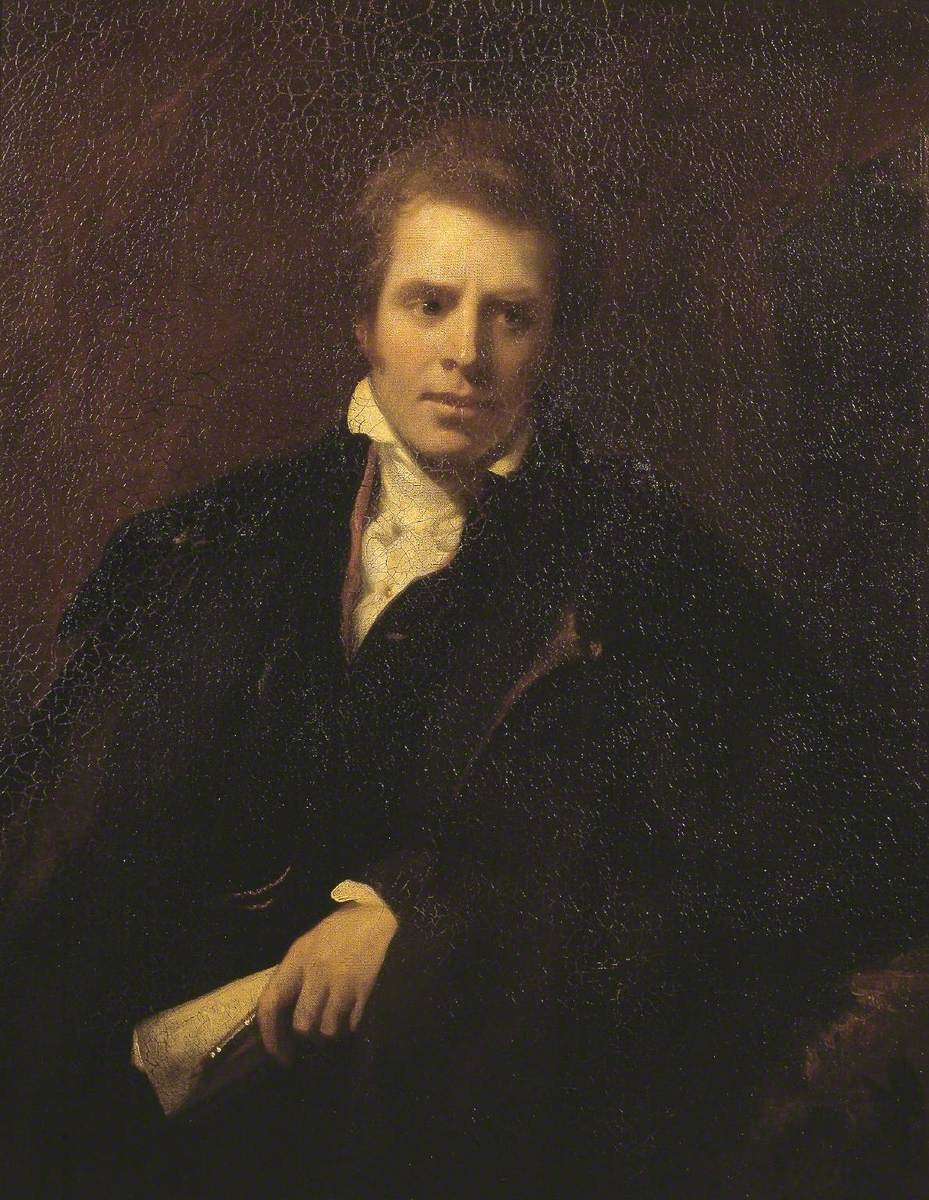
Portrait of David Wilkie by Thomas Phillips

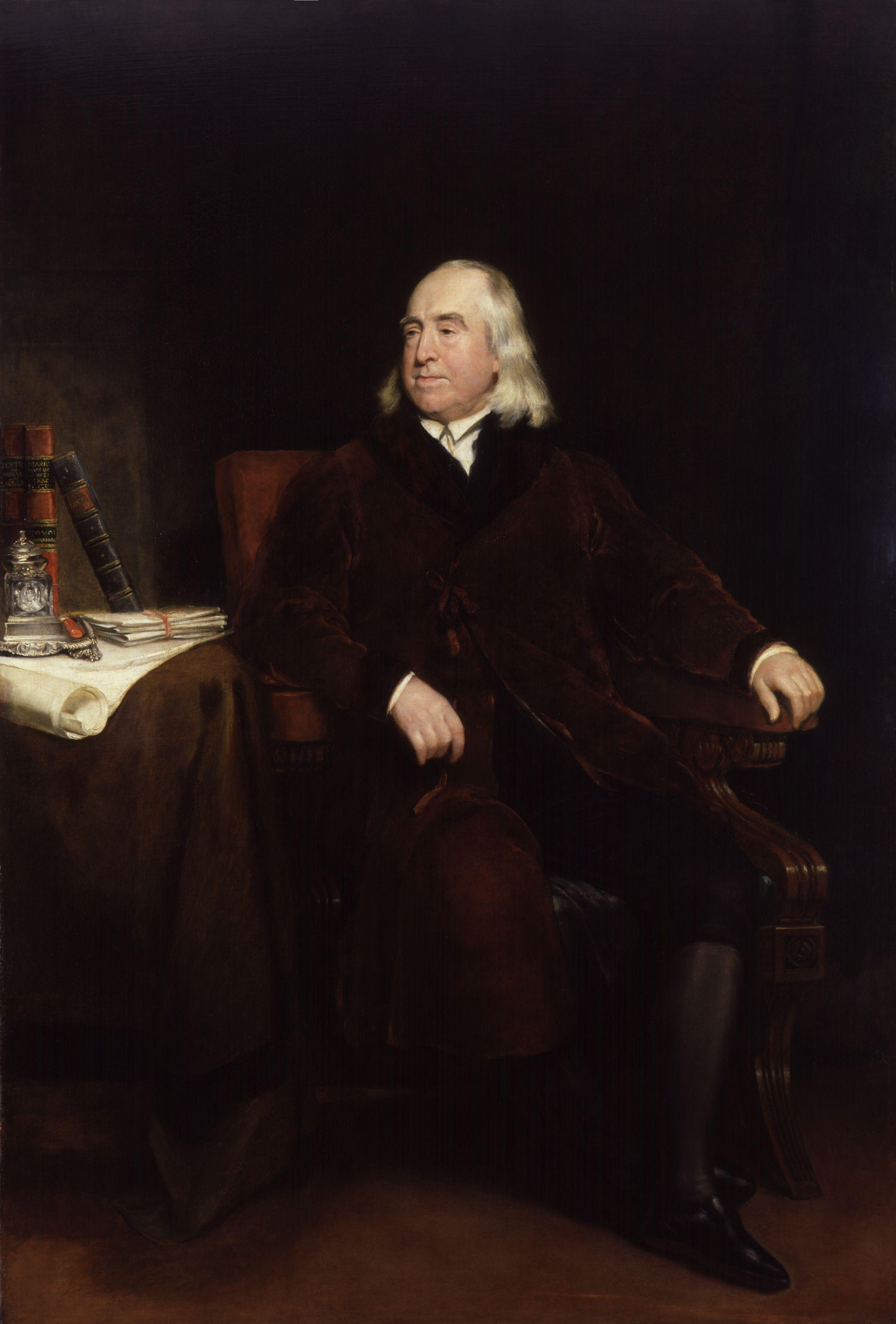
Portrait of Jeremy Bentham by Henry William Pickersgill

Portrait of Samuel Rush Meyrick by Henry Perronet Briggs

== Bibliography ==
- Levey, Michael. Sir Thomas Lawrence. Yale University Press, 2005.
- Noon, Patrick & Bann, Stephen. Constable to Delacroix: British Art and the French Romantics. Tate, 2003.
- Reynolds, Graham. Constable's England. Metropolitan Museum of Art, 1983.
- Tromans, Nicholas. David Wilkie: The People's Painter. Edinburgh University Press, 2007.
