= Portrait of John Soane =

1829 painting by Thomas Lawrence

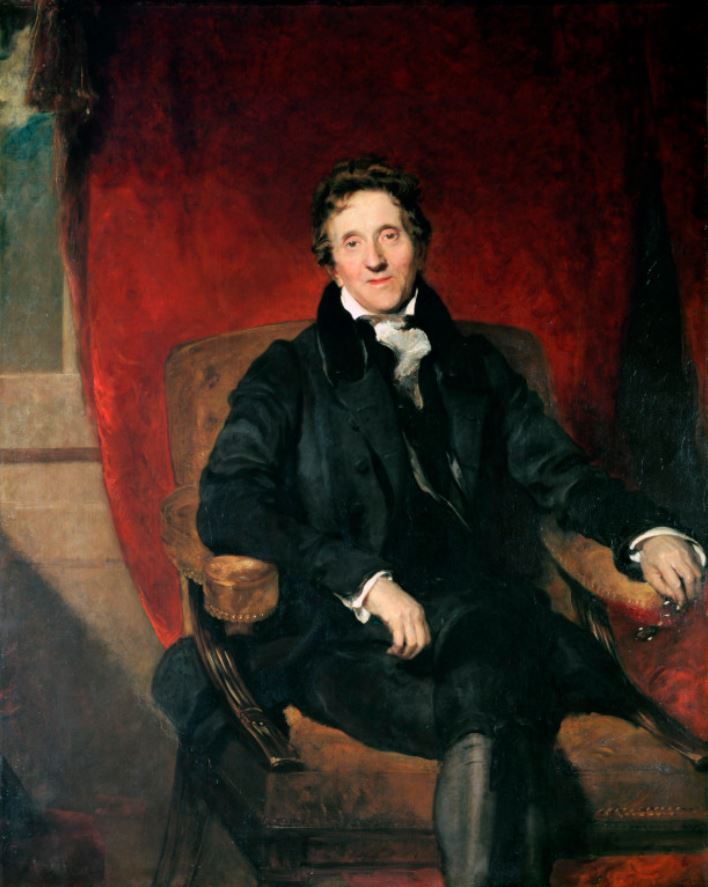
- Artist: Thomas Lawrence
- Year: 1829
- Type: Oil on canvas, portrait painting
- Dimensions: 139 cm × 110.5 cm (55 in × 43.5 in)
- Location: Sir John Soane's Museum, London

Portrait of John Soane is an 1829 portrait painting by the British artist Thomas Lawrence. It depicts the architect and classicist Sir John Soane. It was one of the final paintings produced by the artist before his death the following year.

== Sitter ==
Soane was the son of a bricklayer from Oxfordshire, and rose to become one of the most prominent British architects. He was known for his neoclassical designs. Buildings he was responsible include the Bank of England, Dulwich Picture Gallery as well as his own country house Pitzhanger Manor in Ealing.

== Painting ==
Lawrence depicts the veteran architect at the age of seventy six, wearing a curly-haired wig that was by then considerably out of fashion, and holding spectacles in his left hand. Lawrence was the premier portraitist of the Regency era and in 1820 had been elected as President of the Royal Academy.

The painting was commissioned by Soane himself, to hang in his residence opposite a much earlier portrait of himself by Joshua Reynolds. It was displayed at the Royal Academy Exhibition of 1829 at Somerset House in London. Today it remains part of the collection of Sir John Soane's Museum located in Lincoln's Inn Fields.

== Bibliography ==
- Levey, Michael. Sir Thomas Lawrence. Yale University Press, 2005.
