= Nelson Boarding the San Josef =

1829 painting by George Jones

- Artist: George Jones
- Year: 1829
- Type: Oil-on-canvas
- Dimensions: 162.5 cm × 223.5 cm (64.0 in × 88.0 in)
- Location: National Maritime Museum, Greenwich, London

Nelson Boarding the San Josef is an 1829 oil-on-canvas painting by the English artist George Jones.

== History and description ==
The painting depicts the boarding and capture of the Spanish ship of the line San José by the Royal Navy at the Battle of Cape St. Vincent on 14 February 1797. It emphasises the role played by Horatio Nelson, the future victor of the Battle of the Nile and Battle of Trafalgar.

It was one of four paintings commissioned by the British Institution for the sum of £500, to encourage British history painting and to be displayed at Greenwich Hospital. Jones, a former army officer and member of the Royal Academy, was known for his war paintings such as The Battle of Vittoria and The Battle of Waterloo (both 1822) which were bought by George IV for St James's Palace.

The work was displayed at the British Institution's annual exhibition in 1829. Richard Westall had previously painted a scene of Nelson taking the surrender of the San Nicolas shortly before the San Josef was boarded. Jones' painting is currently in the collection of the National Maritime Museum in Greenwich.

== Bibliography ==
- Cannadine, David. Admiral Lord Nelson: Context and Legacy. Palgrave Macmillan, 2005.
- Heuvel, Sean. The Trafalgar Chronicle Dedicated to Naval History in the Nelson Era. Pen and Sword,
- Tracy, Nicholas. Britannia’s Palette: The Arts of Naval Victory. McGill-Queen's Press, 2007.
