= Aspley House =

Country house in Aspley Guise, Bedfordshire, England

- Interactive map of the Aspley House area

General information
- Type: house
- Architectural style: Country house
- Location: Aspley Guise, Bedfordshire, United Kingdom
- Coordinates: 52.01527°N 0.62633°W
- Year built: 1690

Design and construction
- Designations: Grade II* listed

Aspley House is a Grade II* listed 17th-century country house near Aspley Guise in Bedfordshire, England.
