= The Confessional (painting) =

Painting by David Wilkie

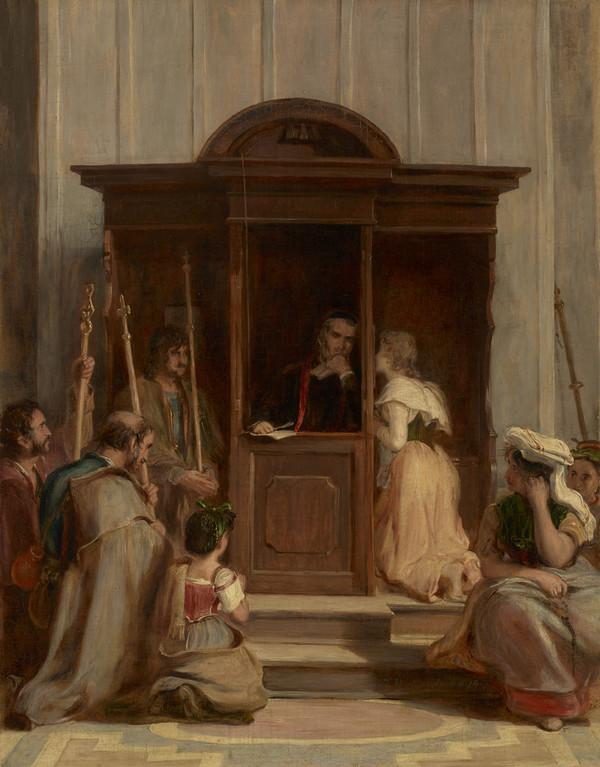
- Artist: David Wilkie
- Year: 1827
- Type: Oil on canvas, genre painting
- Dimensions: 48.2 cm × 36.8 cm (19.0 in × 14.5 in)
- Location: Scottish National Gallery, Edinburgh

The Confessional is an 1827 oil painting by the British artist David Wilkie. It depicts a Catholic Confessional as a young woman seeks penance. It was produced during a stay in Rome. Following a nervous breakdown, Wilkie abandoned painting for a period and travelled through Continental Europe where he began to produce new works again. On his return to London Wilkie submitted the painting to the Royal Academy Exhibition of 1829 held at Somerset House along with several other pictures inspired by his travels through Italy and Spain. Today it is in the collection of the Scottish National Gallery in Edinburgh, having been purchased in 1972.

== Bibliography ==
- Chiego, William Joseph. Sir David Wilkie of Scotland, 1785-1841. North Carolina Museum of Art, 1987.
- Clarke, Deborah & Remington, Vanessa. Scottish Artists 1750-1900: From Caledonia to the Continent. Royal Collection Trust, 2015.
- Tromans, Nicholas. David Wilkie: The People's Painter. Edinburgh University Press, 2007.
