= Confessionalism =

Confessionalism may refer to:

- Confessionalism (poetry)
- Confessionalism (politics)
- Confessionalism (religion)
