= Ulysses Deriding Polyphemus =

Painting by J. M. W. Turner

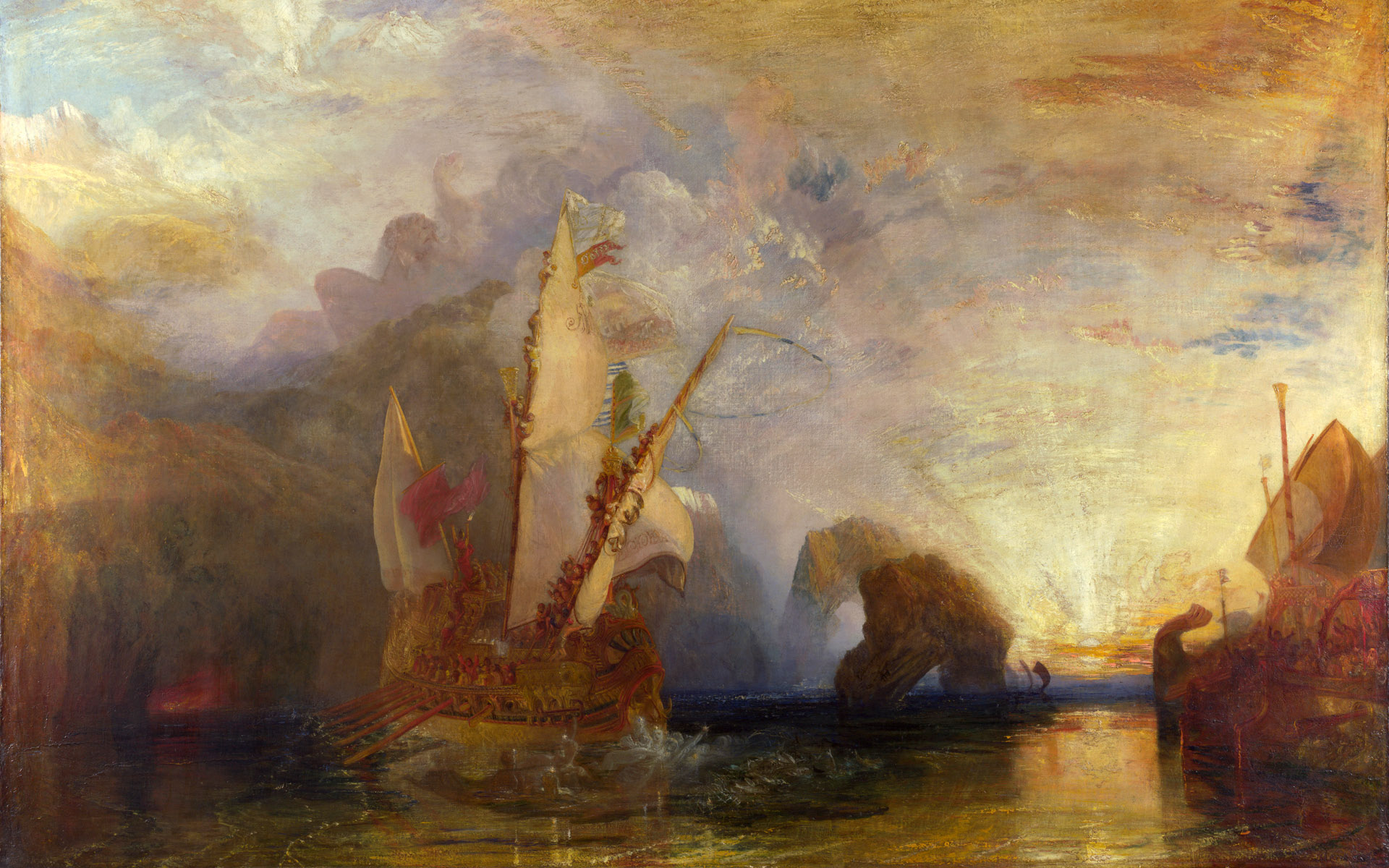
- Artist: J. M. W. Turner
- Year: 1829
- Medium: Oil on canvas
- Dimensions: 132.7 cm × 203 cm (52.2 in × 80 in)
- Location: National Gallery, London
- Accession: NG508
- Website: nationalgallery.org.uk/...odyssey

Ulysses Deriding Polyphemus is an 1829 oil painting by Joseph Mallord William Turner. It depicts a scene from Homer's Odyssey, showing Odysseus (Ulysses) standing on his ship deriding Polyphemus, one of the cyclopes he encounters and has recently blinded, who is disguised behind one of the mountains on the left side. Additional details include the Trojan Horse, a scene from Virgil's Aeneid, on one of the flags and the horses of Apollo rising above the horizon. This painting is thought to be quickly done as a replacement for previous paintings submitted to the academy that had been delayed. The painting was exhibited at the Royal Academy Exhibition of 1829 at Somerset House and acquired by the National Gallery in 1856.

== See also ==
- List of paintings by J. M. W. Turner
