= 1827 in art =

Events in the year 1827 in Art.

== Events ==
- 7 May – The Royal Academy Exhibition of 1827 opens at Somerset House in London
- Sir Richard Westmacott becomes Professor of Sculpture at the Royal Academy.
- John James Audubon begins publication of The Birds of America in the United Kingdom. Much of the background botanical artwork is by Joseph Mason.
- English painter Benjamin Haydon is committed to debtors' prison in London; while there he witnesses the mock election in the King's Bench Prison and records it in the paintings The Mock Election and Chairing the Member.
- Charles Codman is discovered by art critic and patron John Neal.

== Works ==
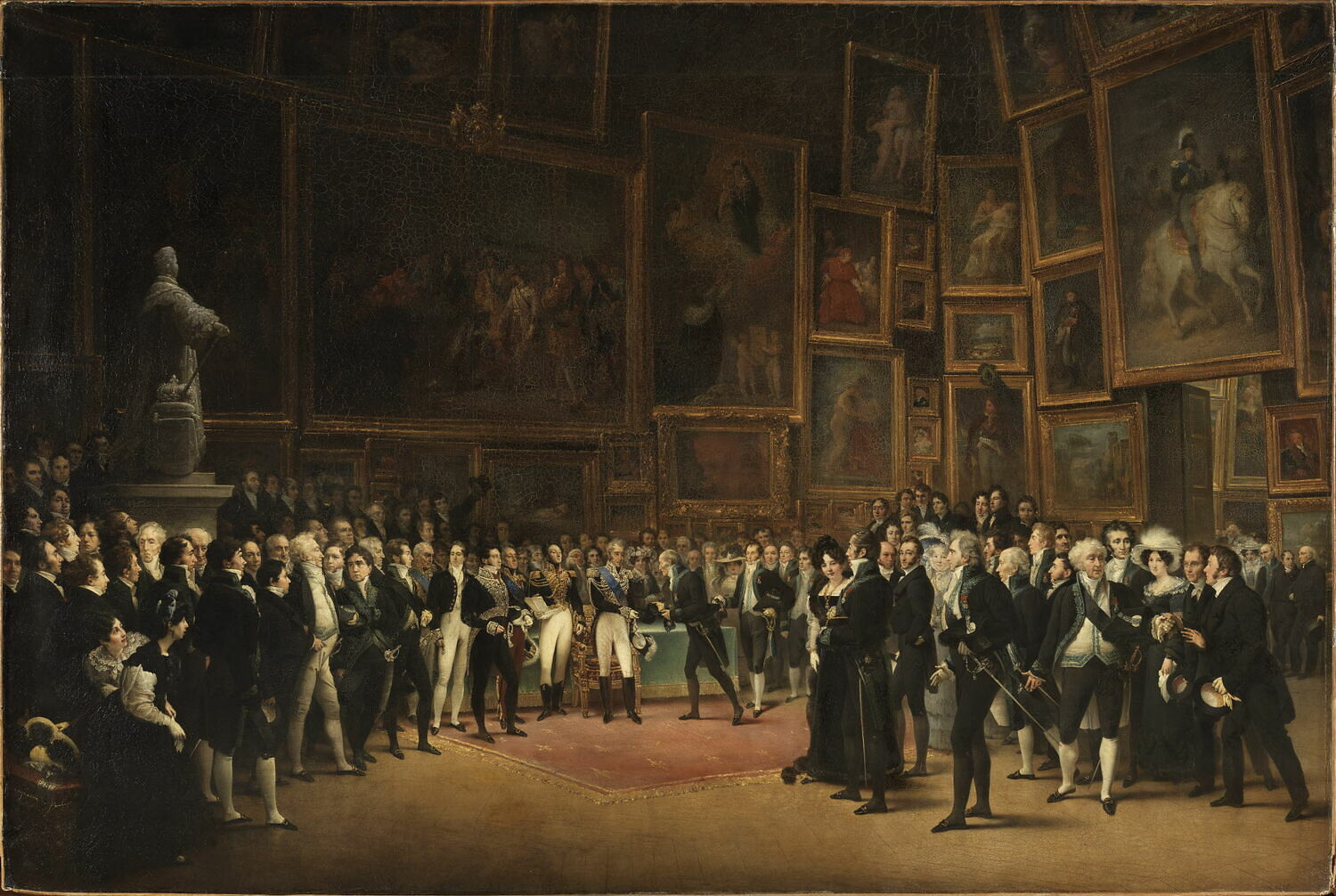
François Joseph Heim – Charles X Distributing Awards to Artists

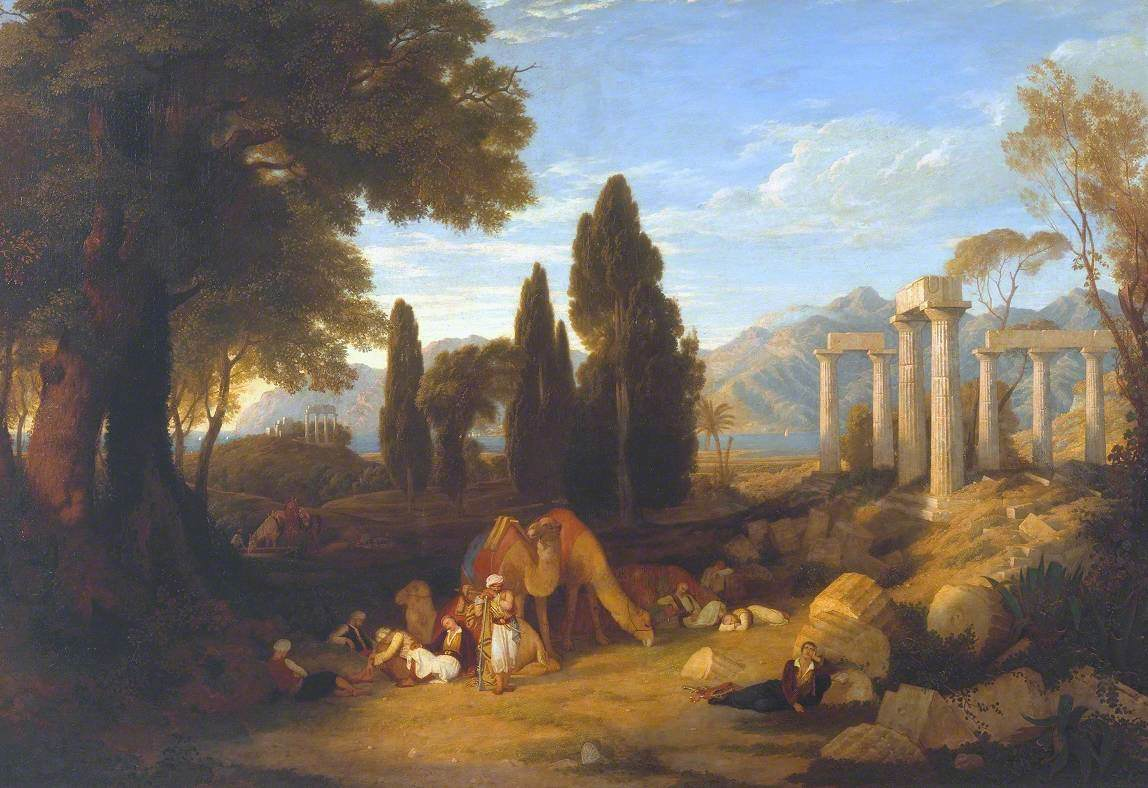
Charles Lock Eastlake – Lord Byron's Dream

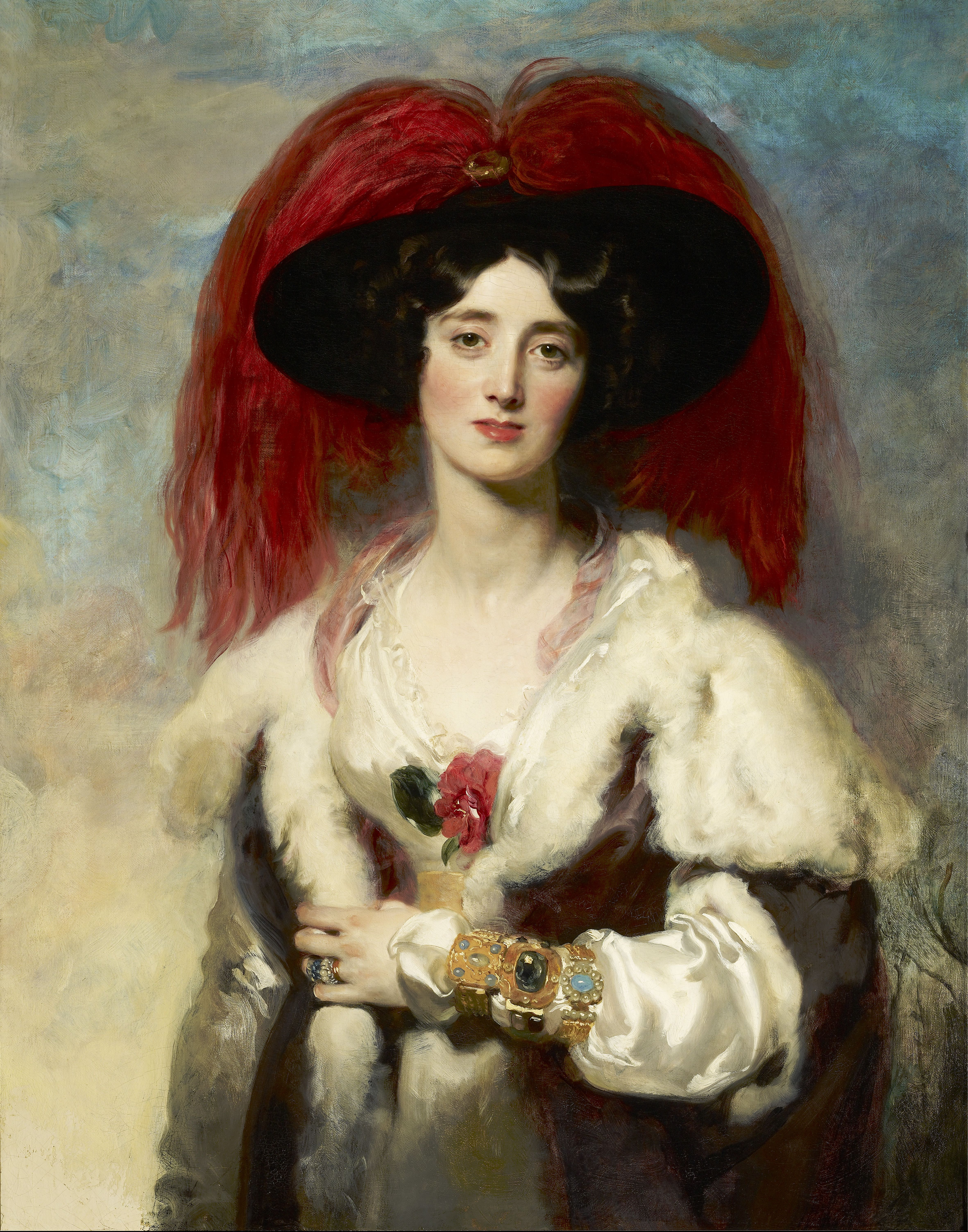
Thomas Lawrence – Portrait of Julia, Lady Peel.

- William Blake – The Wood of the Self-Murderers: The Harpies and the Suicides
- Richard Parkes Bonington – Henri III and the English Ambassador
- Henry Perronet Briggs
  - The First Interview Between the Spaniards and the Peruvians
  - Juliet and Her Nurse
- Karl Briullov – Italian Midday
- Augustus Wall Callcott – Dead Calm
- Thomas Campbell
  - Bust of Henry Raeburn
  - Monument to the Duchess of Buccleuch in St Edmund's church, Warkton (England)
- George Catlin – Bird's Eye View of Niagara Falls
- Thomas Cole – Autumn in the Catskills
- William Collins – A Frost Scene
- John Constable
  - Chain Pier, Brighton
  - Vale of Health, Hampstead
- Eugène Delacroix
  - Combat of the Giaour and the Pasha
  - Death of Sardanapalus
  - Still Life with Lobsters
- Charles Lock Eastlake
  - Lord Byron's Dream
  - Pilgrims Arriving in Sight of Rome
- Jean-François Garneray – The grand Dauphin visits a hut, led by the Duc de Montausier
- François Gérard - The Coronation of Charles X
- Francisco Goya (attributed) – The Milkmaid of Bordeaux
- Benjamin Robert Haydon – The Mock Election
- Francesco Hayez – Bathsheba
- François Joseph Heim – Charles X Distributing Awards to Artists
- Hokusai – wood-block print series (1827–1830)
  - A Tour of the Waterfalls of the Provinces
  - Unusual Views of Celebrated Bridges in the Provinces
- Jean Auguste Dominique Ingres – The Apotheosis of Homer
- George Jones – Banquet in the Thames Tunnel
- Orest Kiprensky – Portrait of Alexander Pushkin
- Edwin Landseer
  - A Scene at Abbotsford
  - The Monkey Who Had Seen the World
- Thomas Lawrence
  - Portrait of the Duke of Clarence
  - Portrait of Julia, Lady Peel
  - Portrait of Rosamond Croker
- Patrick Nasmyth – View of Bristol
- François Rude – Mercury fastening his sandals after having killed Argos (model for bronze casting)
- Ary Scheffer – The Women of Souli
- John Simpson – The Captive Slave
- J.M.W. Turner
  - Rembrandt's Daughter
  - Scene in Derbyshire
- Horace Vernet
  - The Battle of Bouvines
  - Edith Recovering Harold's Body after the Battle of Hastings
- David Wilkie – I Pifferari

== Births ==
- February 13 – Frederick Daniel Hardy, English genre painter and member of the Cranbrook Colony (died 1911)
- April 2 – William Holman Hunt, English pre-Raphaelite painter (died 1910)
- May 1
  - Agnes Börjesson, Swedish painter (died 1900)
  - August Cappelen, Norwegian painter (died 1852)
- May 11 – Jean-Baptiste Carpeaux, French painter and sculptor (died 1875)
- June 21 – Vincenzo Cabianca, Italian painter (died 1902)
- October 19 – Charles Cordier, French sculptor (died 1905)
- Thomas Farrell, Irish sculptor (died 1900)
- Emma Schenson, Swedish photographer (died 1913)

== Deaths ==
- February 22 – Charles Willson Peale, American painter (born 1741)
- March 25 – Pierre-Antoine Bellangé, French ébéniste (born 1757)
- April 21 – Thomas Rowlandson, English artist and caricaturist (born 1757)
- May 6 – François-Frédéric Lemot, French sculptor (born 1772)
- August 12 – William Blake, English painter, poet and engraver (born 1757)
- December 23 – John Higton, English painter primarily of animals (born 1776)
- date unknown
  - Féréol Bonnemaison, French portrait painter and lithographer
  - Allen Robert Branston, English wood-engraver (born 1778)
