= Portrait of Sir Walter Scott =

1826 painting by Thomas Lawrence

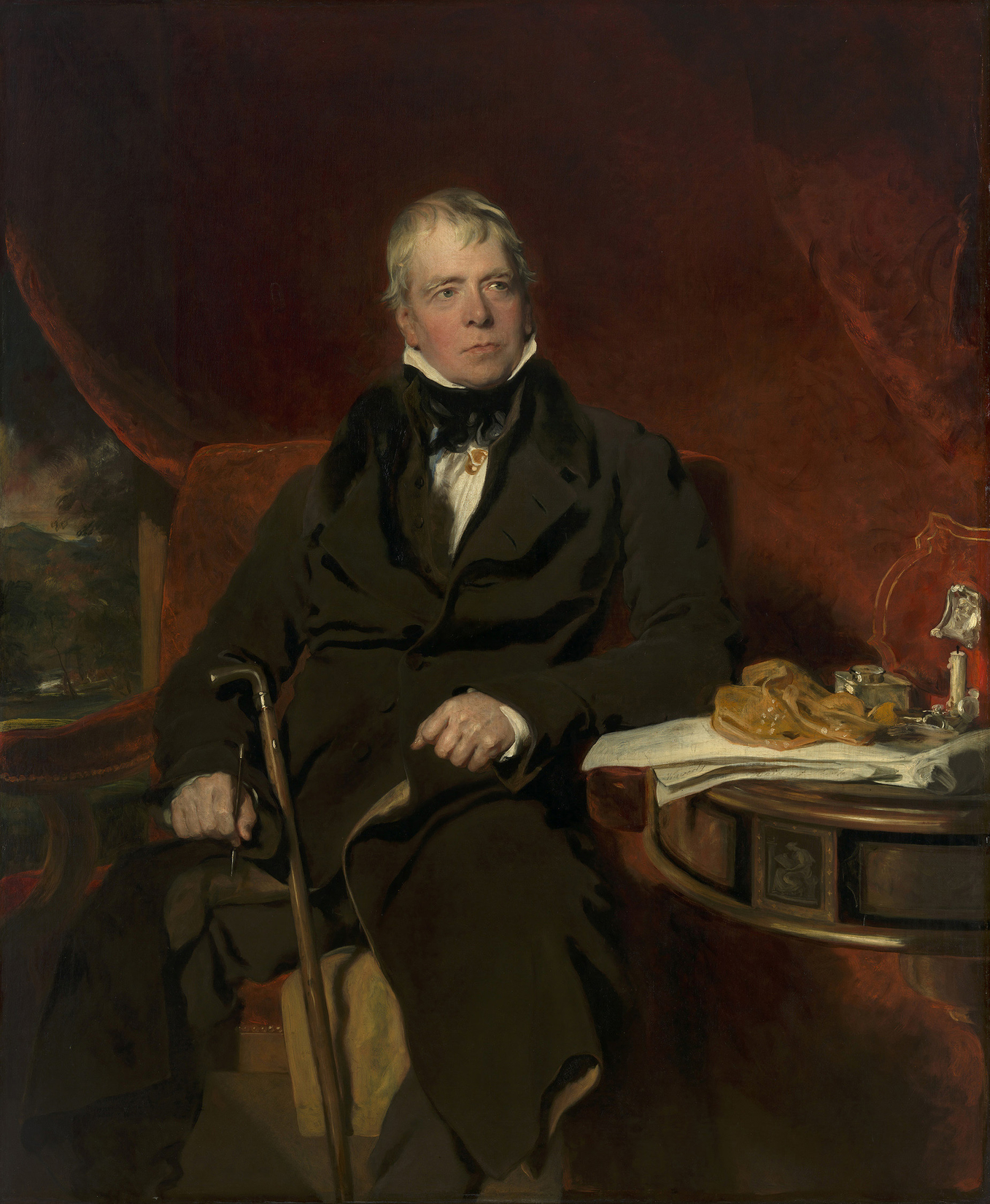
- Artist: Thomas Lawrence
- Year: 1826
- Type: Oil on canvas, portrait
- Dimensions: 162 cm × 133 cm (63.6 in × 52.3 in)
- Location: Royal Collection, United Kingdom

Sir Walter Scott is a portrait painting by the English artist Thomas Lawrence of the Scottish writer Sir Walter Scott. Begun in 1820, it was completed in 1826 and exhibited at the Royal Academy's Summer Exhibition of 1827. Lawrence was Britain's foremost society portraitist of the Regency era and was commissioned by George IV, a regular patron of the artist for whom he supplied various paintings for the Waterloo Chamber, to depict Scott for a fee of three hundred guineas.

== History and description ==
Walter Scott was Britain's most famous living writer when he was depicted. At the height of his career with his Waverley novels celebrated across Europe and America, his popular romantic historical fiction, including Ivanhoe and Rob Roy was influential across the arts. Also a leading antiquarian, he played a key role in the organising of George IV's Visit to Scotland in 1822 having rediscovered the Crown Jewels of Scotland four years earlier. Lawrence depicts him as an author holding a pen in his right hand with writing material on the desk to his left. It was acclaimed by the reviewer in the Morning Post who praised the portrait's "truth to nature".

Lawrence's painting may have originally been intended to hang at Carlton House, in London, the King's primary residence when he came to the throne. Today the work remains part of the Royal Collection. It was also soon afterwards turned into a mezzotint print, a copy of which is held National Portrait Gallery. Scottish painter Henry Raeburn also depicted Scott in the early 1820s.

== See also ==
- Portrait of Sir Walter Scott, an 1823 painting by Henry Raeburn

== Bibliography ==
- Levey, Michael. Sir Thomas Lawrence. Yale University Press, 2005.
