= Portrait of Rosamond Croker =

1827 painting by Thomas Lawrence

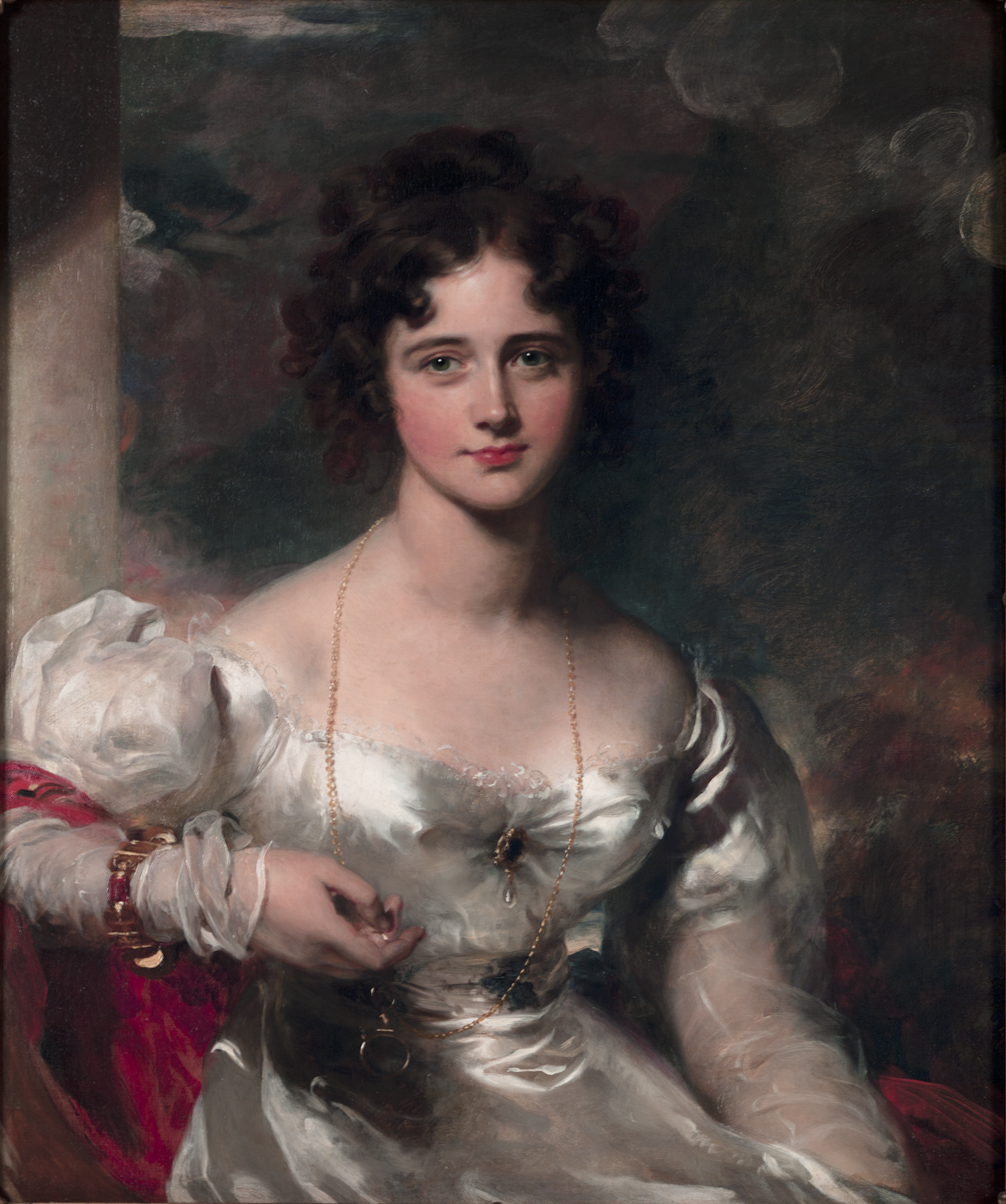
- Artist: Thomas Lawrence
- Year: 1827
- Type: Oil on canvas, portrait painting
- Dimensions: 81.3 cm × 63.5 cm (32.0 in × 25.0 in)
- Location: Albright–Knox Art Gallery, Buffalo

Portrait of Rosamond Croker is an 1827 portrait painting by the British artist Thomas Lawrence depicting Rosamond Croker, the adopted daughter of the Anglo-Irish politician and writer John Wilson Croker. She later married the civil servant Sir George Barrow. Lawrence served as President of the Royal Academy from 1820 and 1830 and was known for his stylish, Romantic portrayals of the Regency elite.

The painting was displayed at the Royal Academy Exhibition of 1827 held at Somerset House in London along with his Portrait of Julia, Lady Peel. Michael Levey described both works as "masterpieces", noting that at the time the Croker painting attracted "even more admiration and praise". Today it is in the collection of Albright–Knox Art Gallery in Buffalo, having been acquired in 1945. A mezzotint based on the picture was produced by Samuel Cousins in 1828.

== Bibliography ==
- Albinson, Cassandra, Funnell, Peter & Peltz, Lucy. Thomas Lawrence: Regency Power and Brilliance. Yale University Press, 2010.
- Levey, Michael. Sir Thomas Lawrence. Yale University Press, 2005.
