= The Day's Sport =

Painting by James Ward

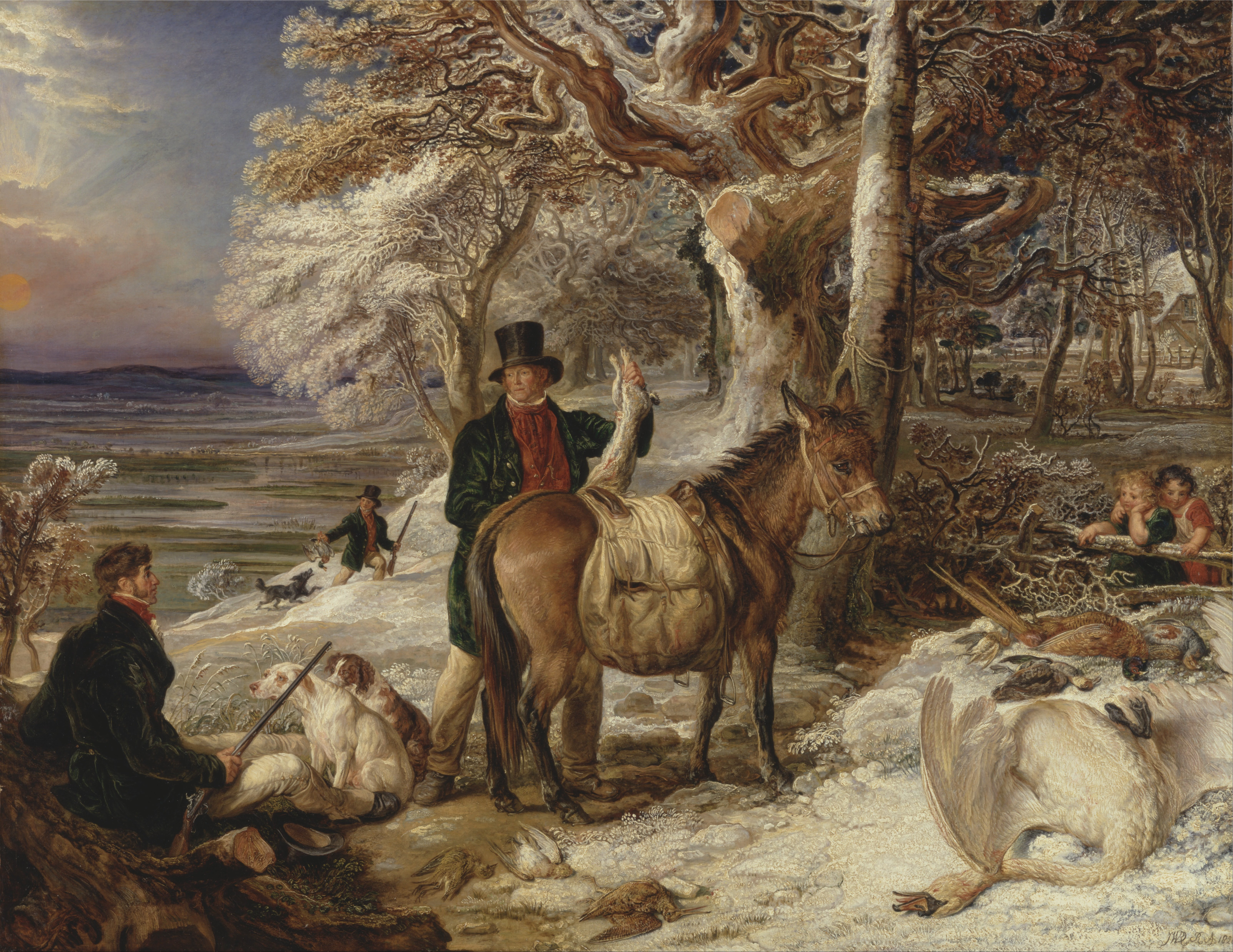
- Artist: James Ward
- Year: 1826
- Type: Oil on canvas, genre painting
- Dimensions: 100.3 cm × 130.2 cm (39.5 in × 51.3 in)
- Location: Yale Center for British Art, New Haven

The Day's Sport is an oil painting on canvas by the British artist James Ward, from 1826. It combines elements of traditional Dutch genre painting with the more recent British interest in sporting pictures showing hunting scenes. It features a view on a wintry day. However, it possibly suggests Ward's disapproval of the near indiscriminate slaughter of animals, particularly birds by the hunting party.

The picture was displayed at the Royal Academy Exhibition of 1827 held at Somerset House in London. It is now in the Yale Center for British Art in New aven as part of the Paul Mellon Collection.

== Bibliography ==
- Beckett, Oliver. The Life and Work of James Ward, R.A., 1769-1859: The Forgotten Genius. Book Guild, 1995.
- Colls, Robert. This Sporting Life: Sport and Liberty in England, 1760-1960. Oxford University Press, 2020.
- Fussell, George Edwin. James Ward R.A.: Animal Painter, 1769-1859, and His England. Michael Joseph, 1974.
- Walker, Stella A. Sporting Art: England 1700-1900. Studio Vista, 1972.
