= Portrait of Sir Walter Scott (Raeburn) =

1823 painting by Thomas Lawrence

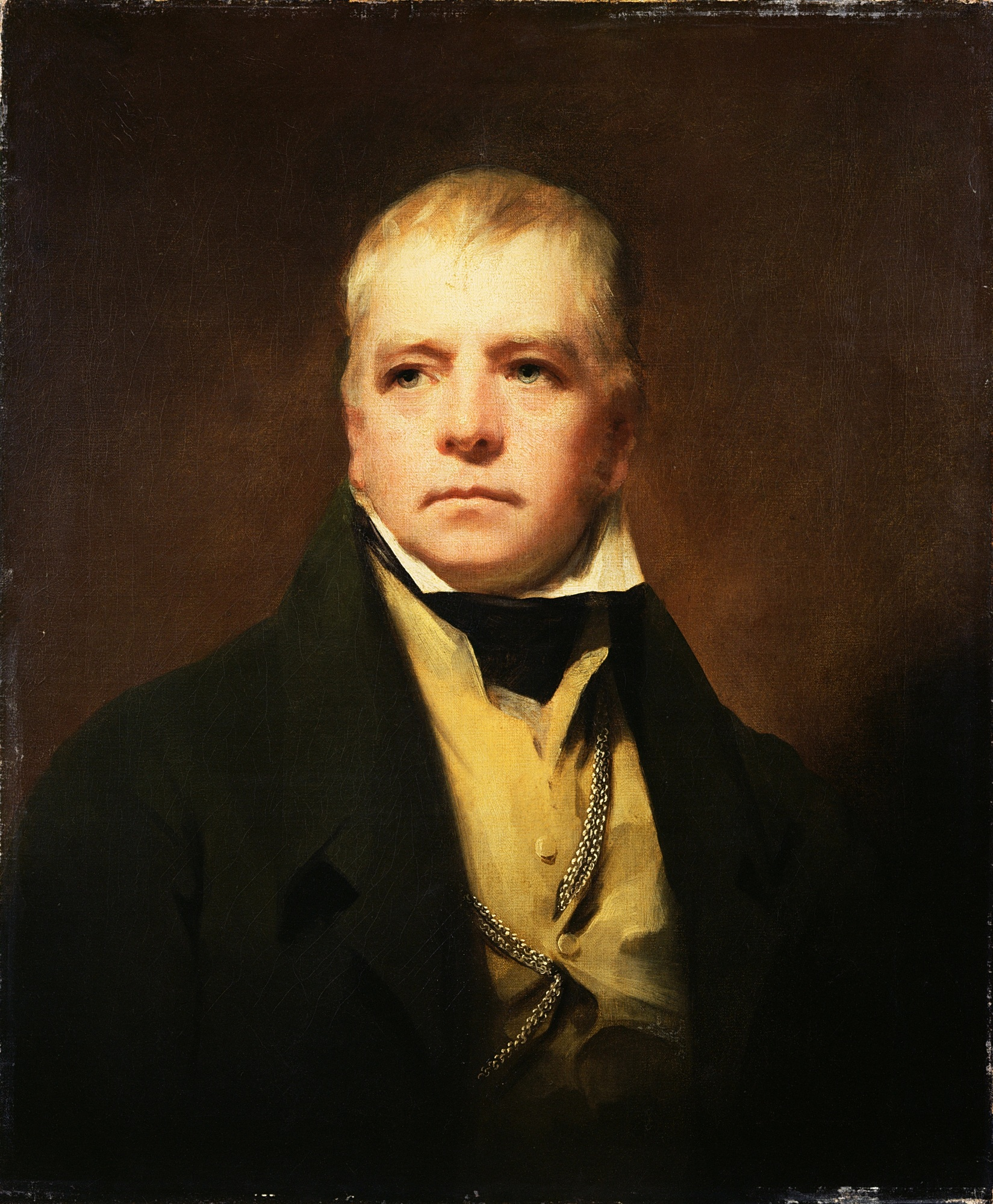
- Artist: Henry Raeburn
- Year: 1823
- Type: Oil on canvas, portrait painting
- Dimensions: 76.2 cm × 63.5 cm (30.0 in × 25.0 in)
- Location: Scottish National Portrait Gallery; Edinburgh

Portrait of Sir Walter Scott is an 1823 portrait painting by the British artist Henry Raeburn. It depicts the novelist and poet Sir Walter Scott, a leading figure of the Romantic era. Raeburn was the most prominent Scottish portraitists of the Regency Era.

Produced when Scott was at the height of his fame, it was one of the last pictures Raeburn produced before his death. Today the painting is in the collection of the Scottish National Portrait Gallery in Edinburgh, having been purchased with the support of the Art Fund in 1935.

Since 2021 the image has been used for the Scottish five pound banknote.

== See also ==
- Portrait of Sir Walter Scott, an 1826 painting by the English artist Thomas Lawrence

== Bibliography ==
- Bray, Joe. The Portrait in Fiction of the Romantic Period. Taylor & Francis, 2016.
- Coltman, Viccy. Henry Raeburn: Context, Reception and Reputation. Edinburgh University Press, 2018.
