= The Monkey Who Had Seen the World =

Painting by Edwin Landseer

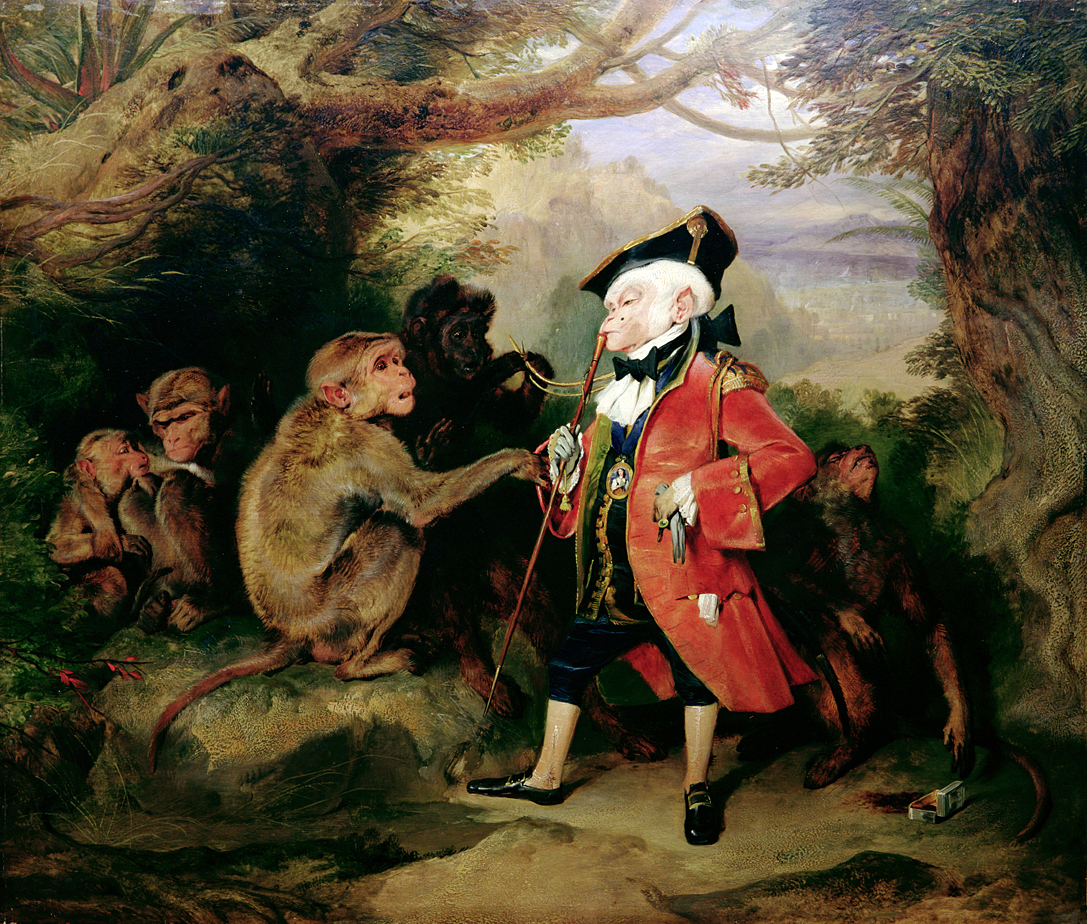
- Artist: Edwin Landseer
- Year: 1827
- Type: Oil on panel, genre painting
- Dimensions: 47 cm × 54.6 cm (19 in × 21.5 in)
- Location: Guildhall Art Gallery, London

The Monkey Who Had Seen the World is an 1827 genre painting by the British artist Edwin Landseer. It was inspired by a fable by the 18th-century English writer John Gay. It was one of a number of subjects by Landseer featuring anthropomorphic monkeys to illustrate human traits such as cunning, flattery and cruelty. He portrays the well-travelled in the costume of a roccoco era dandy.

The painting was displayed at the Royal Academy's Summer Exhibition of 1827 at Somerset House in London, where it was generally praised by critics. Today it is in the collection of the Guildhall Art Gallery in the City of London.

== Bibliography ==
- Bourke, Joanna. What It Means to be Human: Historical Reflections from the 1800s to the Present.
- Donald, Diana. Picturing Animals in Britain, 1750-1850. Yale University Press, 2007.
- Ormond, Richard. Sir Edwin Landseer. Philadelphia Museum of Art, 1981.
