= Rembrandt's Daughter =

Painting by J. M. W. Turner

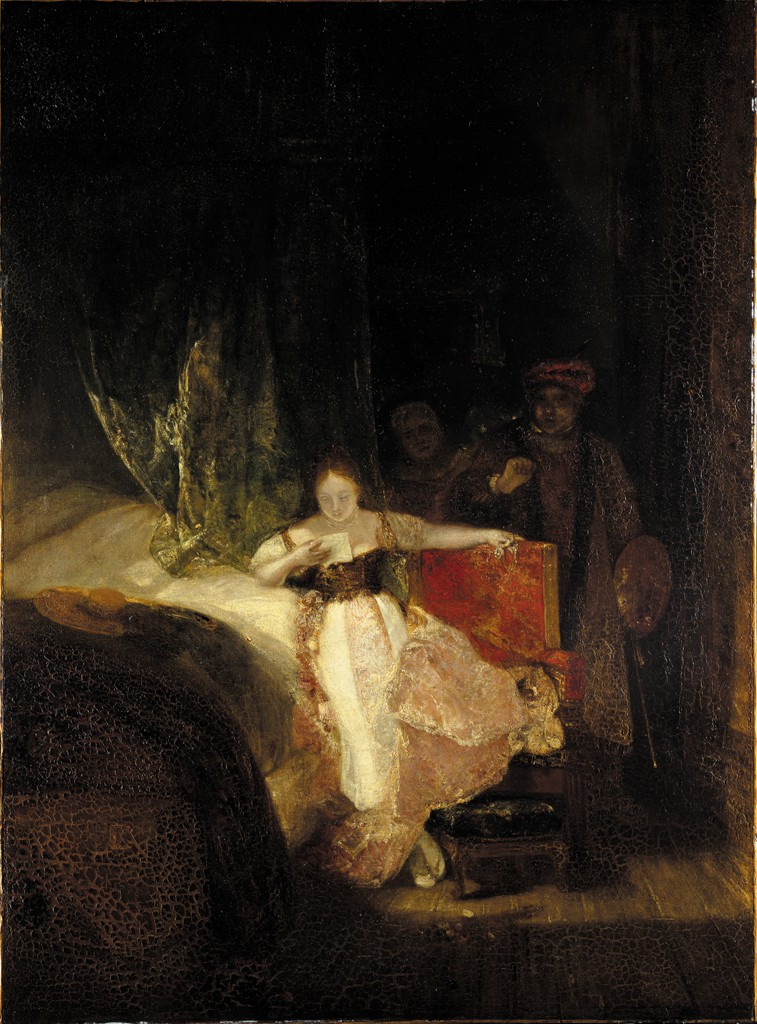
- Artist: J. M. W. Turner
- Year: 1827
- Type: Oil on canvas, genre painting
- Dimensions: 159.4 cm × 127 cm (62.8 in × 50 in)
- Location: Fogg Museum, Massachusetts

Rembrandt's Daughter is an 1827 historical genre painting by the British artist J.M.W. Turner. It portrays a daughter of the seventeenth century Dutch Old Master painter Rembrandt. It shows the daughter, being interrupted while reading a letter by her father. When Turner produced the painting, the existence of Rembrtandt's daughter Cornelia van Rijn was not known and the idea for the painting was drawn from Turner's own imagination, possibly reflecting on his own relationship with his daughters. Turner was interested by the works of Rembrandt, which he was able to view in the collections of wealthy patrons.

The painting was displayed at the Royal Academy Exhibition of 1827 at Somerset House in London. It was hung near a portrait by Martin Archer Shee, outshining it with the bright red that Turner added to it on "varnishing day" before the exhibition opened. However the quality of the paint, possibly due to these last-minute additions, began to fade over the following years. Critical reception at the exhibition was generally negative with Henry Colburn's New Monthly Magazine describing it as a "joke upon Rembrandt and upon the taste of his admirers". Today it is in the collection of the Fogg Museum in Massachusetts, having been acquired in 1917.

== See also ==
- List of paintings by J. M. W. Turner
- List of works about Rembrandt

== Bibliography ==
- Bailey, Anthony. J.M.W. Turner: Standing in the Sun. Tate Enterprises Ltd, 2013.
- Casaliggi, Carmen. John Ruskin, J.M.W. Turner and the Art of Water. Cambridge Scholars Publishing, 2022.
- Moyle, Franny. Turner: The Extraordinary Life and Momentous Times of J. M. W. Turner. Penguin Books, 2016.
- Reynolds, Graham. Turner. Thames & Hudson, 2022.
- Solkin, David. Turner and the Masters. Tate Britain, 2009.
