= Royal Academy Exhibition of 1827 =

1827 art exhibition in London

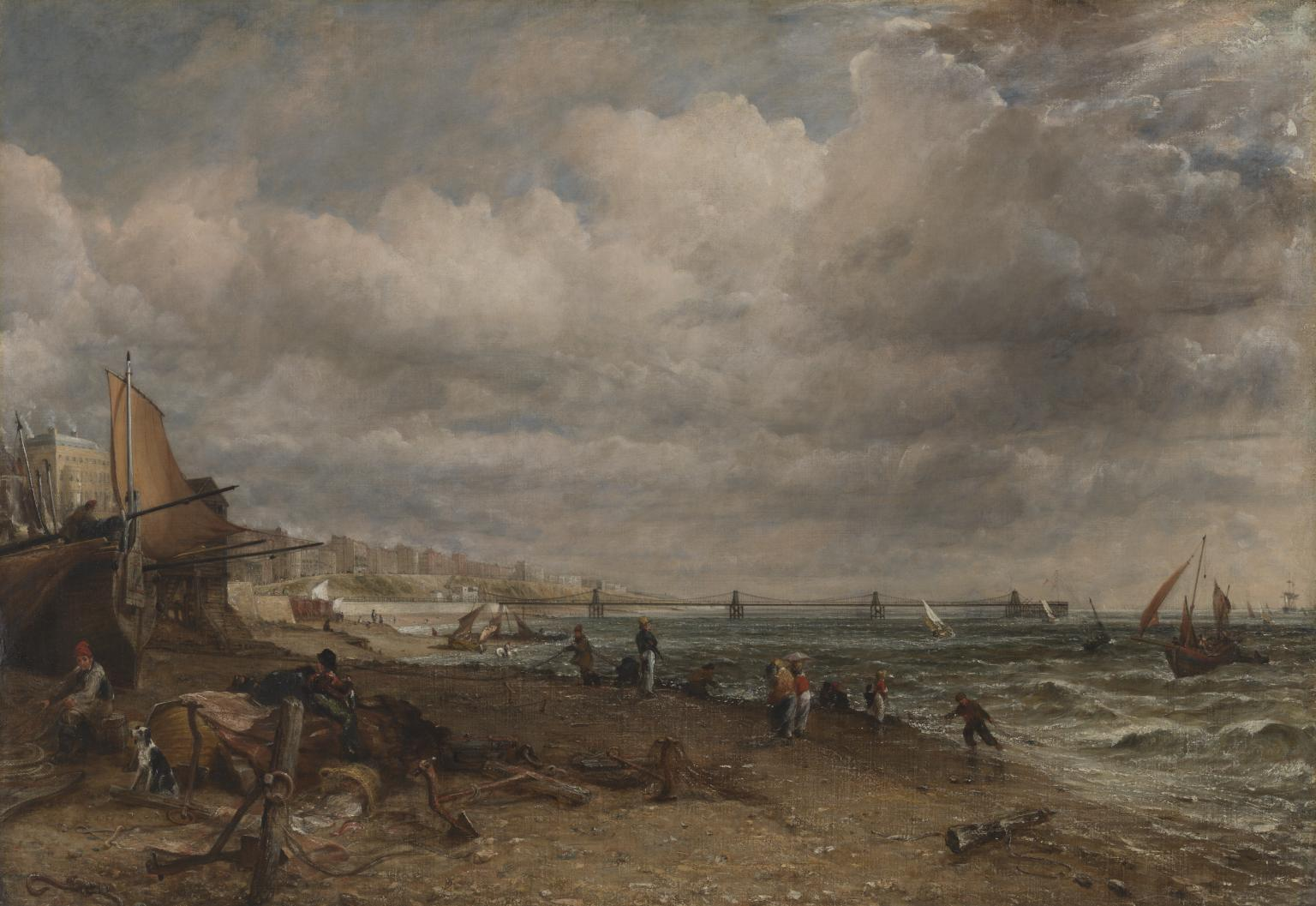
Chain Pier, Brighton by John Constable

The Royal Academy Exhibition of 1827 was an art exhibition held by the British Royal Academy of Arts during the Regency era. The fifty ninth annual Summer Exhibition of the academy, it was staged at Somerset House in London between 7 May and 14 July 1827.

The President of the Royal Academy Thomas Lawrence exhibited a series of portrait paintings capturing prominent figures of the late Regency era. These included the Prime Minister Lord Liverpool and the Scottish writer Walter Scott. Two featuring female sitters Portrait of Julia, Lady Peel and Portrait of Rosamond Croker were widely praised and have been described as "masterpieces". His rival John Jackson showed a full-length portrait of the soldier and politician the Duke of Wellington.

John Constable sent in three landscape paintings these included his Parham Mill and a view of Hampstead Heath. The largest of these works was his Chain Pier, Brighton, featuring the recently opened landmark. The painting was the major production of his visit to Brighton on the Sussex coast for his wife's health.

One of the rising stars of British art, the animal painter Edwin Landseer exhibited works including The Monkey Who Had Seen the World. The York-born William Etty displayed The Parting of Hero and Leander.

== Gallery ==
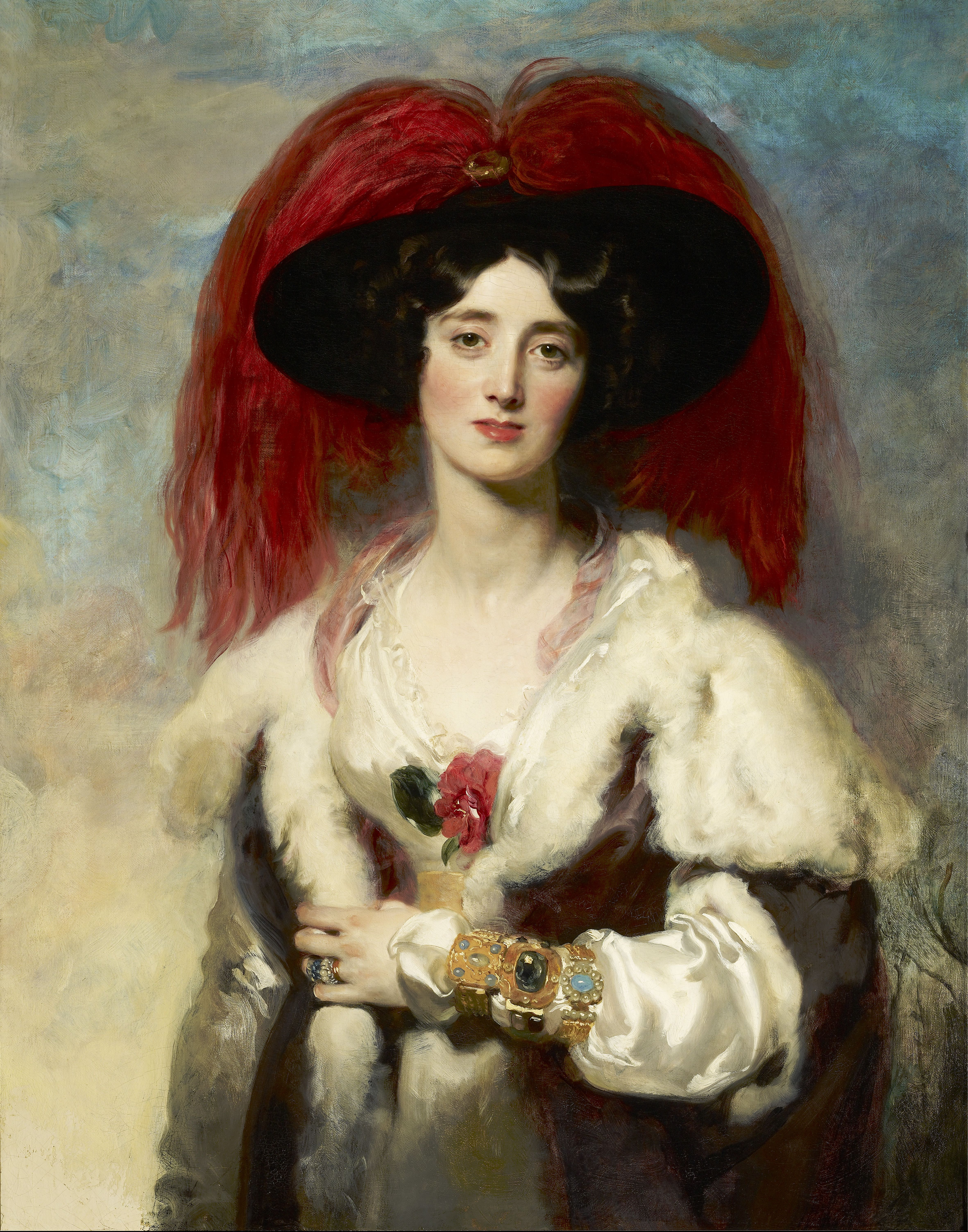
Portrait of Julia, Lady Peel by Thomas Lawrence

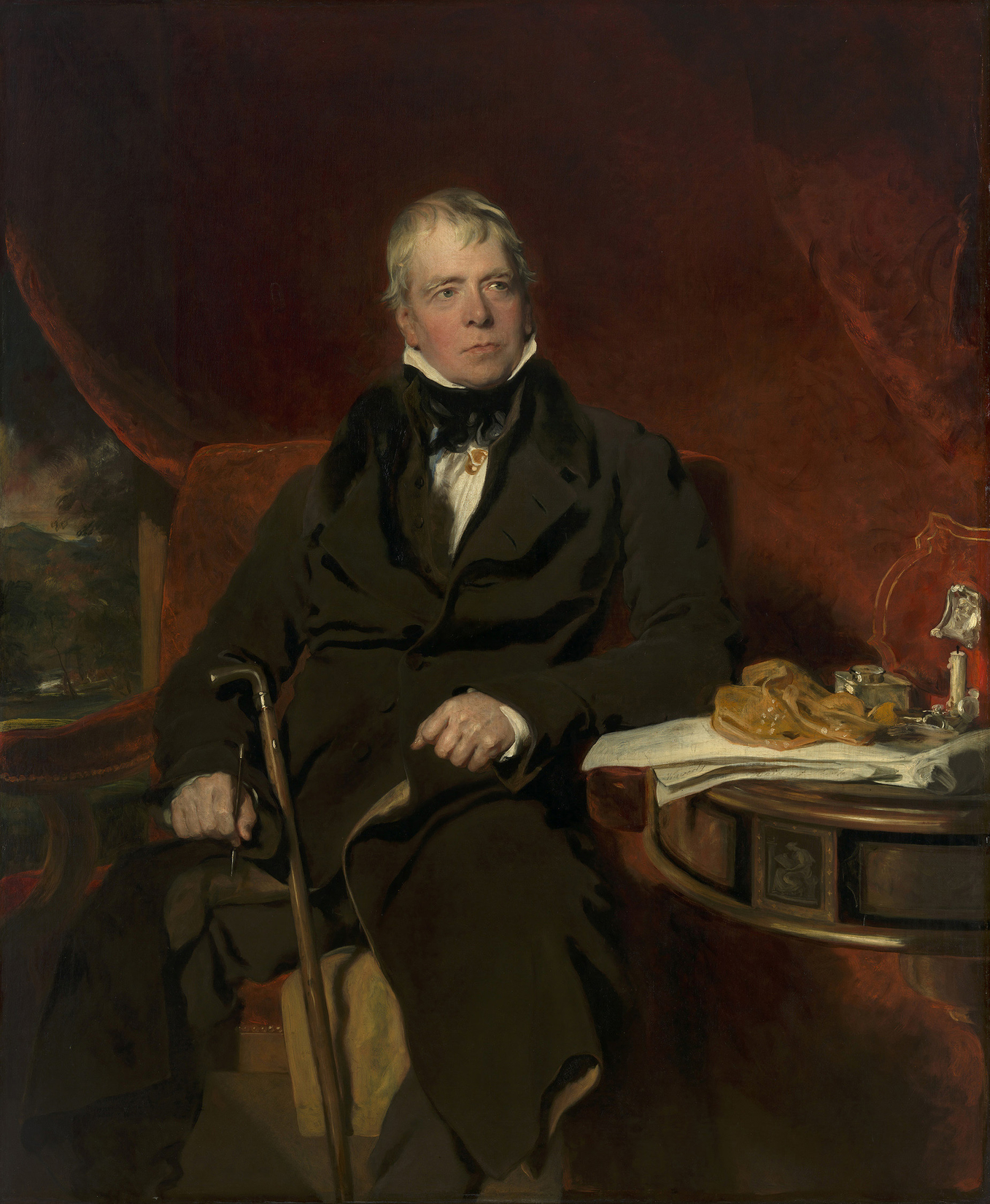
Portrait of Sir Walter Scott by Thomas Lawrence

Portrait of Lord Liverpool by Thomas Lawrence

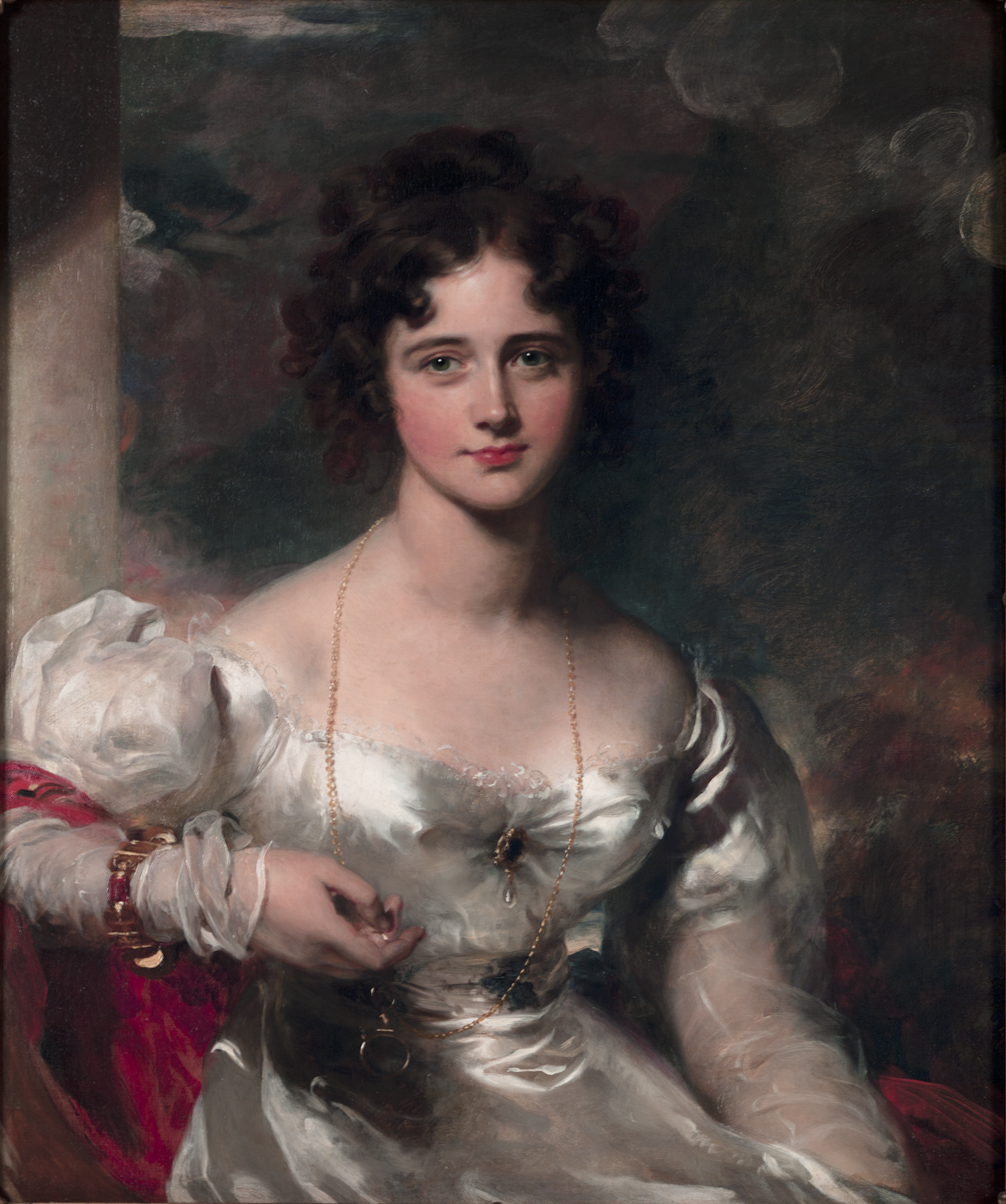
Portrait of Rosamond Croker by Thomas Lawrence

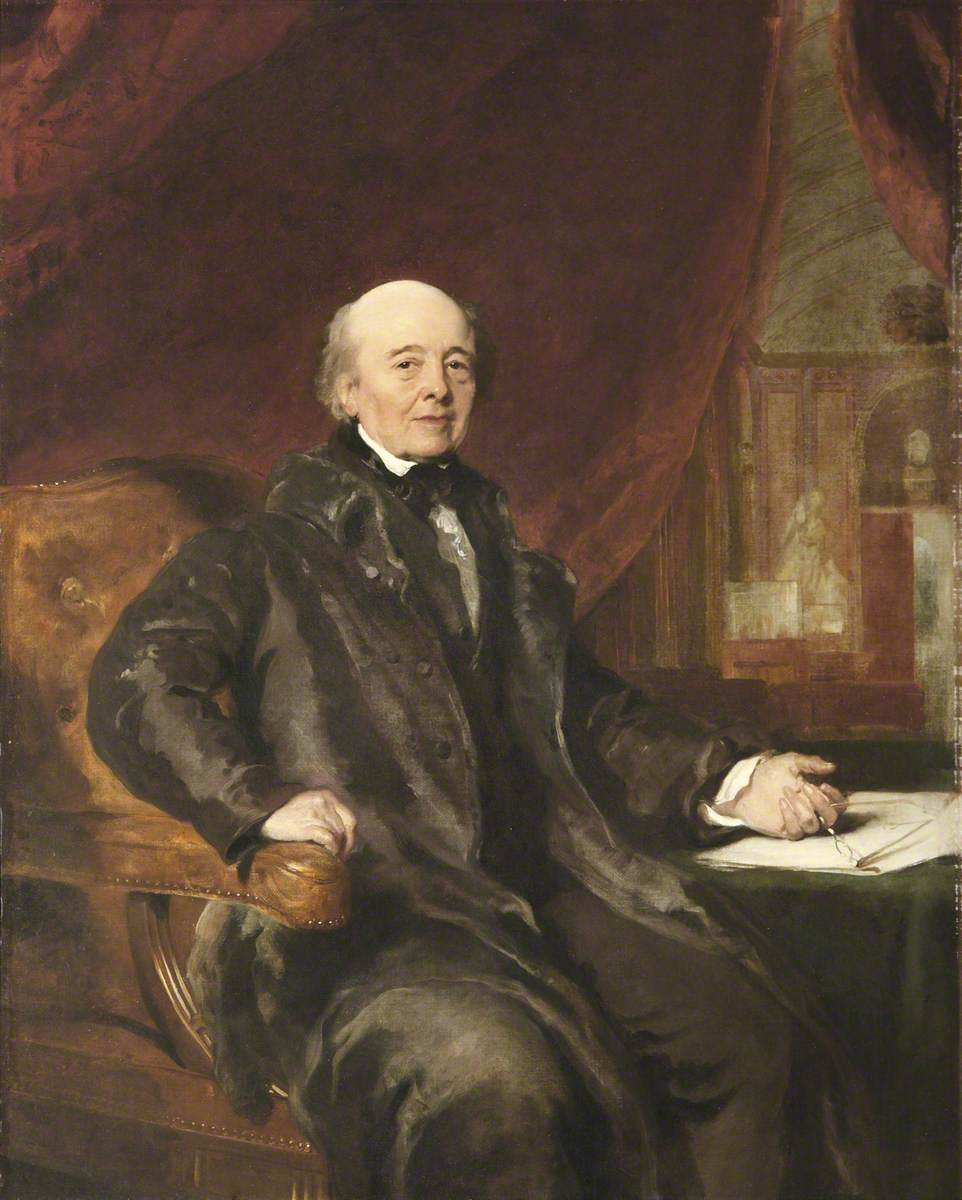
Portrait of John Nash by Thomas Lawrence

Lillian by William Beechey

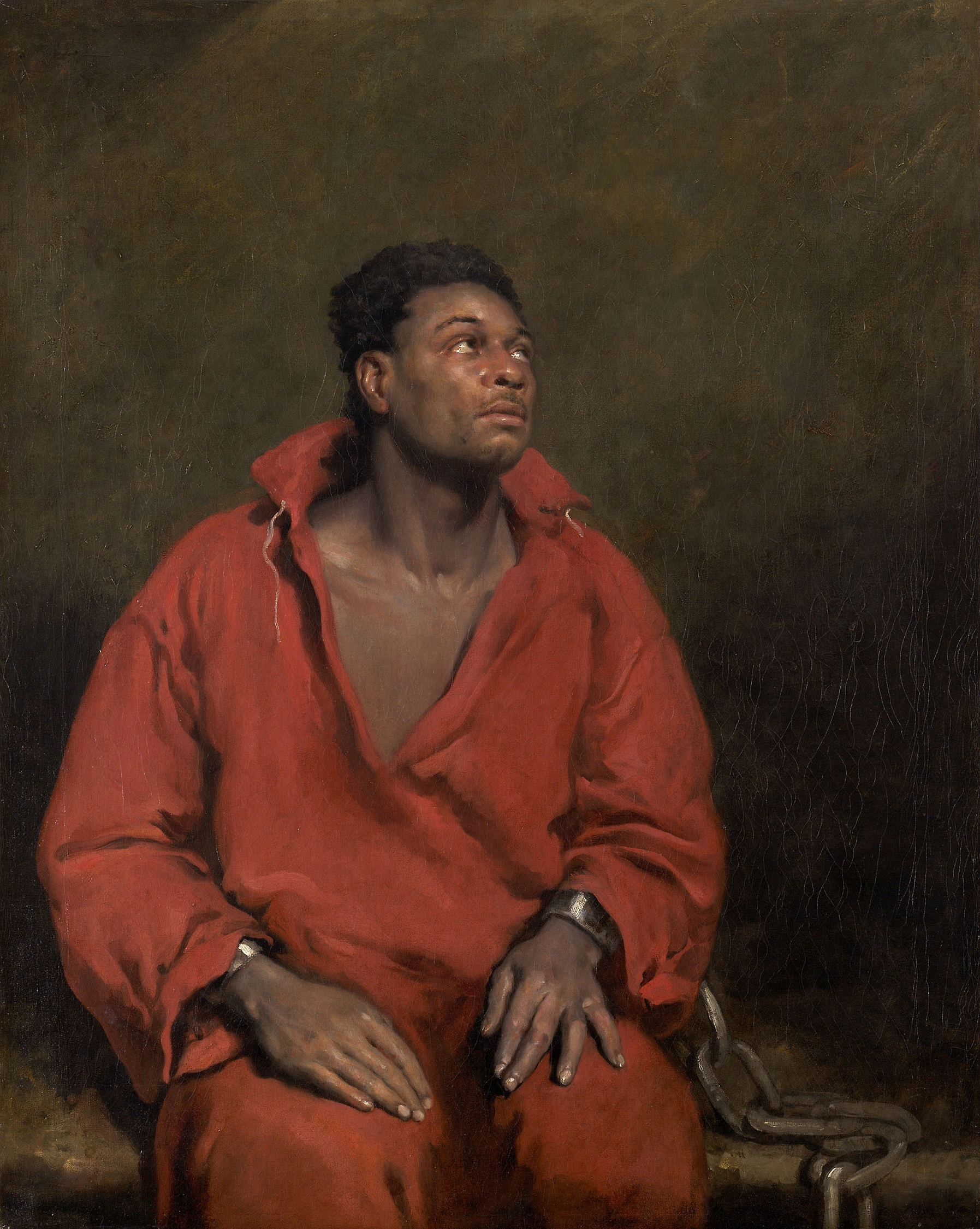
The Captive Slave by John Simpson

Vale of Health, Hampstead by John Constable

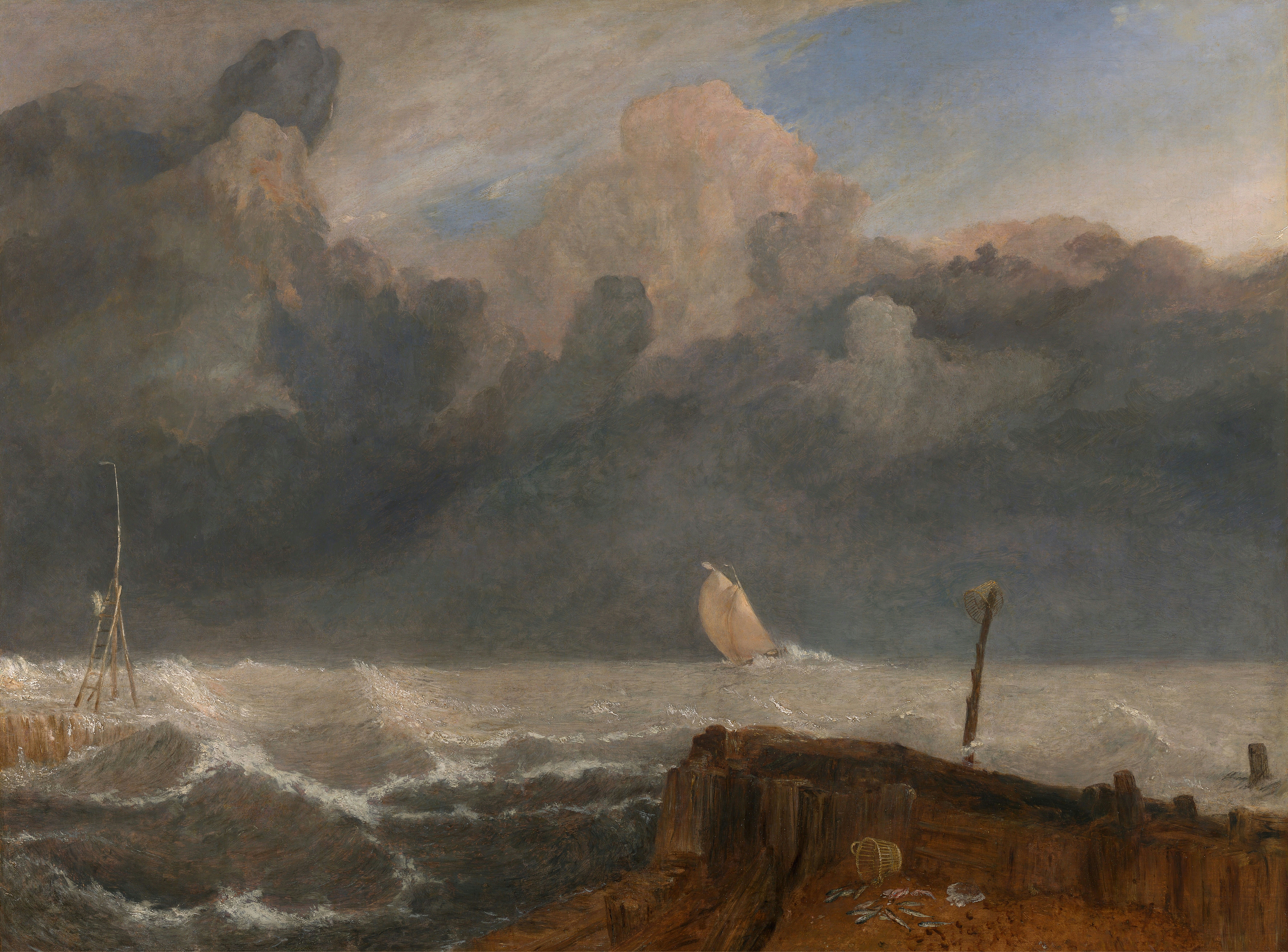
Port Ruysdael by J.M.W. Turner

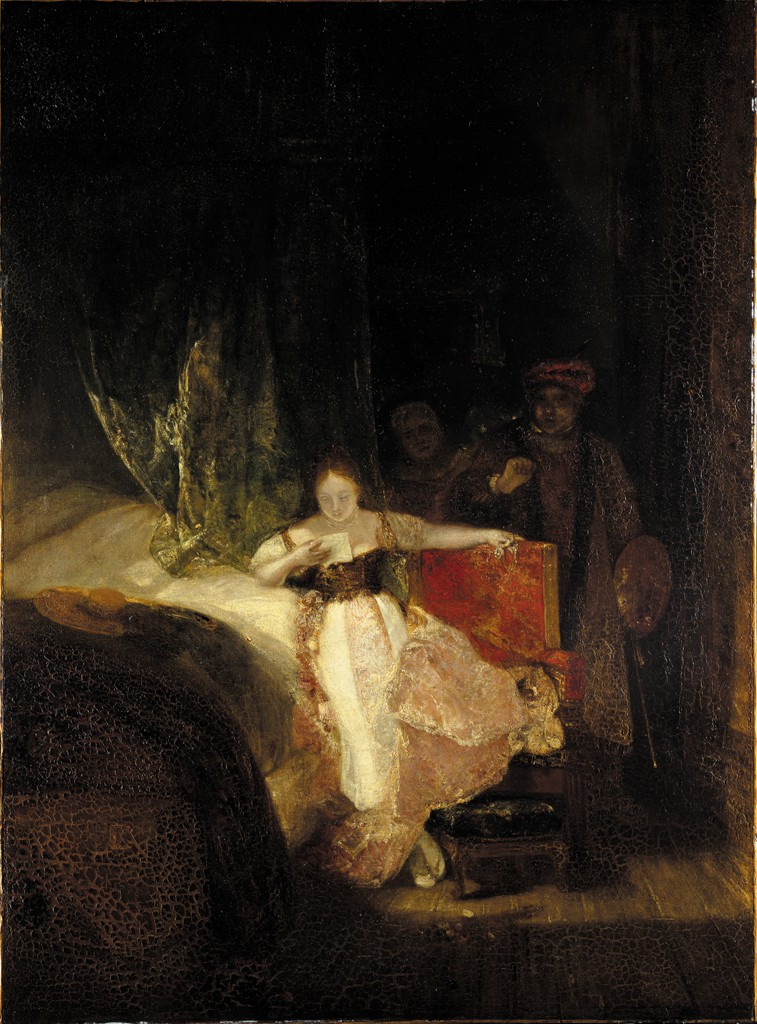
Rembrandt's Daughter by J.M.W. Turner

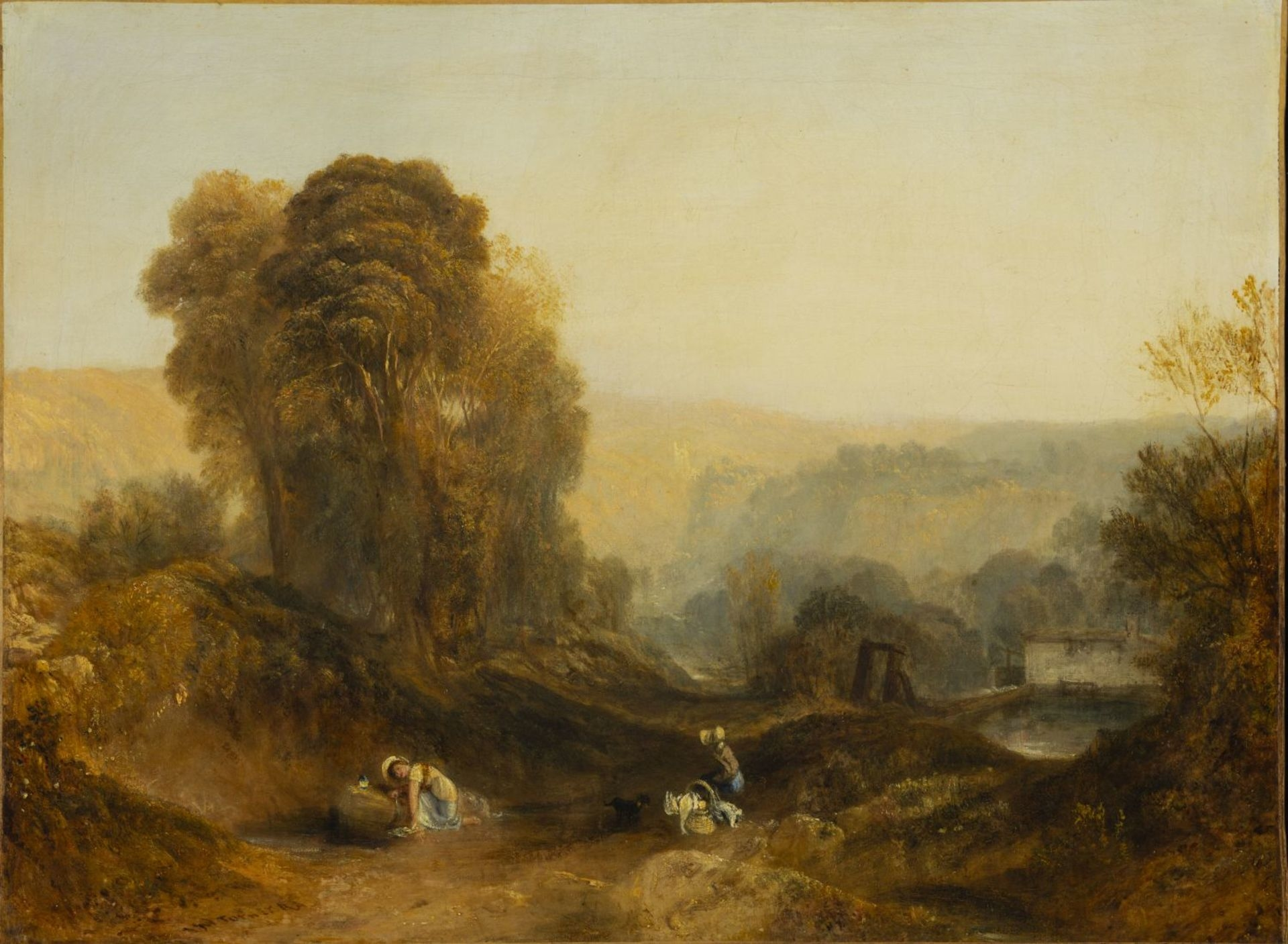
Scene in Derbyshire by J.M.W. Turner

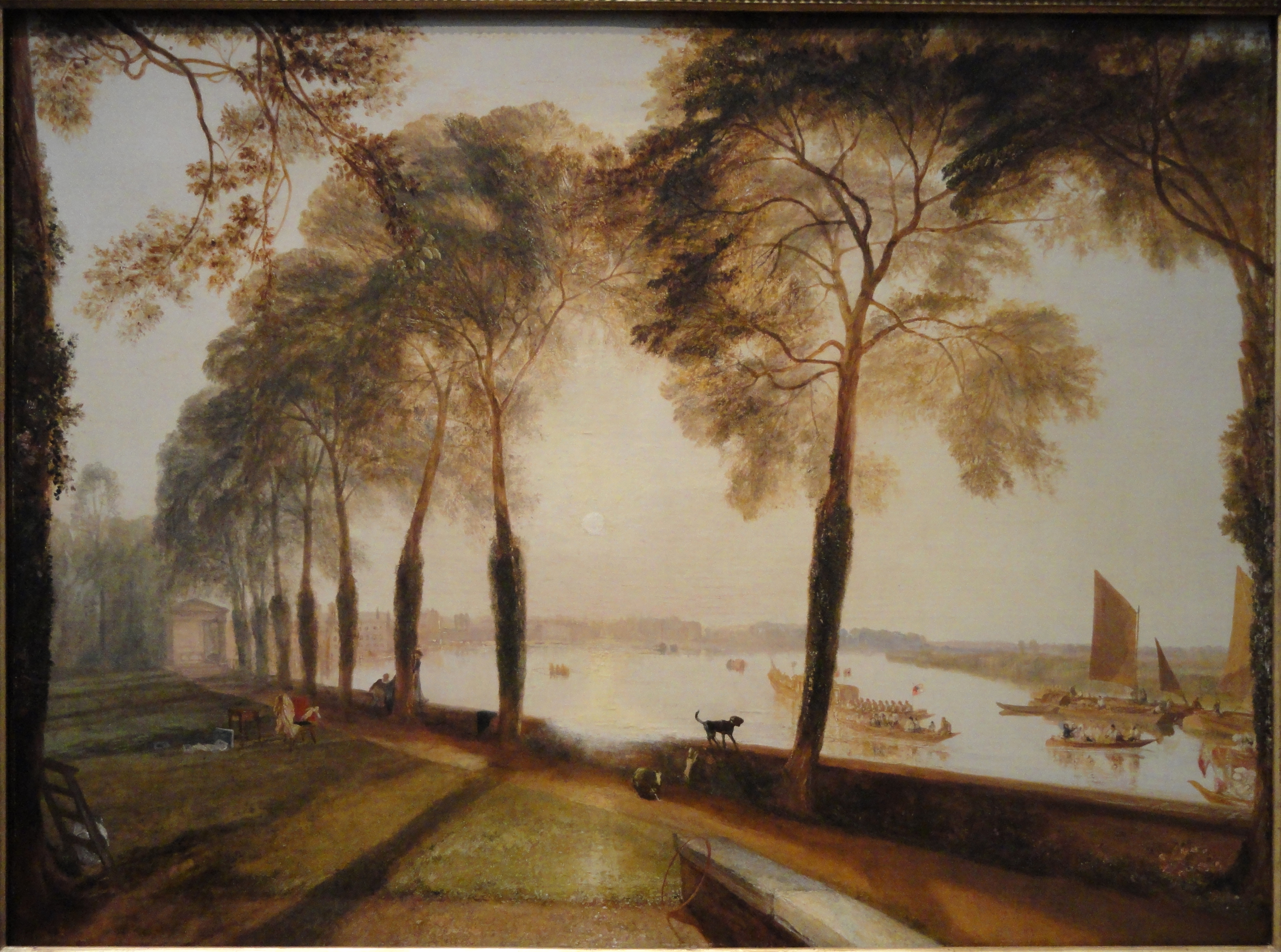
Mortlake Terrace, Evening by J.M.W. Turner

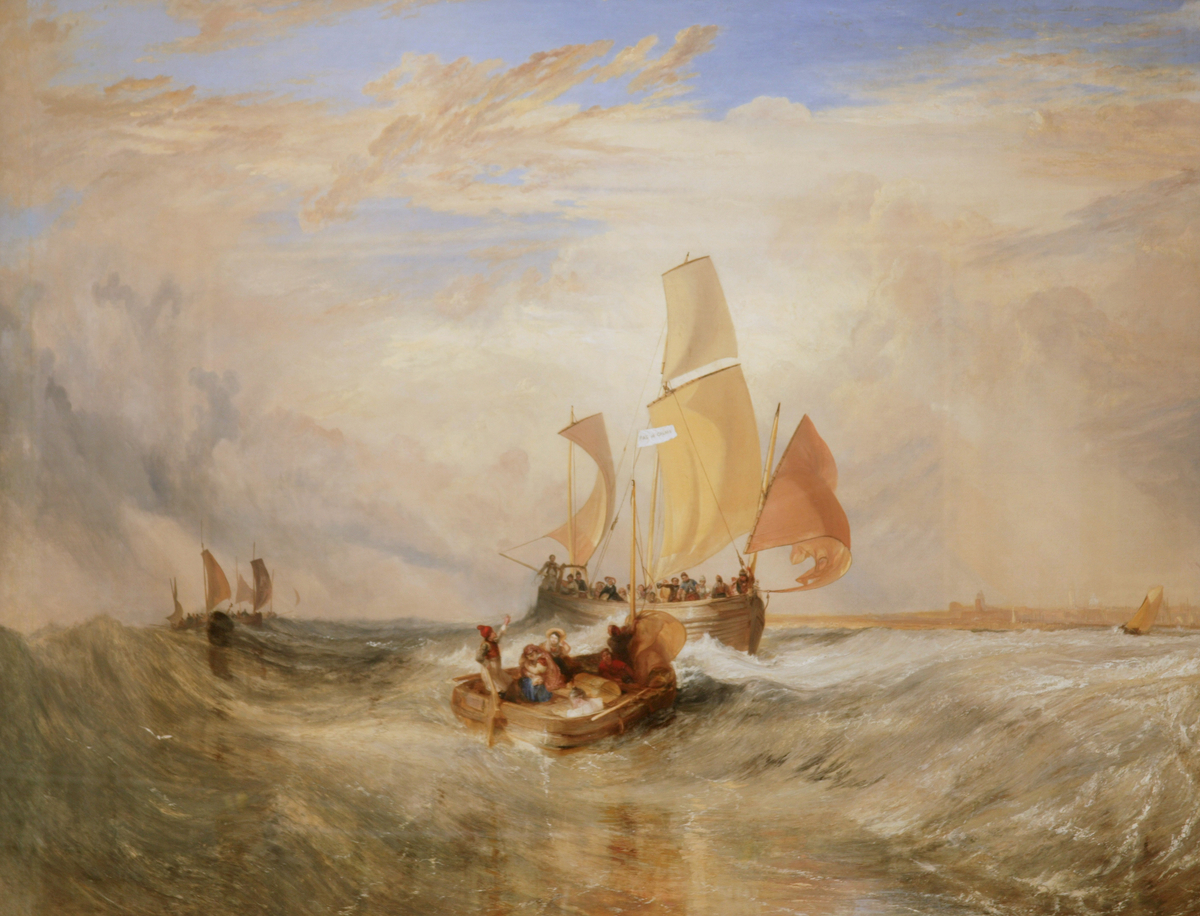
Now for the Painter (Rope) by J.M.W. Turner

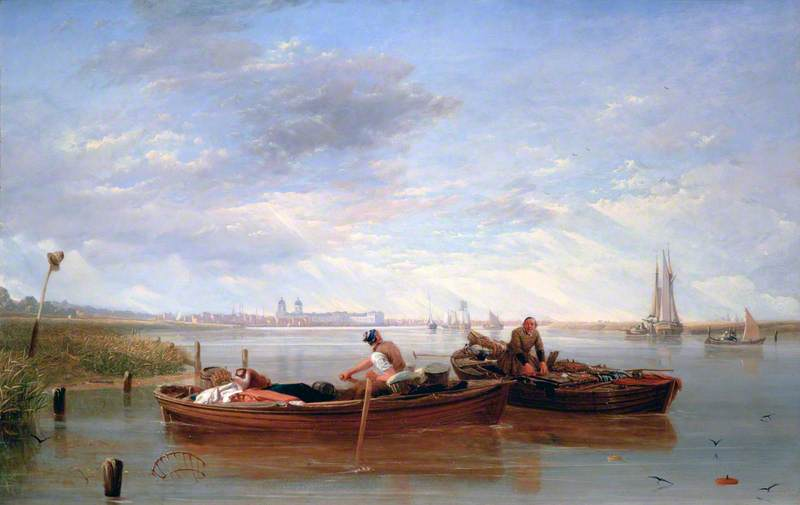
View of the Thames Below Greenwich by Augustus Wall Callcott

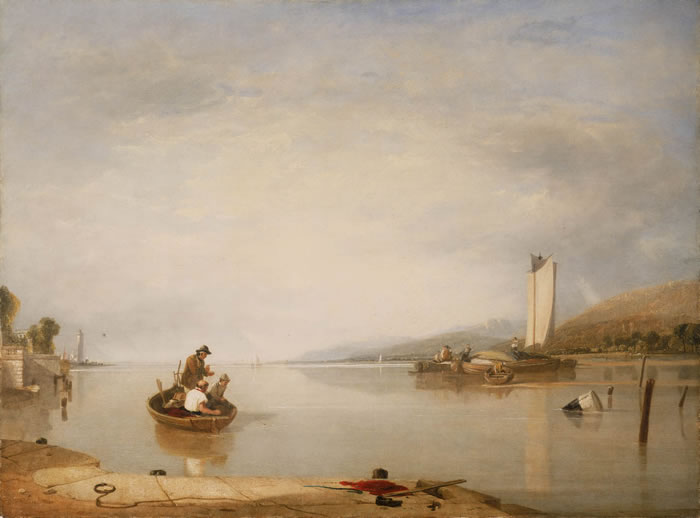
Dead Calm by Augustus Wall Callcott

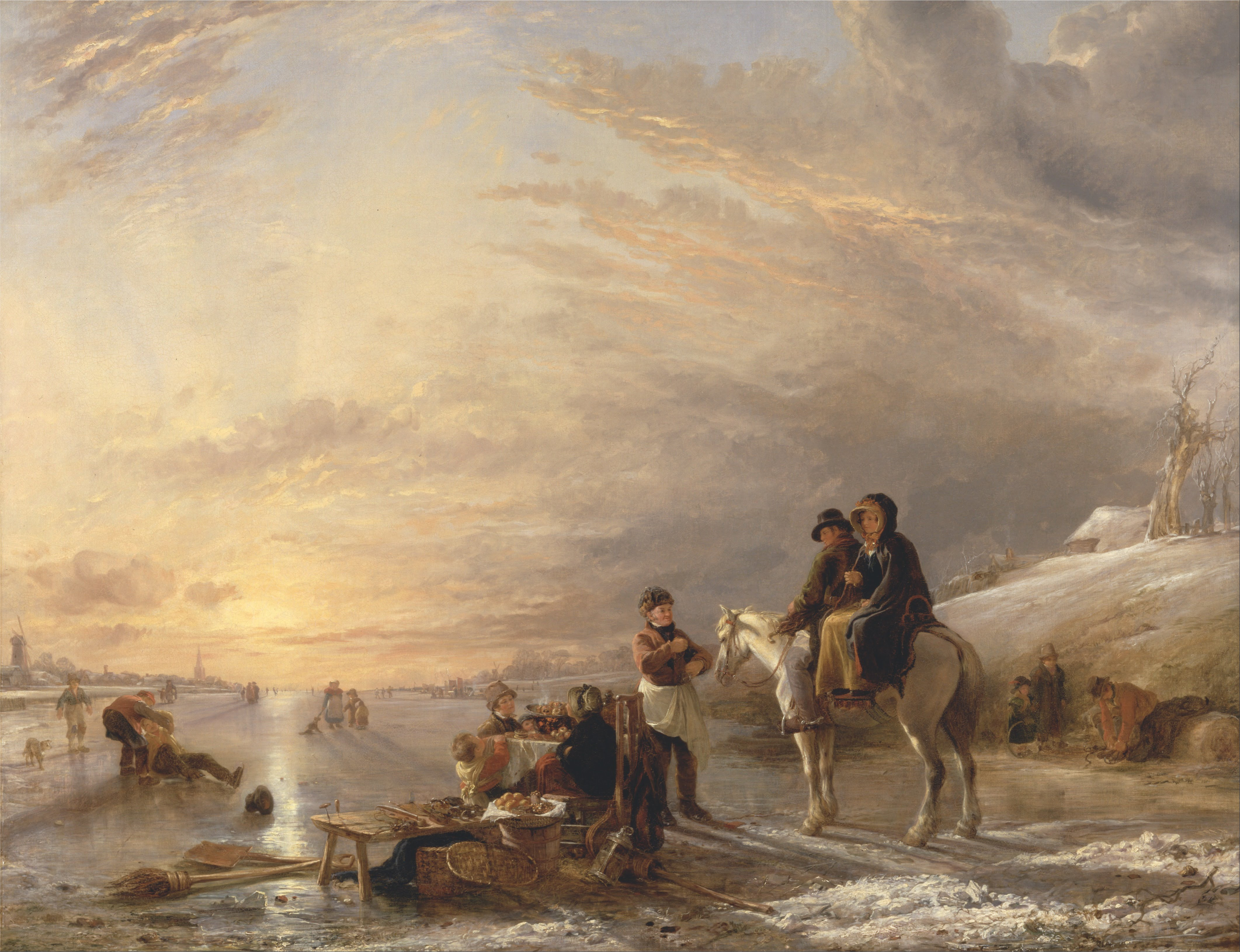
A Frost Scene by William Collins

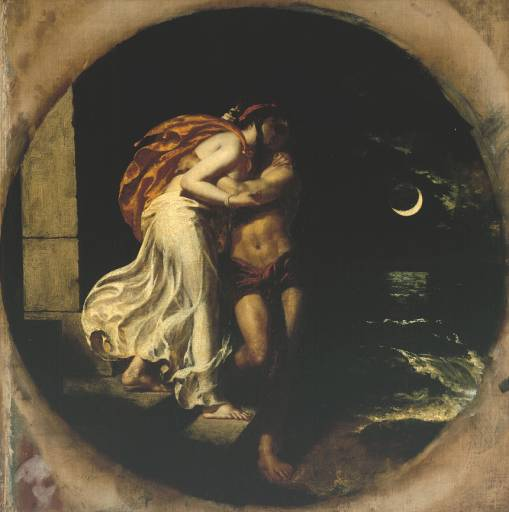
The Parting of Hero and Leander by William Etty

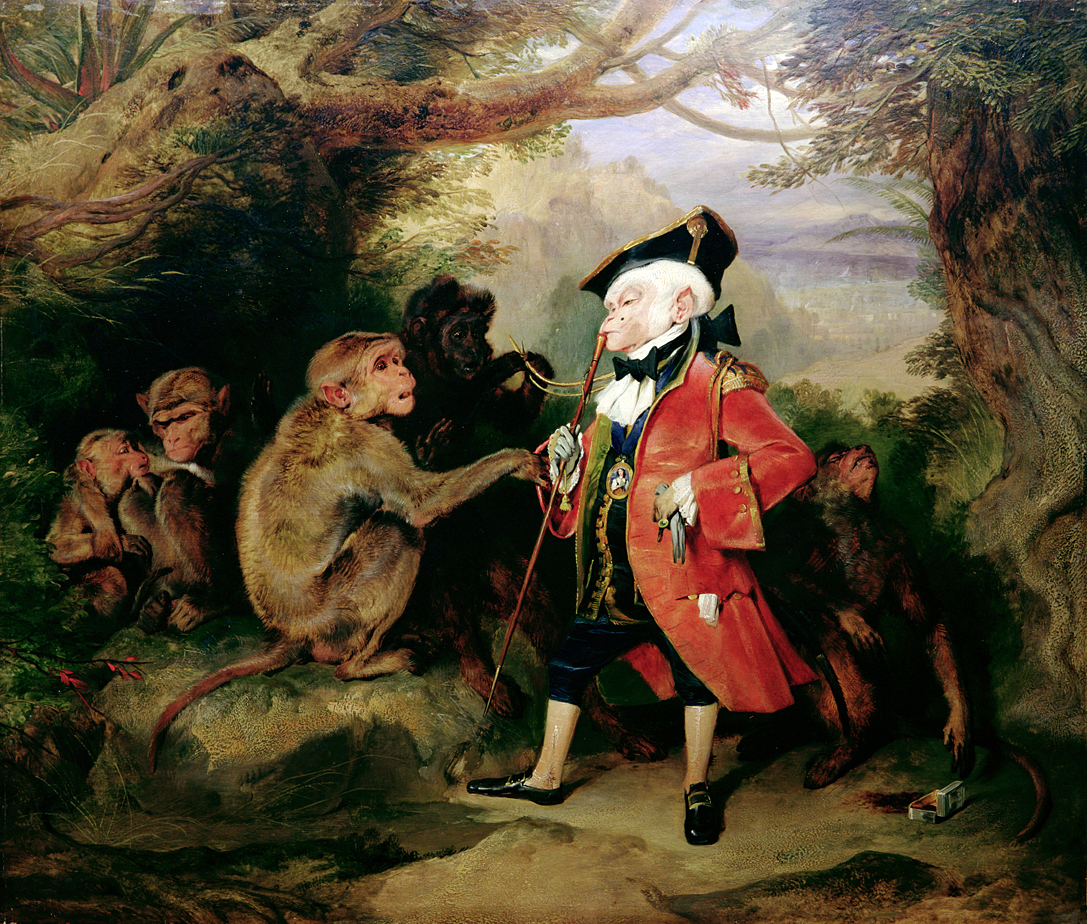
The Monkey Who Had Seen the World by Edwin Landseer

The Deerstalkers' Return by Edwin Landseer

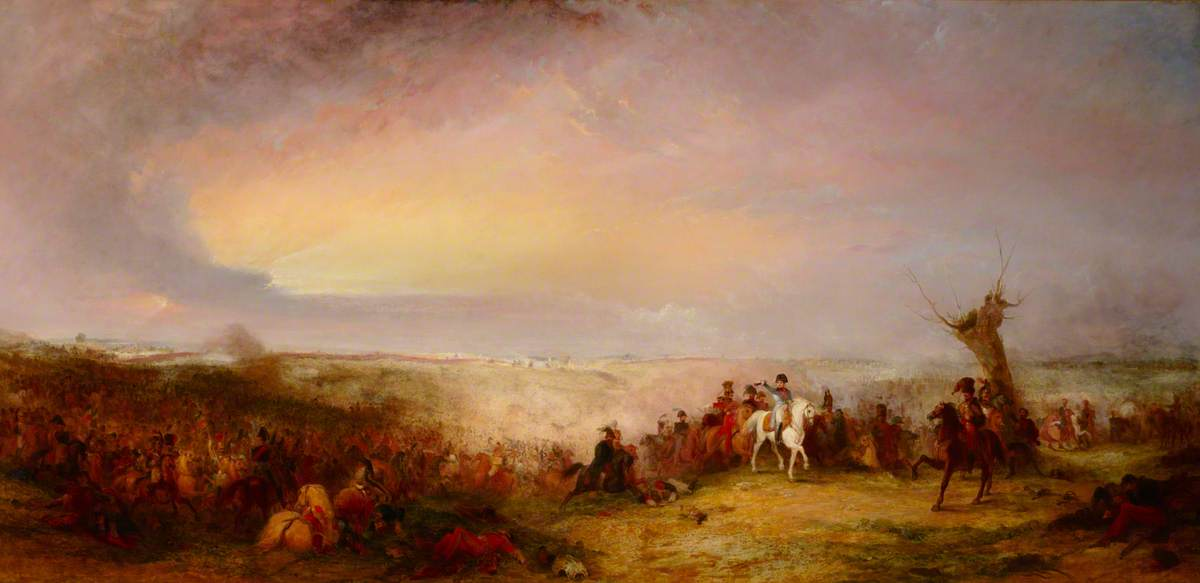
The Battle of Waterloo, The Retreat of the French by George Jones

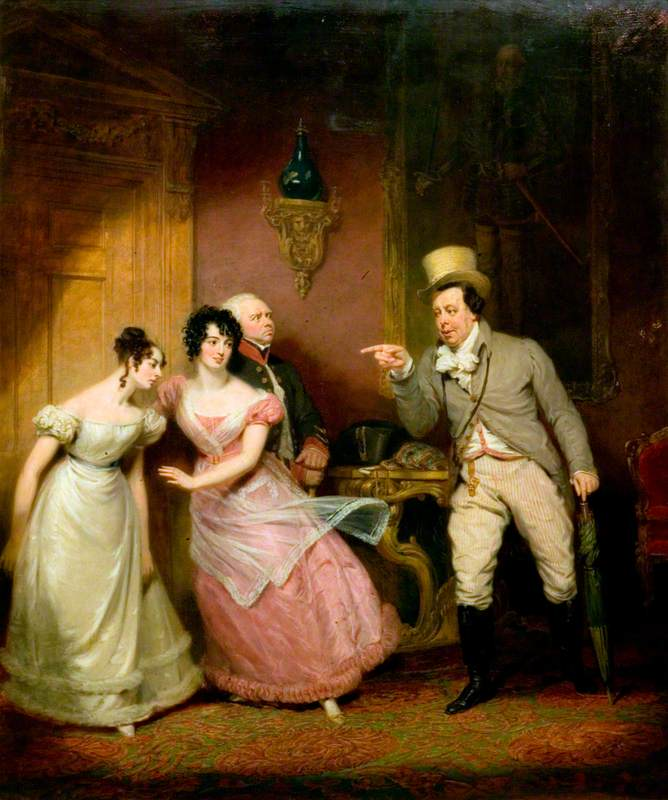
Scene from Paul Pry by George Clint

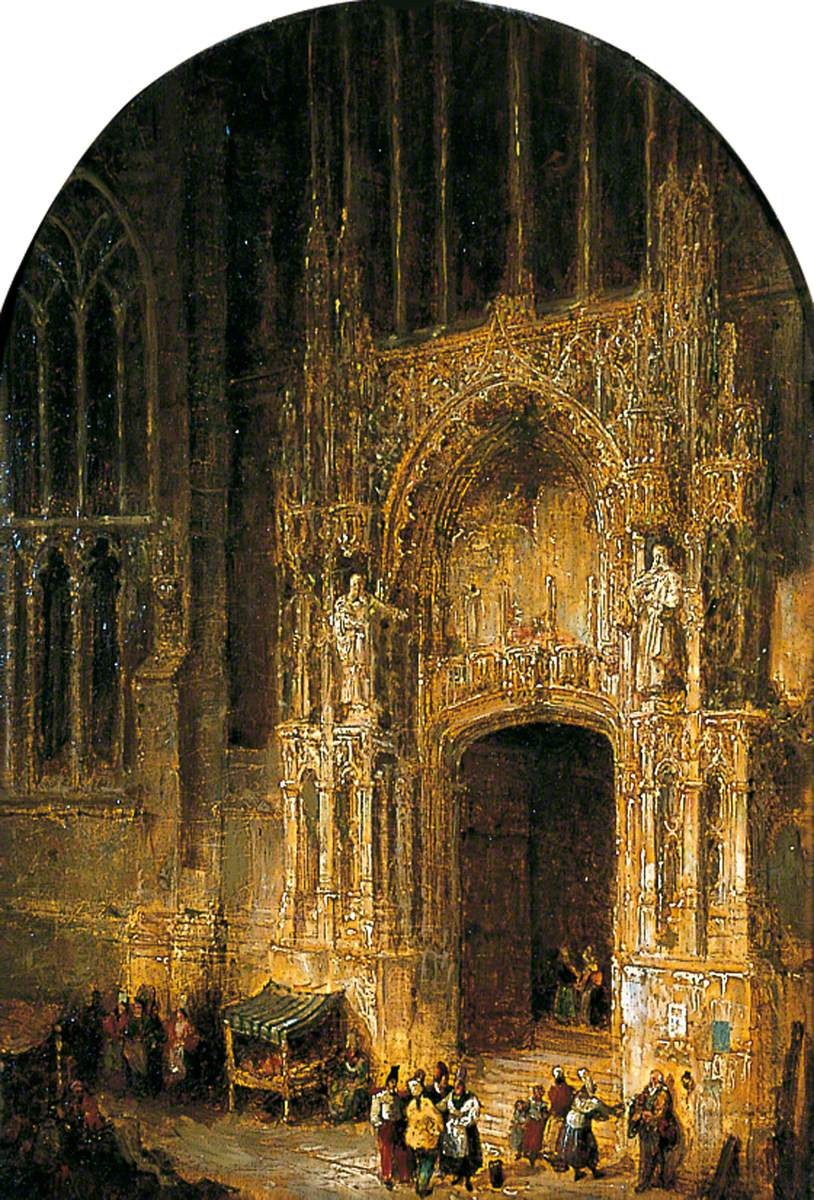
Entrance to St Germain, Amiens by David Roberts

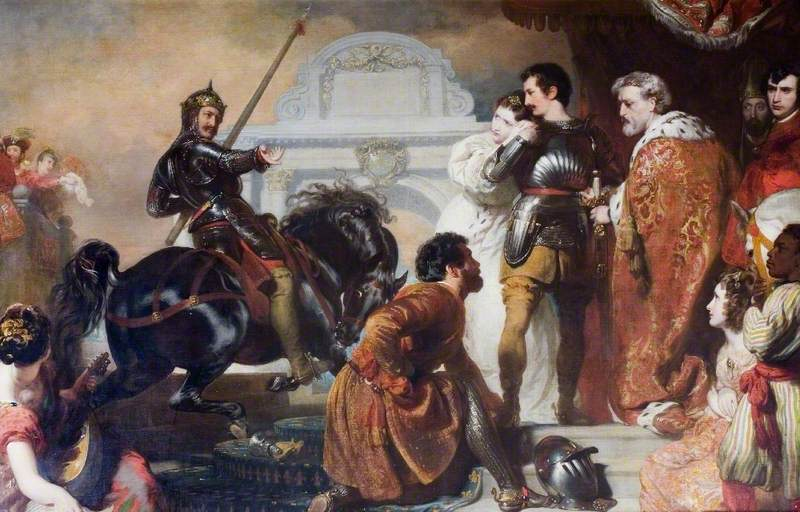
The Challenge of Rodomont to Rogero by Henry Perronet Briggs

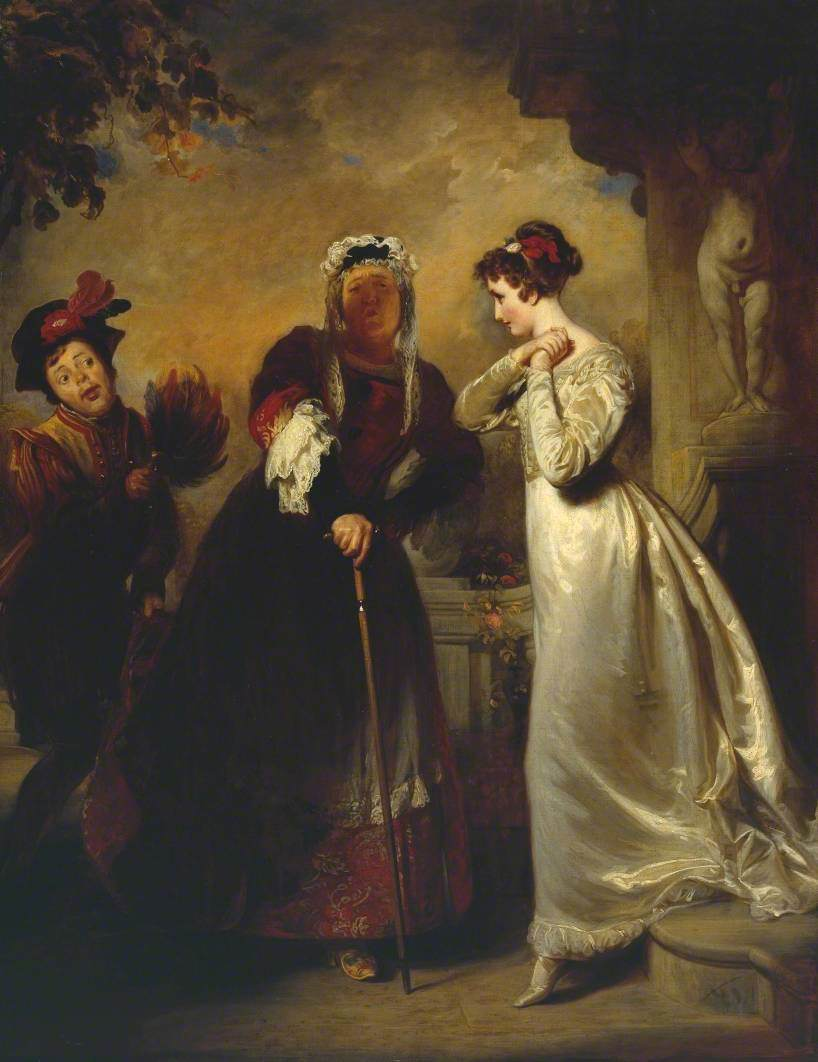
Juliet and Her Nurse by Henry Perronet Briggs

Smolensko by James Ward

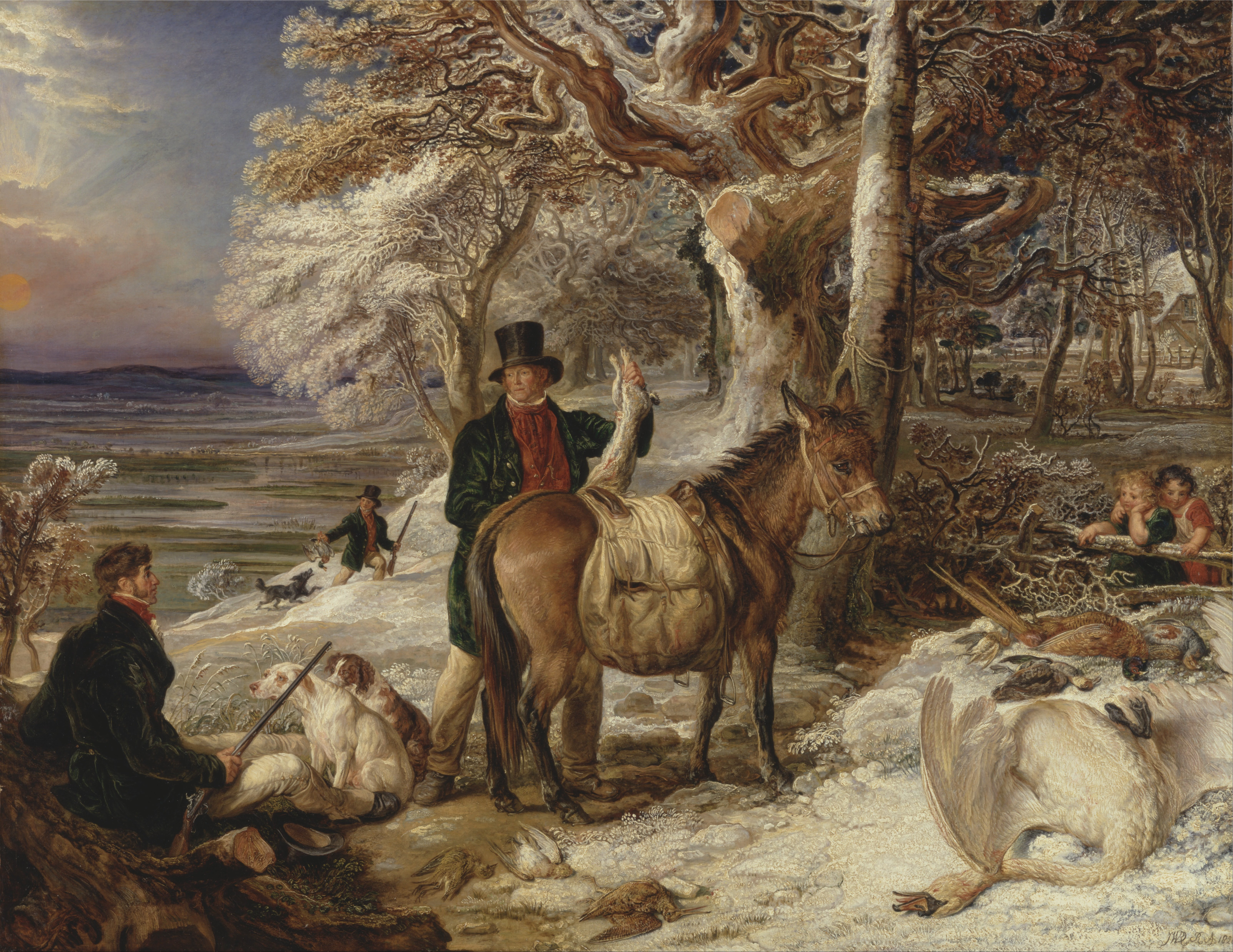
The Day's Sport by James Ward

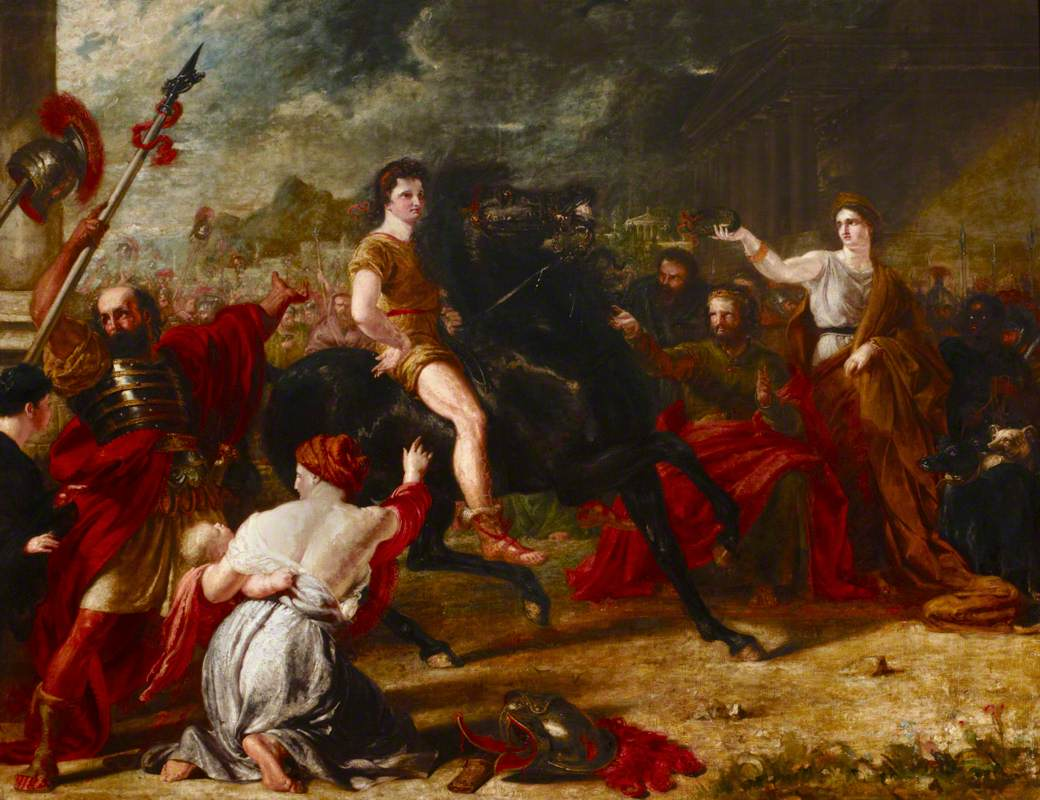
Alexander the Great Taming Bucephalus by Benjamin Robert Haydon

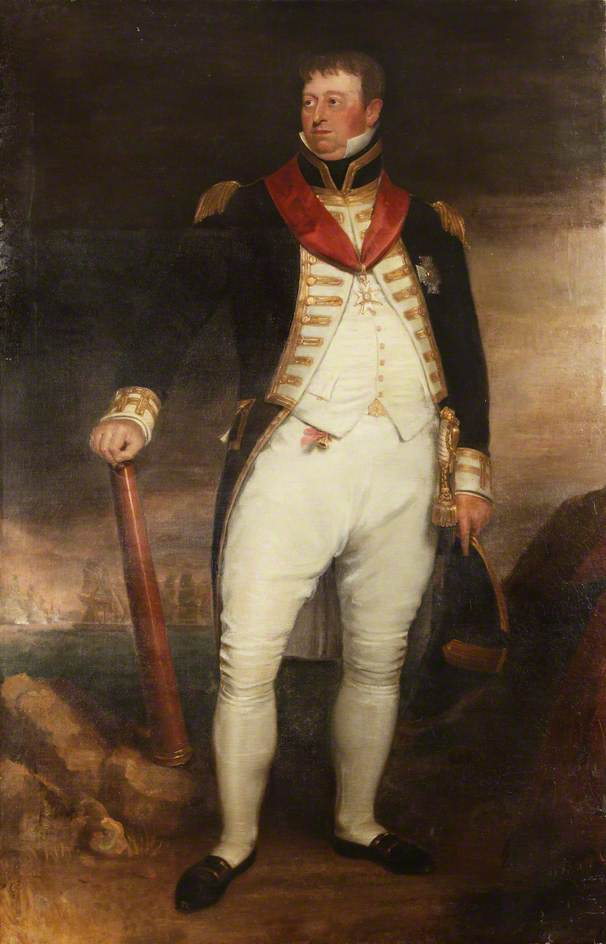
Portrait of Admiral Edward Owen by Richard Evans

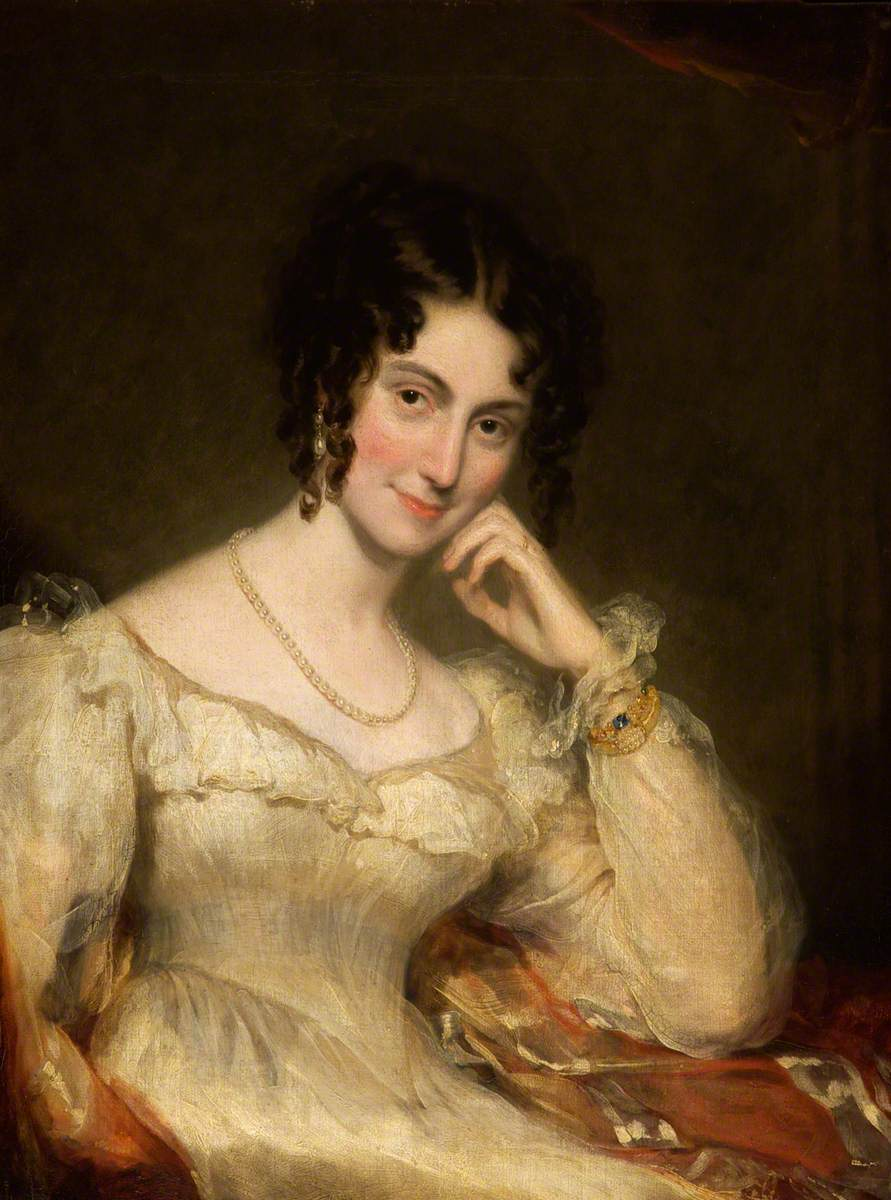
Portrait of Lady de Tabley by John Simpson

== See also ==
- Salon of 1827, an exhibition held at the Louvre in Paris

== Bibliography ==
- Albinson, Cassandra, Funnell, Peter & Peltz, Lucy. Thomas Lawrence: Regency Power and Brilliance. Yale University Press, 2010.
- Bailey, Anthony. John Constable: A Kingdom of his Own. Random House, 2012.
- Charles, Victoria. Constable. Parkstone International, 2015.
- Hamilton, James. Constable: A Portrait. Hachette UK, 2022.
- Hamilton, James. Turner - A Life. Sceptre, 1998.
- Levey, Michael. Sir Thomas Lawrence. Yale University Press, 2005.
- Ormond, Richard. Sir Edwin Landseer. Philadelphia Museum of Art, 1981.
- Wellesley, Charles. Wellington Portrayed. Unicorn Press, 2014.
