= Vale of Health, Hampstead =

Painting by John Constable

- Artist: John Constable
- Year: c.1827
- Type: Oil on canvas, landscape painting
- Dimensions: 53.3 cm × 77.6 cm (21.0 in × 30.6 in)
- Location: Victoria and Albert Museum, London

Vale of Health, Hampstead is a c.1827 landscape painting by the British artist John Constable. It depicts a view of the Vale of Health on Hampstead Heath, today in London but at the time on the outskirts of the city. It is looking north-eastwards across Vale of Health pond towards Highgate It is sometimes dated to the early 1820s. Constable settled in Hampstead and produced many views of the area.

The painting is likely to have been the work that Constable displayed at the Royal Academy Exhibition of 1827 at Somerset House under the title Hampstead Heath. Acquired by the art collector John Sheepshanks it was donated by him in 1857 as part of his large-scale gift to the new Victoria and Albert Museum in South Kensington.

== See also ==
- List of paintings by John Constable

== Bibliography ==
- Charles, Victoria. Constable. Parkstone International, 2015.
- Hamilton, James. Constable: A Portrait. Hachette UK, 2022.
- Parris, Leslie & Fleming-Williams, Ian. Constable. Tate Gallery, 1991.
- Reynolds, Graham .Catalogue of the Constable Collection. Victoria and Albert Museum, 1973.
- Roe, Sonia. Oil Paintings in Public Ownership in the Victoria and Albert Museum. Public Catalogue Foundation, 2008.
