= A Scene at Abbotsford =

Painting by Edwin Landseer

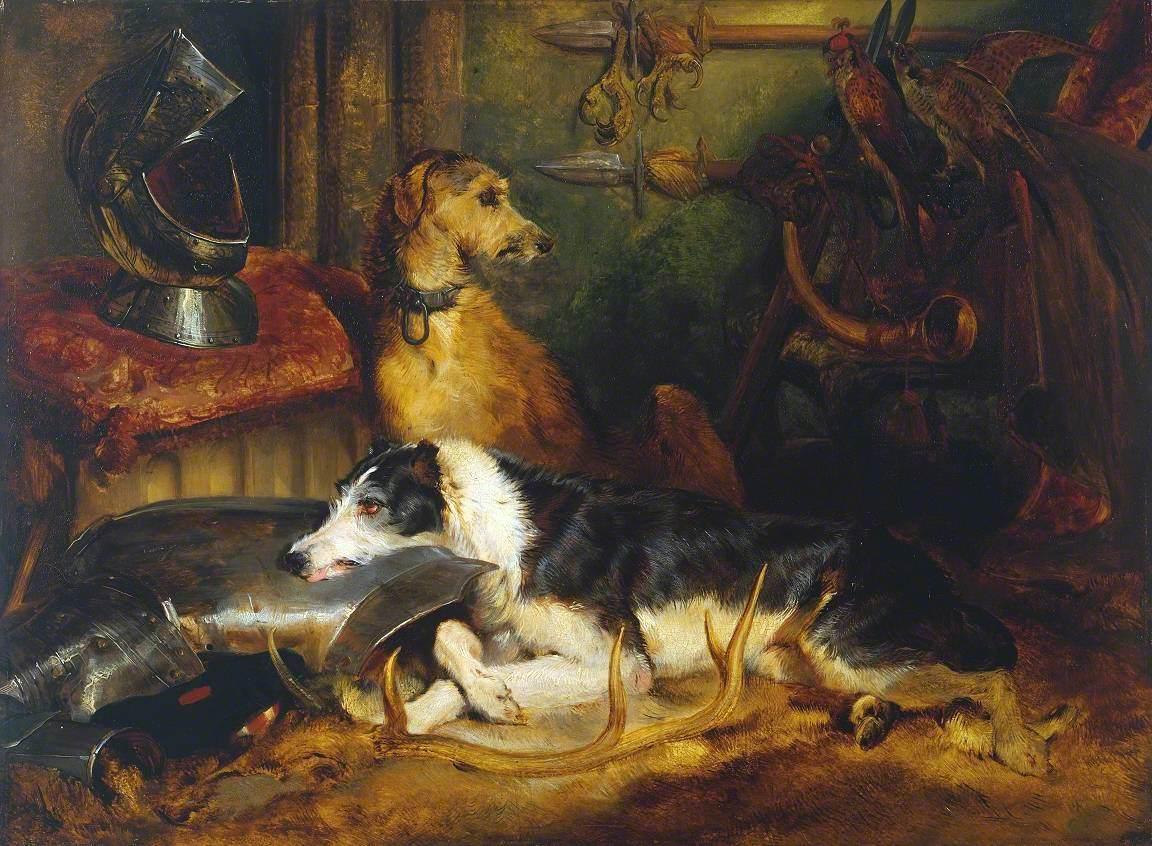
- Artist: Edwin Landseer
- Year: 1827
- Type: Oil on wood, genre painting
- Dimensions: 45.1 cm × 61 cm (17.8 in × 24 in)
- Location: Tate Britain, London

A Scene at Abbotsford is an 1827 oil painting by the British artist Edwin Landseer. The painting shows a scene at the home of the writer Sir Walter Scott at Abbotsford in the Scottish Borders. It was inspired by a visit Landseer had made to Abbotsford in 1824. It features two deerhounds belonging to Scott surrounded by historical artefacts that the antiquarian Scott had filled his house with.

The painting was displayed at the Royal Institution's 1827 exhibition in London and was acquired by the Duke of Bedford. Today it is in the collection of the Tate Britain in Pimlico, having been given in 1894 by Henry Tate.

== Bibliography ==
- Humphreys, Richard. The Tate Britain Companion to British Art. Tate Publishing, 2001.
- Ormond, Richard. Sir Edwin Landseer. Philadelphia Museum of Art, 1981.
