= A Frost Scene =

Painting by William Collins

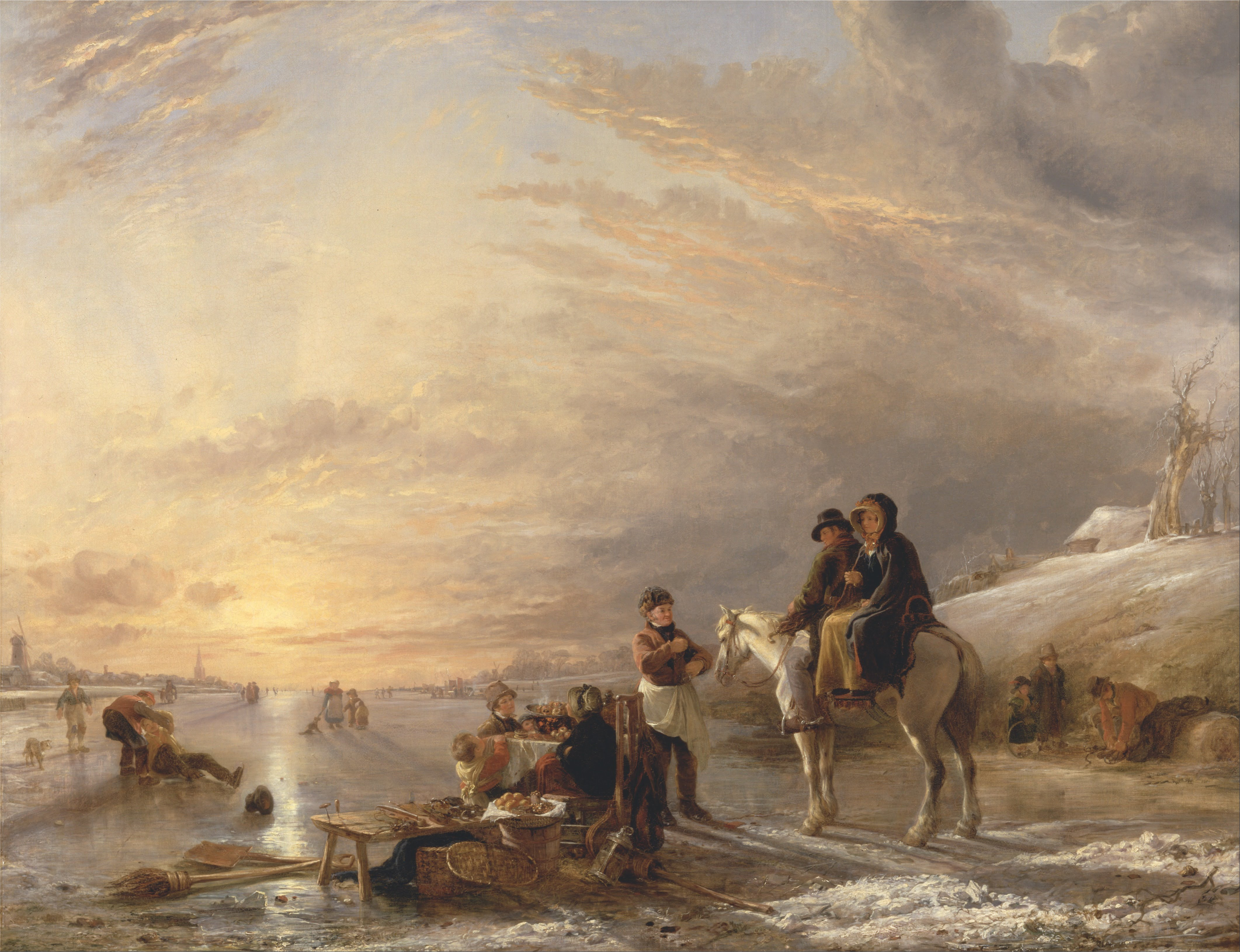
- Artist: William Collins
- Year: 1827
- Type: Oil on canvas, genre painting
- Dimensions: 83.8 cm × 109.2 cm (32.99 in × 42.99 in)
- Location: Yale Center for British Art, New Haven

A Frost Scene is an 1827 oil painting by the British artist William Collins. Combining elements of landscape and genre paintings, it shows a variety of activities on a frozen-over river. Although Collins hoped to produce the work quickly, he ended up spending months bringing it up to completion.

It was commissioned in 1825 by the politician and art collector Robert Peel, them Home Secretary who paid five hundred guineas for the work. It was displayed at the Royal Academy's Summer Exhibition of 1827 at Somerset House in London. Today it is in the Yale Center for British Art in Connecticut as part of the Paul Mellon Collection.

== Bibliography ==
- Gash, Norman. Mr Secretary Peel: The Life of Sir Robert Peel to 1830. Faber & Faber, 2011.
- Noon, Patrick & Bann, Stephen. Constable to Delacroix: British Art and the French Romantics. Tate, 2003.
