= Still Life with Lobsters =

Painting by Eugène Delacroix

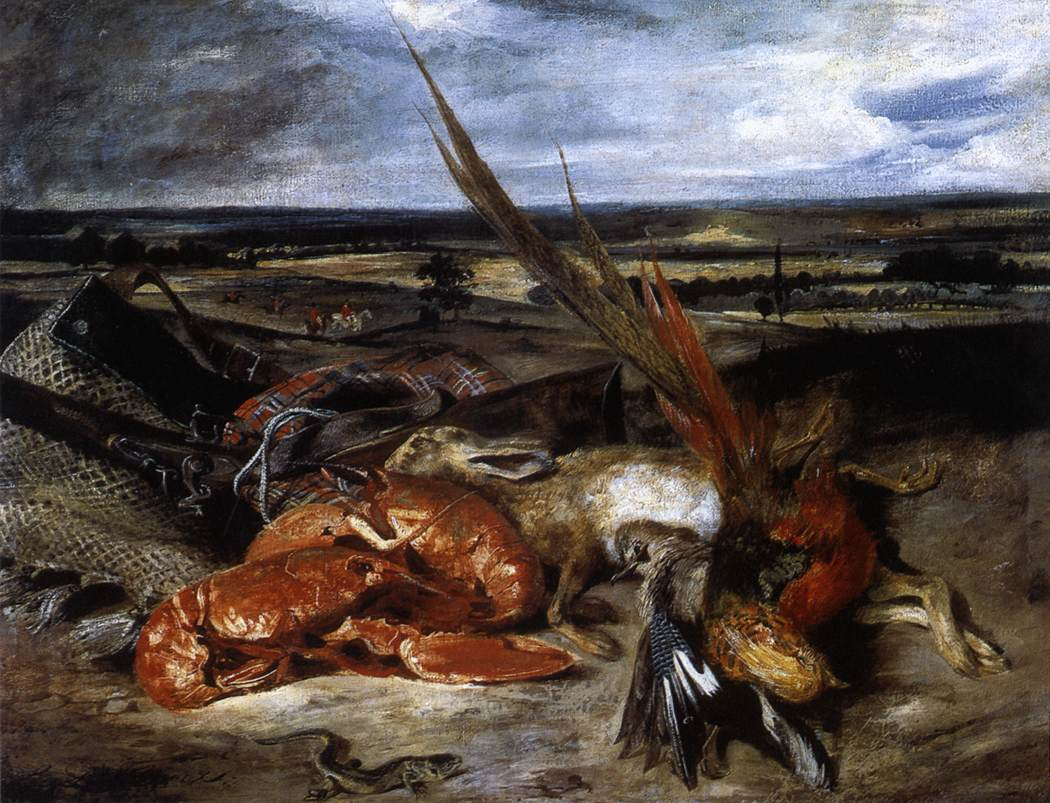
- Artist: Eugène Delacroix
- Year: 1827
- Type: Oil on canvas, still life
- Dimensions: 80.5 cm × 106.5 cm (31.7 in × 41.9 in)
- Location: Louvre; Paris

Still Life with Lobsters is an 1827 oil painting by the French artist Eugène Delacroix. A still life, it features a collection of lobsters and game birds against the backdrop of a county landscape. It is also referred to by the title Game and Shellfish. The Tartan gamebag in the foreground reflects Delacroix's enthusiasm for British culture as do the redcoated fox hunters seen in the distance.

Delacroix was by this time a leading member of the Romantic movement, having made his mark with paintings such as The Barque of Dante and The Massacre at Chios. The painting was commissioned by the Napoleonic era general the Count of Coëtlosquet whose estate Delacroix visited. The work was displayed at the Salon of 1827 held at the Louvre in Paris. In 1906 it was acquired by the French state and is today in the collection of the Louvre.

== Bibliography ==
- Allard, Sébastien & Fabre, Côme. Delacroix. Metropolitan Museum of Art, 2018
- Bendiner, Kenneth. Food in Painting: From the Renaissance to the Present. University of Chicago Press, 2004.
- Ormond, Richard. Sir Edwin Landseer. Philadelphia Museum of Art, 1981.
