= Scene in Derbyshire =

Painting by J. M. W. Turner

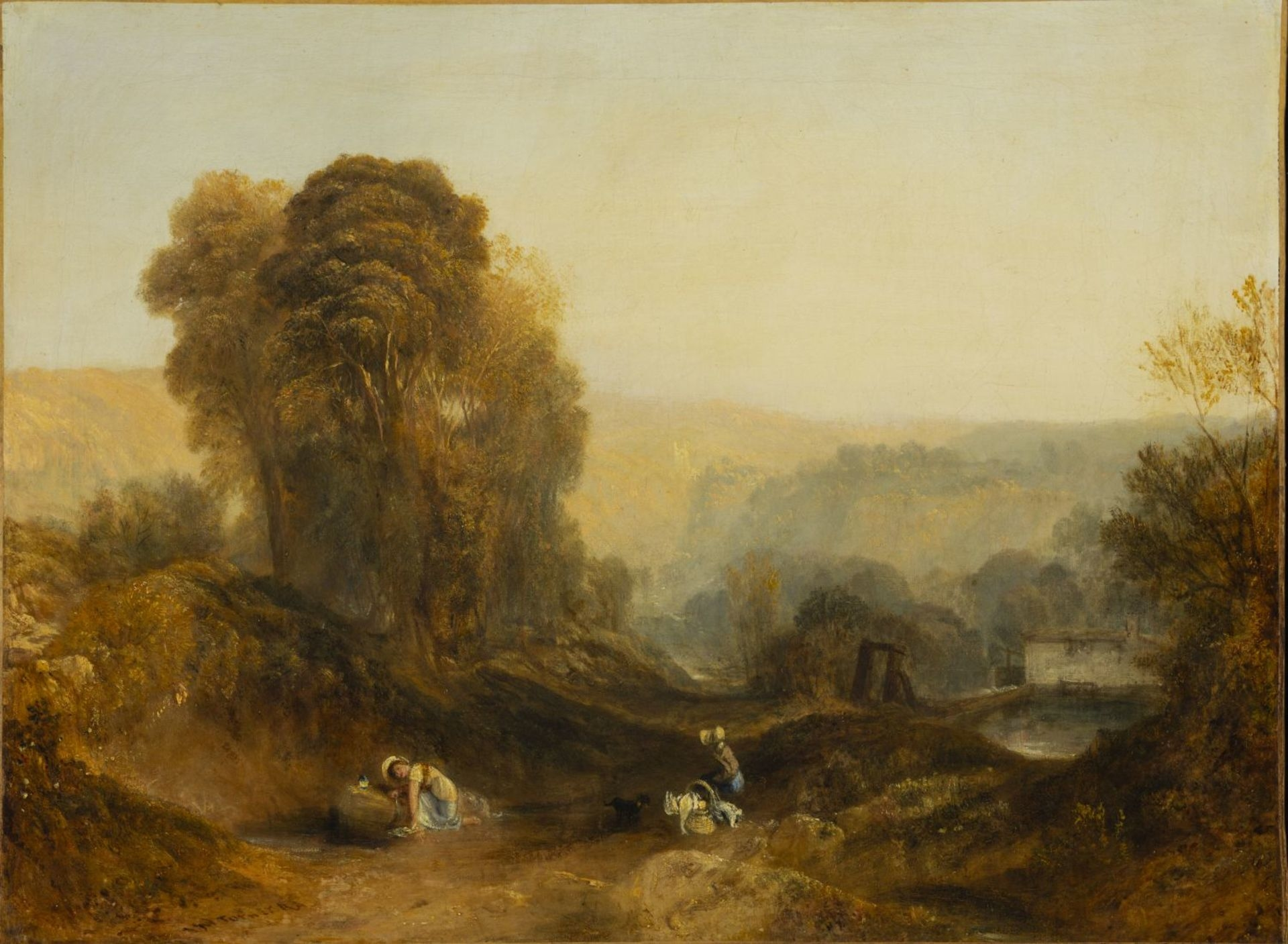
- Artist: J. M. W. Turner
- Year: 1827
- Type: Oil on canvas, landscape painting
- Dimensions: 45 cm × 61 cm (18 in × 24 in)
- Location: Musée national des beaux-arts du Québec, Quebec City

Scene in Derbyshire (French: Scène dans le Derbyshire) is an 1827 painting by the British artist J.M.W. Turner. It depicts a view near the Heights of Abraham at Matlock Bath in Derbyshire. The painting was displayed at the Royal Academy Exhibition of 1827 at Somerset House in London. It is today in the collection of the Musée national des beaux-arts du Québec in Quebec City.

== See also ==
- List of paintings by J. M. W. Turner

== Bibliography ==
- Casaliggi, Carmen. John Ruskin, J.M.W. Turner and the Art of Water. Cambridge Scholars Publishing, 2022.
- Kelly, Franklin. J.M.W. Turner. Tate Publishing, 2007.
