= Portrait of Julia, Lady Peel =

1827 painting by Thomas Lawrence

Julia, Lady Peel
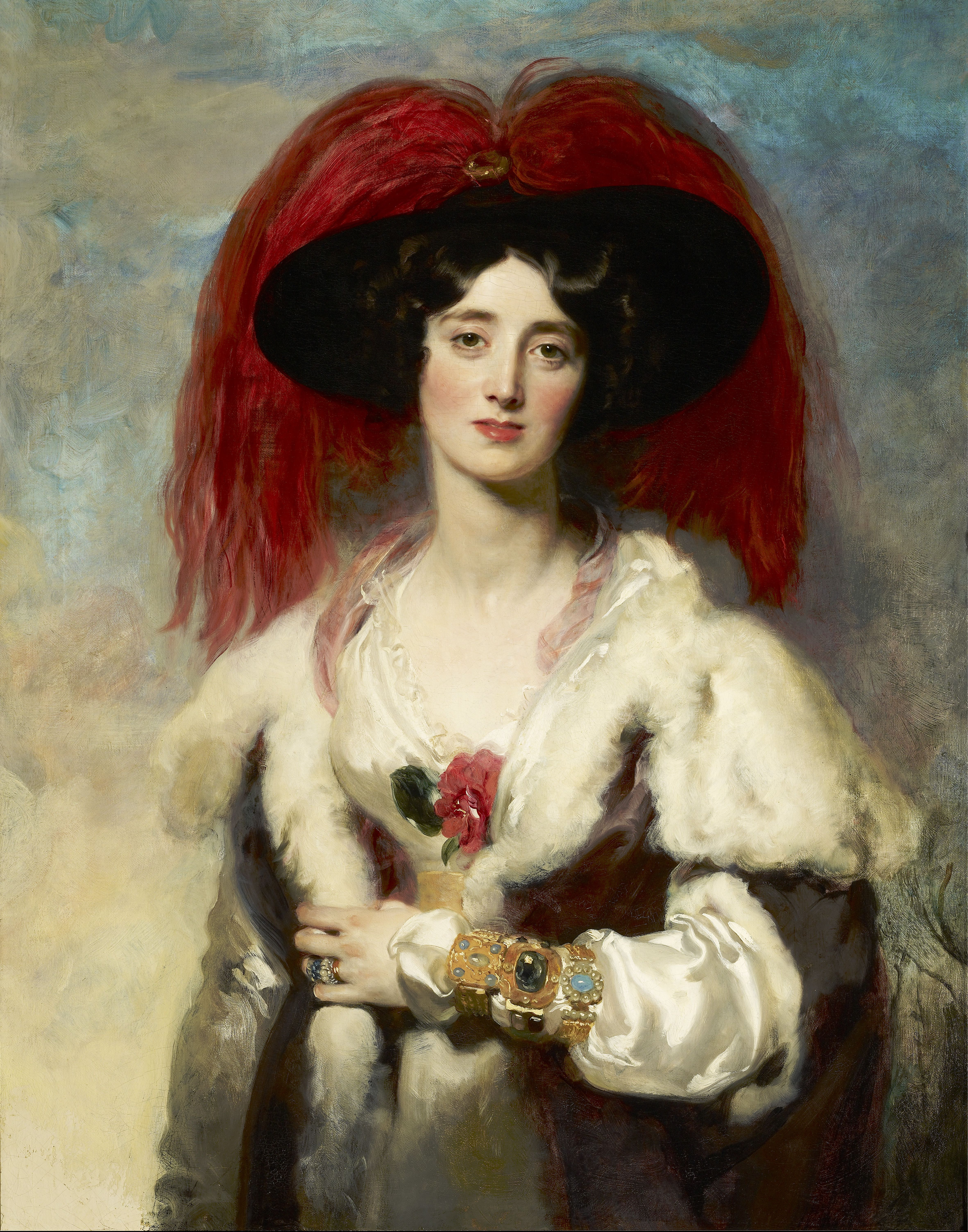
- Artist: Thomas Lawrence
- Year: 1827
- Type: Oil on canvas, portrait
- Dimensions: 90.8 cm × 70.8 cm (35.7 in × 27.9 in)
- Location: Frick Collection, New York City

The Portrait of Julia, Lady Peel is an 1827 portrait painting by the English artist Sir Thomas Lawrence depicting Julia Peel (1795-1859), the wife of the politician Sir Robert Peel. She married Peel in 1820. When she sat for Lawrence at the age of 32-33, her husband was Home Secretary and later twice served as Prime Minister of the United Kingdom (1834–1835, 1841–1846). Lawrence was President of the Royal Academy and one of the most fashionable painters of the Regency era.

It was exhibited at the Royal Academy's Summer Exhibition of 1827. The painting was sold by her grandson in 1896. It is now in the Frick Collection in New York City.

== See also ==
- Portrait of Sir Robert Peel, an 1838 portrait of her husband by John Linnell

== Bibliography ==
- Gash, Norman. Mr Secretary Peel: The Life of Sir Robert Peel to 1830. Faber & Faber, 2011.
- Hurd, Douglas. Robert Peel: A Biography. Hachette UK, 2017.
- Stott, Annette Schmidt, Benjamin & Goodfriend, Joyce. Going Dutch: The Dutch Presence in America 1609-2009. Brill, 2009.
