= 1827 in the United Kingdom =

Events from the year 1827 in the United Kingdom.

== Incumbents ==
- Monarch – George IV
- Prime Minister – Robert Jenkinson, 2nd Earl of Liverpool (Tory) (until 9 April); George Canning (Coalition) (starting 10 April, until 8 August); F. J. Robinson, 1st Viscount Goderich (Coalition) (starting 31 August)
- Foreign Secretary – George Canning (until 30 April) John Ward, 1st Earl of Dudley (starting 30 April)
- Home Secretary – Robert Peel (until 10 April) William Sturges Bourne (30 April to 16 July) Lord Lansdowne (from 16 July)
- Secretary of War – Lord Bathurst (until 30 April) Frederick Robinson (30 April to 3 September) William Huskisson (from 3 September)

== Events ==
Banquet in the Thames Tunnel by George Jones

- 17 January – The Duke of Wellington becomes Commander-in-Chief of the Forces.
- 1 March – St David's College, Lampeter, Wales, opens its doors to its first students.
- 7 March – Shrigley abduction: Ellen Turner, a wealthy 15-year-old heiress from Cheshire, is abducted by Edward Gibbon Wakefield. On 14 May Wakefield, his brother and a servant are sentenced to three years' imprisonment for the crime. Wakefield later becomes a colonial politician.
- 7 April – John Walker begins selling his invention, the "Lucifer" friction match.
- 10 April – George Canning succeeds Lord Liverpool as British prime minister following the latter's resignation due to ill health after almost fifteen years in office.
- 18 May – Red Barn Murder in Suffolk: Maria Marten is shot by her lover.
- 21 May – Launch of the London Standard newspaper.
- 21 June – The first of Peel's Acts begin to consolidate the criminal law. Hue and cry and benefit of clergy are abolished and the setting of mantraps to catch poachers is made illegal.
- 6 July – Treaty of London between France, Britain and Russia to demand that the Turks agree to an armistice in Greece.
- 8 August – Prime Minister George Canning dies in office only 119 days after being appointed, making him the second shortest-serving prime minister in British history.
- 31 August – Frederick John Robinson, 1st Viscount Goderich is appointed prime minister following the death of Canning, continuing the Canningite Government as the Goderich Ministry; he will serve for only 144 days.
- 20 October – Battle of Navarino (Greek War of Independence): British, French and Russian naval forces destroy the Turko-Egyptian fleet in Greece. This is the last naval action to be fought under sail alone.
- 10 November – A banquet is held in the Thames Tunnel under construction in London, attended by the Duke of Wellington and Isambard Kingdom Brunel
- November – The term "socialist" is coined by Robert Owen in his London periodical, The Co-operative Magazine and Monthly Herald.

=== Ongoing ===
- Anglo-Ashanti war (1823–1831)

=== Undated ===
- Physician Richard Bright first describes the renal condition which will become known as Bright's disease.
- Scottish botanist Robert Brown observes the phenomenon of Brownian motion.
- Yorkshire Philosophical Society begins excavation of St Mary's Abbey, York, prior to construction of the Yorkshire Museum on part of the site.

== Publications ==
- John James Audubon's The Birds of America (printing of plates begins in the UK).
- Thomas De Quincey's essay On Murder Considered as one of the Fine Arts (in Blackwood's Magazine, February).
- Sir Walter Scott's stories Chronicles of the Canongate (published in Edinburgh 30 October anonymously, though Scott has publicly acknowledged his authorship of the Waverley Novels on 23 February).

== Births ==
- 7 January – Sandford Fleming, Scottish-born civil engineer, "father of time zones" (died 1915 in Canada)
- 14 January – Enderby Jackson, pioneer of the British brass band (died 1903)
- 24 February – Lydia Becker, suffragette (died 1890)
- 4 March – Henrietta Keddie ('Sarah Tytler'), Scottish-born novelist (died 1914)
- 7 March – John Hall Gladstone, chemist and physicist (died 1902)
- 14 March – George Frederick Bodley, architect (died 1907)
- 16 March – Edward Binyon, landscape painter (died 1876)
- 25 March – Edward Bradley ('Cuthbert Bede'), novelist (died 1889)
- 2 April – William Holman Hunt, Pre-Raphaelite painter (died 1910)
- 5 April – Joseph Lister, 1st Baron Lister, pioneer of antiseptic surgery (died 1912)
- 8 April – Barbara Bodichon, née Leigh Smith, women's rights activist, pioneer of women's education and painter (died 1891)
- 14 April – Augustus Pitt Rivers, né Lane-Fox, archaeologist (died 1900)
- 4 May – John Hanning Speke, explorer (died 1864)
- 16 July – William McEwan, Scottish-born brewer and politician (died 1913)
- 17 July – Sir Frederick Abel, chemist (died 1902)
- 16 August – Frances Buss, pioneer of women's education (died 1894)
- 19 September – J. P. Seddon, architect (died 1906)
- 24 October – George Robinson, 1st Marquess of Ripon, Liberal Party politician (died 1909)
- Henry Gray, anatomist (died 1861)
- Margaret Eleanor Parker, social reformer (died 1896)

== Deaths ==
- 2 January – John Mason Good, writer (born 1764)
- 5 January – Prince Frederick, Duke of York and Albany, heir-presumptive to the throne (born 1763)
- 28 February – Thomas Holloway, portrait painter and engraver (born 1748)
- 21 April – Thomas Rowlandson, artist and caricaturist (born 1757)
- 26 June – Samuel Crompton, inventor (born 1753)
- 21 July – Archibald Constable, Scottish publisher (born 1774)
- 8 August – George Canning, statesman, Prime Minister from April (born 1770)
- 12 August – William Blake, poet, painter and printmaker (born 1757)
