= The Battle of Vittoria (painting) =

1822 painting by George Jones

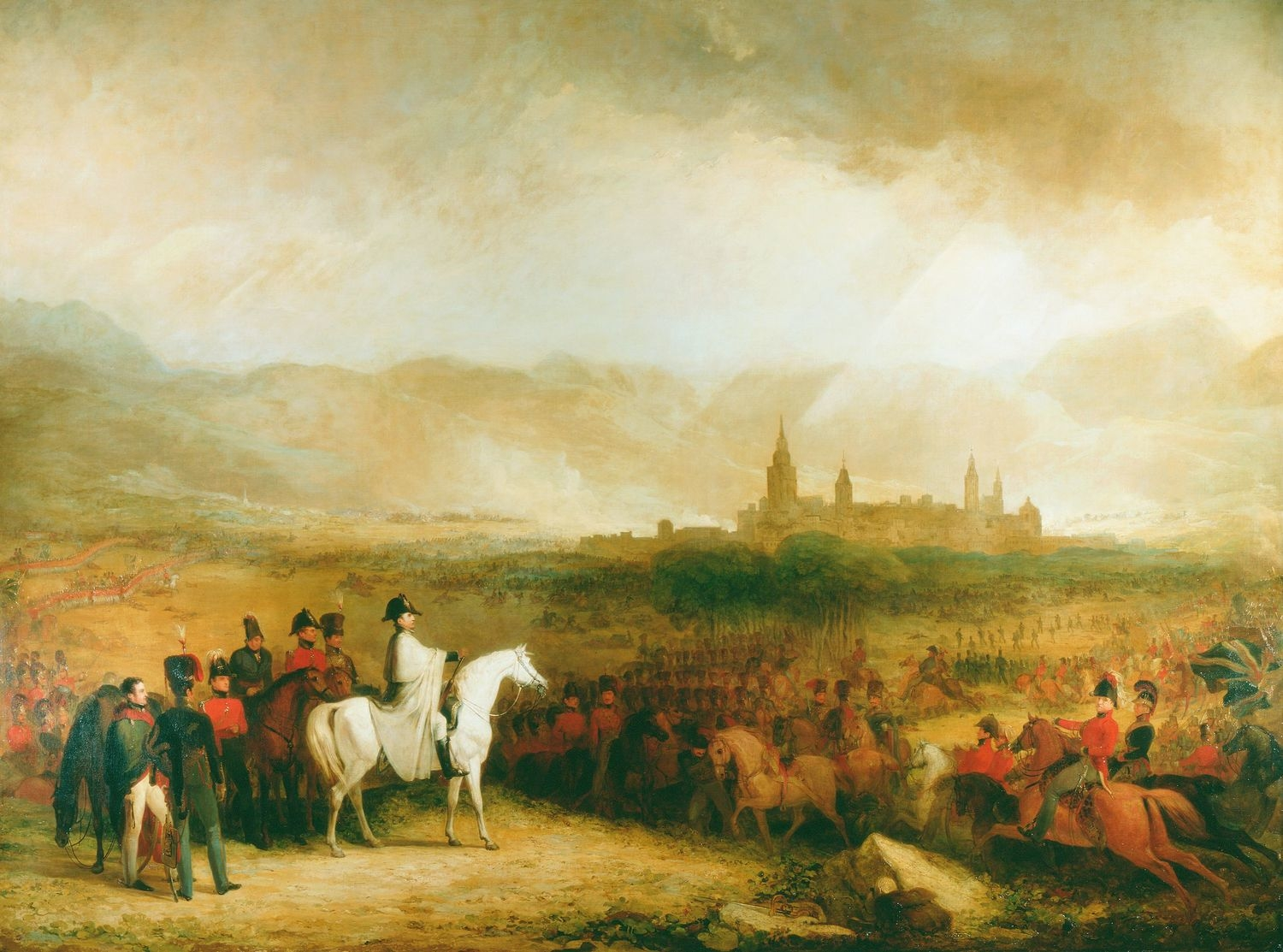
- Artist: George Jones
- Year: 1822
- Medium: Oil on canvas
- Dimensions: 238.5 cm × 318.9 cm (93.9 in × 125.6 in)
- Location: St James's Palace, London

The Battle of Vittoria is a painting of 1822 by the British artist George Jones.

== History and description ==
It depicts the Battle of Vittoria fought in Spain on 21 June 1813 during the Napoleonic Wars. The battle resulted in a decisive victory for Allied forces led by the Duke of Wellington, effectively ending the rule of Napoleon's brother Joseph Bonaparte over Spain. Wellington is shown mounted on a white charger and is directing the final assault towards Vittoria. It is set in the early evening with French troops in disarray while British units including the Hussars, Guards and Rifles are shown in command of the field.

George Jones was himself a veteran of the Peninsular War and went on to become an established artist and member of the Royal Academy. The work was commissioned by George IV. Jones also produced a companion piece depicting the Battle of Waterloo. These were hung together at St James's Palace in London along with De Loutherbourg's Glorious First of June and The Battle of Trafalgar by Jones's friend J. M. W. Turner. However the king disliked the latter and soon had it shifted to Greenwich Hospital. Both works by Jones remain in the Royal Collection.

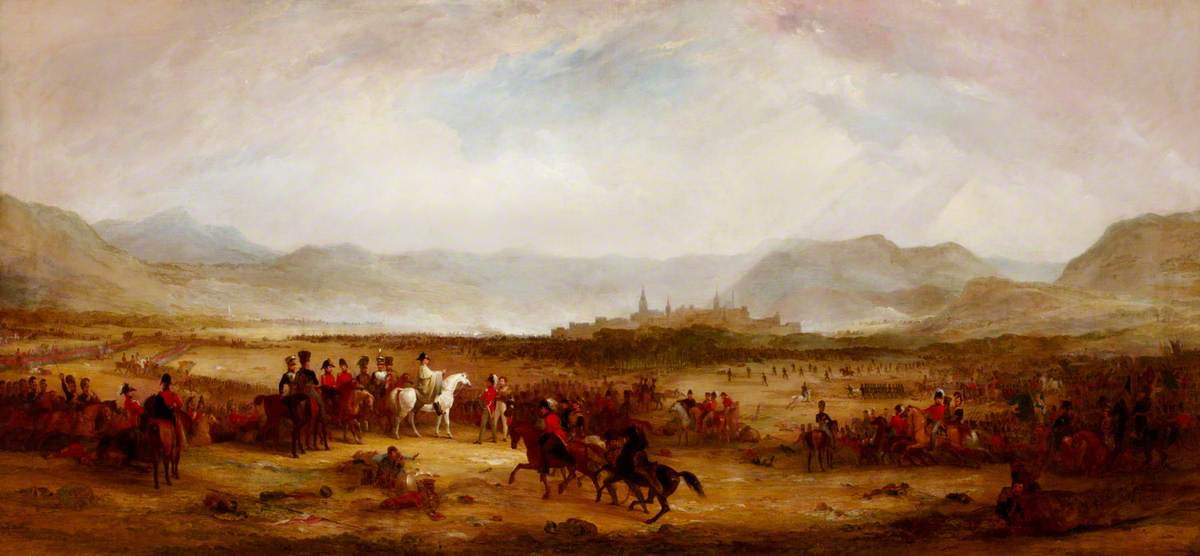
Jones's 1827 version of The Battle of Vittoria now at Petworth House.

Jones was later commissioned to produce another version of the Battle of Vittoria by Earl of Egremont, whose son Henry Wyndham had served under Wellington during the campaign. It is now at Petworth House in Sussex.

== Bibliography ==
- Lloyd, Christopher. The Royal Collection: A Thematic Exploration of the Paintings in the Collection of Her Majesty the Queen. Sinclair-Stevenson, 1992.
- Shanes, Eric. The Life and Masterworks of J. M. W. Turner. Parkstone International, 2012.
