= The Village of Waterloo =

1821 painting by George Jones

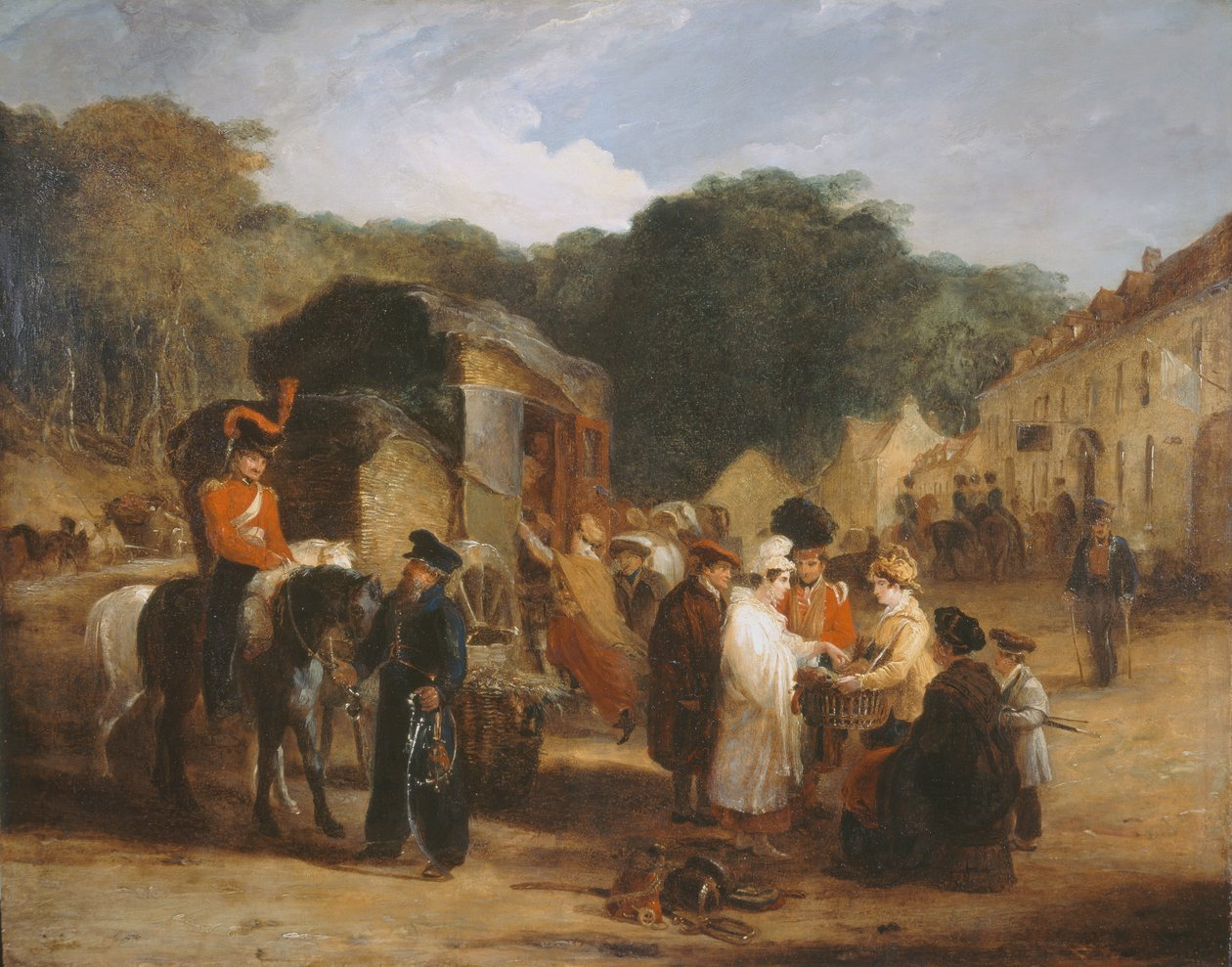
- Artist: George Jones
- Year: 1821
- Type: Oil on panel, history painting
- Dimensions: 49.5 cm × 62.1 cm (19.5 in × 24.4 in)
- Location: National Army Museum, London

The Village of Waterloo is an oil on panel history painting by the English artist George Jones, from 1821. It has the longer subtitle With Travellers Purchasing the Relics That Were Found in the Field of Battle, 1815.

== History and description ==
It shows a scene in the village of Waterloo In the immediate aftermath of the Battle of Waterloo during the Hundred Days campaign. Villagers are selling souvenirs of the campaign to a Highland soldier and tourists who have arrived by coach from Brussels. Meanwhile, a Prussian offers items to a mounted hussar. All have presumably been looted from corpses on the battlefield. Meanwhile, a cart filled with redcoated British bodies can be seen on the left while a group of lancers on horseback are clustered around an inn on the right.

Jones, a captain in the militia, visited the scene soon after the battle and made sketches. The battlefield became a major tourist destination over subsequent decades. It was part of cluster of paintings depicting the Waterloo Campaign produced around this time including David Wilkie's Chelsea Pensioners reading the Waterloo Dispatch. The work was displayed at the Royal Academy's Summer Exhibition at Somerset House. Today it is in the collection of the National Army Museum in London.

== Bibliography ==
- Buck, Pamela. Objects of Liberty: British Women Writers and Revolutionary Souvenirs. University of Delaware Press, 2004.
- Reynolds, Luke. Who Owned Waterloo?: Battle, Memory, and Myth in British History, 1815–1852. Oxford University Press, 2022.
- Tromans, Nicholas. David Wilkie: The People's Painter. Edinburgh University Press, 2007.
