= Banquet in the Thames Tunnel =

1827 painting by George Jones

- Artist: George Jones
- Year: 1827
- Type: Oil on board, history painting
- Dimensions: 37.5 cm × 32.5 cm (14.8 in × 12.8 in)
- Location: Ironbridge Gorge, Shropshire

Banquet in the Thames Tunnel is an 1827 history painting by the British artist George Jones. It depicts an event held in the Thames Tunnel then under construction between at Rotherhithe and Wapping in East London. On 10 November 1827 the shareholders hosted a banquet as publicity for the yet-to-be-completed tunnel. Amongst the guests was the Duke of Wellington who became Prime Minister the following year. In the foreground are Marc Isambard Brunel who designed the tunnel but did not actually attend the banquet, and his son Isambard Kingdom Brunel who worked as an engineer on the project. Having been accepted in lieu, the painting was allocated to the Ironbridge Gorge Museum Trust.

== Bibliography ==
- Ackroyd, Peter. London Under. Random House, 2012.
- Bagust, Harold. The Greater Genius?: A Biography of Marc Isambard Brunel. Ian Allan, 2006.
- Pike, David Lawrence. Metropolis on the Styx: The Underworlds of Modern Urban Culture, 1800-2001. Cornell University Press, 2007.
