= Edward Binyon =

Edward Binyon (16 March 1827 – 17 July 1876) was a 19th-century British landscape painter.

== Biography ==
Binyon was born in Manchester to Edward and Maria Binyon. He was a member of the Society of Friends. The poet Laurence Binyon was a cousin. He painted both in oil and in watercolour; his Bay of Mentone, was frequently reproduced.

Augustus Hare refers to Binyon teaching drawing in Menton in A winter at Mentone, published in 1862.

Having spent some time in Algeria and Morocco, Binyon arrived on the Italian island of Capri, where he was to spend the rest of his life, in 1867. There he met 18-year-old Maria Settanni. They married against her father's wishes, eloping to Naples, where the British consul helped to arrange their marriage. They had three children.

From 1857 to 1876 he, contributed to the exhibitions of the Dudley Gallery and the Royal Academy, among the pictures which he sent to the latter being, in 1859, The Arch of Titus; in 1860 Capri; in 1873 Marina di Lacco, Ischia; in 1875 Coral Boat at Dawn, Bay of Naples; and in 1876 Hidden Fires, Vesuvius from Capodimonte.

He died on Capri in 1876, from the effects of bathing while overheated.
