= George Jones (painter) =

English painter (1786–1869)

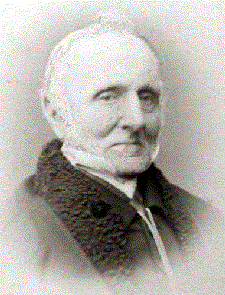
- Jones in c. 1860
- Born: 6 January 1786; London, England
- Died: September 19, 1869 (aged 83); London, England
- Known for: Painting
- Movement: Military art

George Jones RA (6 January 1786 – 19 September 1869) was an English painter who specialised in military art.

== Life ==
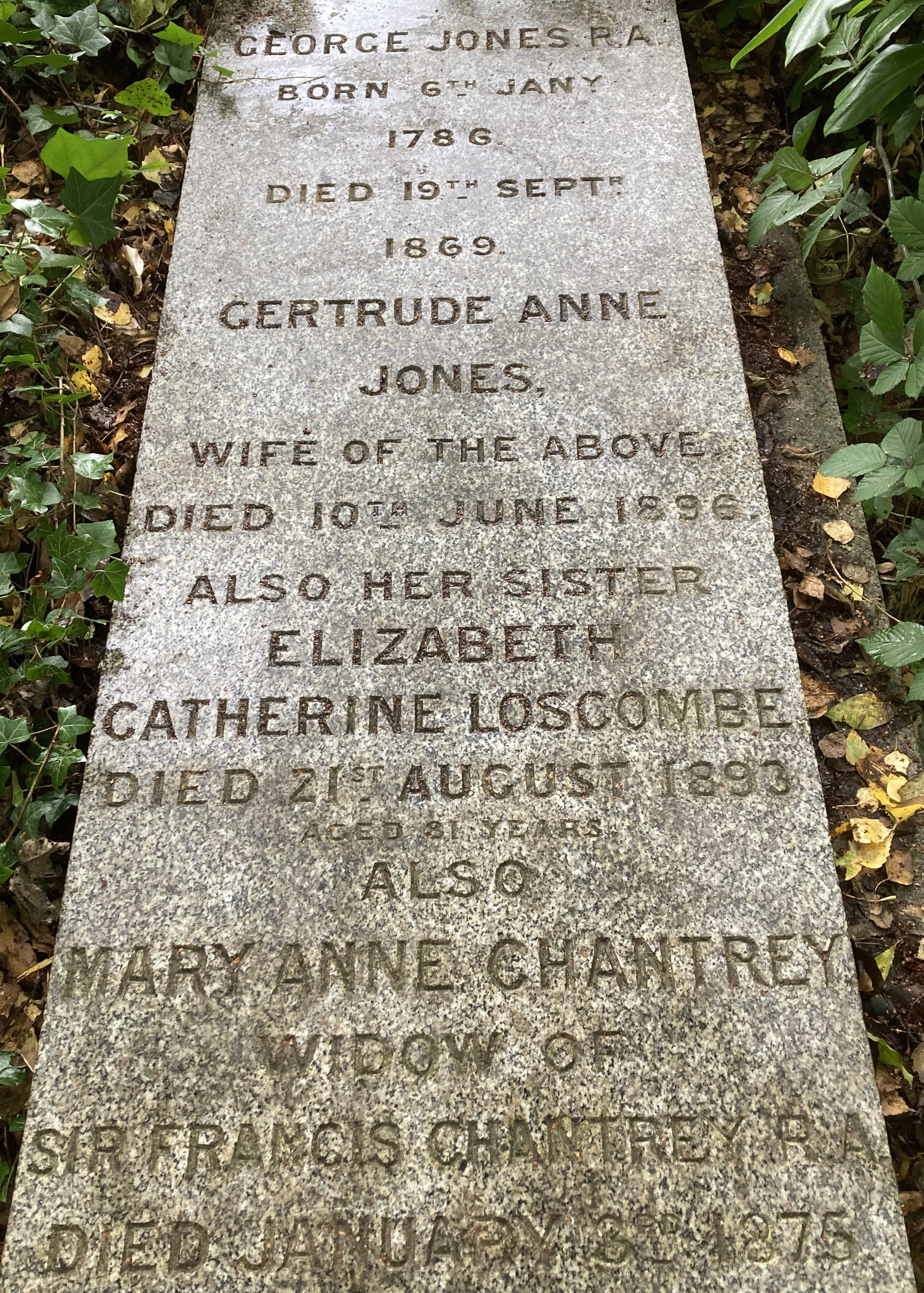
Family vault of George Jones in Highgate Cemetery

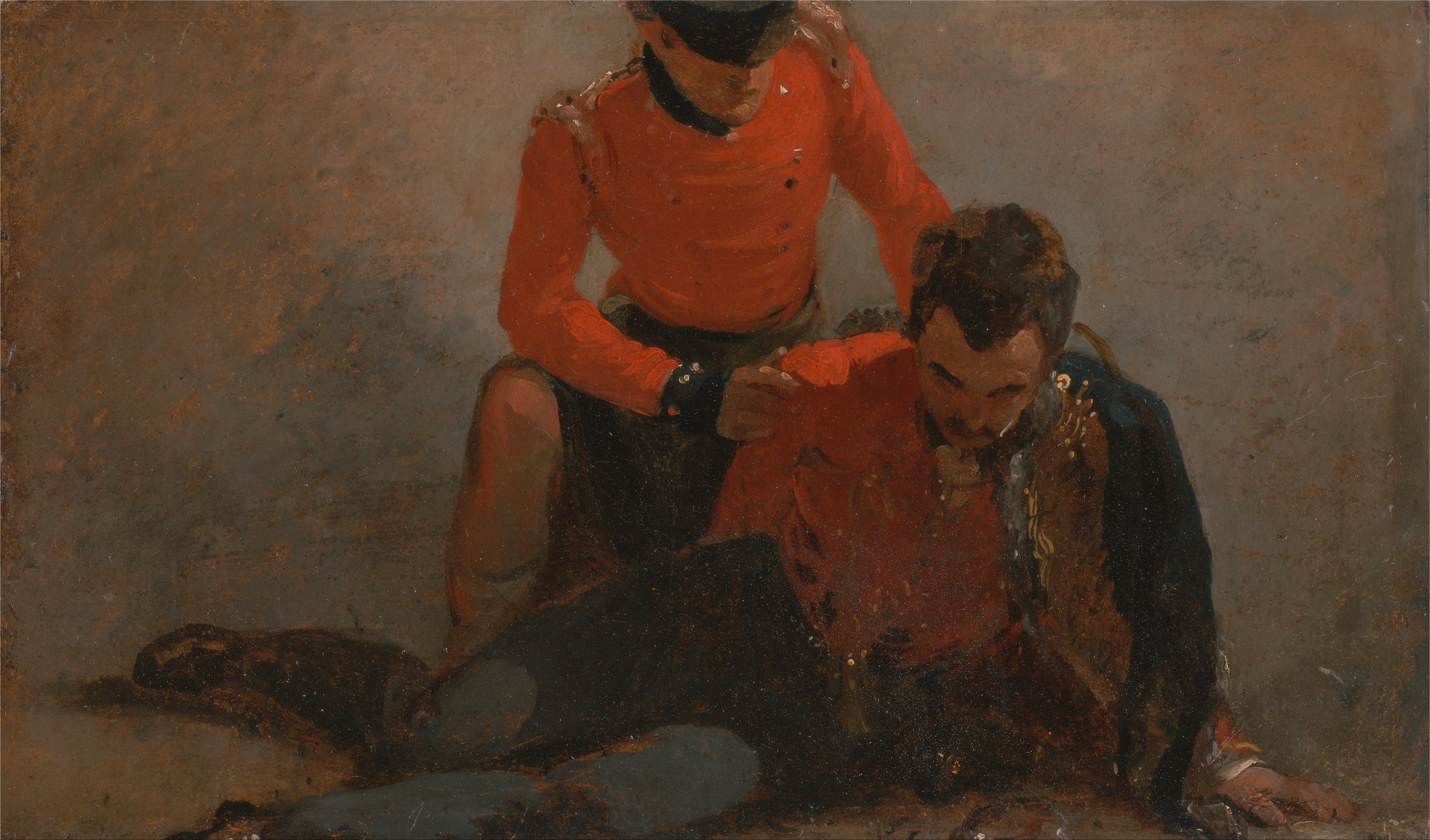
A compositional sketch depicting a member of the Black Watch attending a General of Hussars, possibly intended to be Lord Uxbridge at Waterloo, oil on board, 1815.

Jones was born in London, the only son of John Jones, a mezzotint engraver. He became a student at the Royal Academy Schools in 1801 at the early age of 15, exhibiting his first work depicting a biblical scene in 1803. He was a frequent exhibitor at the Royal Academy over the next eight years. He joined the Royal Montgomeryshire Militia; the date of his commission as captain is given as 17 February 1812. There is a possibility that he had served in the South Devon Militia as far back as 1808. His obituary states that he volunteered for active service with his company in Spain, but he was certainly part of the army of occupation in Paris after the Battle of Waterloo.

After the war he resumed his art career, winning prizes and fame for his paintings of military engagements. He was elected an associate of the Royal Academy in 1822, a full member in 1824, becoming its librarian, and from 1840 to 1850 its keeper. He was the friend of Charles Turner, engraver, and of J. M. W. Turner, whose most loyal executor he became, writing a short memoir of him and painting pictures recording his gallery. Unlike the two Turners he is unaccountably not commemorated on his former residences in London by any plaque.

He married Gertrude Anne Loscombe (died 1896) in 1844.

He died in Park Square, Regent's Park on 19 September 1869 and is buried on the western side of Highgate Cemetery.

=== Resemblance to Wellington ===
Jones bore a strong resemblance to his hero, Arthur Wellesley, 1st Duke of Wellington, and was sometimes mistaken for him. Jones was said to be very proud of his resemblance to the Duke. When Wellington was told about this he remarked, "Mistaken for me, is he? That's strange, for no one ever mistakes me for Mr. Jones". In fact, there is evidence that Wellington was once mistaken for Jones. When approached by a man who said "Mr Jones, I believe", Wellington replied, "if you will believe that you will believe anything."

== Work ==
=== Peninsular War paintings ===
While it is unknown whether Jones went to Spain, he did make the acquaintance of Lieut. Gen. Paul Anderson, who had fought in the Peninsular War. The latter had also been a friend of the late General Sir John Moore and was present at the death of the general at the Battle of Corunna. Anderson commissioned Jones to paint the burial scene and possibly two companion pieces. The artist also painted a scene of the Battle of Vitoria which is now in the Royal Collection.

=== Borodino and Waterloo paintings ===
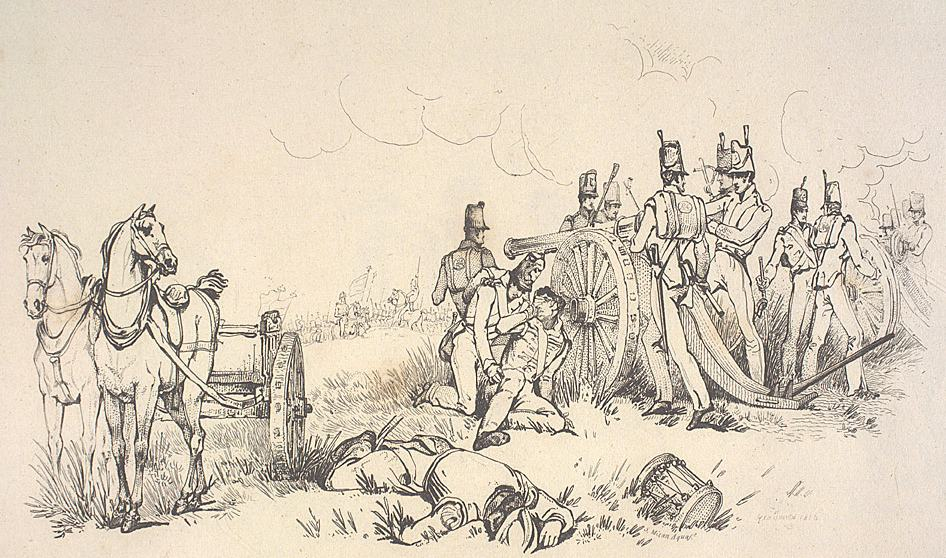
"The artillery officers had the range so accurately, that every shot and shell fell into the very centre of their masses."

Waterloo was particularly attractive to the artist and he exhibited no less than five paintings of the battle at the Royal Academy and six at the British Institution, earning the nickname 'Waterloo' Jones. His 1816 piece at the BI was for the competition for the best rendition of the battle, for which he won the second prize of 200 guineas. His presence in the latter stages of the campaign clearly helped him and he made numerous sketches of the battlefield and surroundings; some of these were used in a book entitled The Battle of Waterloo...By a Near Observer published in 1817. In 1829, Jones painted a large scene of Borodino, while from the same year came his scene entitled Nelson boarding the 'San Josef' at St. Vincent.

=== Scinde Campaign paintings ===
Jones was friendly with William Napier, brother of General Sir Charles Napier, and following the victories in Scinde in 1842–1843, William asked Jones to paint a scene in support of his brother who was being criticised for supposedly creating the war to further his own ambitions. Jones painted several scenes including the Battle of Meanee, the Battle of Hydrabad, the Battle of Trukee and the destruction of the fortress at Emaum Ghur.

=== Crimean War paintings ===
The subject of the Crimean War appealed to Jones who exhibited two preliminary oil sketches at the Royal Academy in 1855 entitled The battle of the Alma and Balaclava 1854 - conflict at the guns. Four years later, the artist submitted another picture entitled The Battle of Inkermann.

=== Indian Mutiny paintings ===
Just as the Scinde paintings were created to celebrate a general, Jones painted several scenes of the Indian Mutiny to honor Sir Colin Campbell. The first piece was entitled Contest in the Raptee river between the 7th Hussars, commanded by Sir W. Russell, and the Sowars. His two major paintings depicted Lucknow and Cawnpore.

=== Abyssinian Campaign ===
In the final year of his life, Jones produced a watercolor depicting The conquest and destruction of Magdala.

== Gallery ==
The Prince Regent Received by the University and City of Oxford, 1815

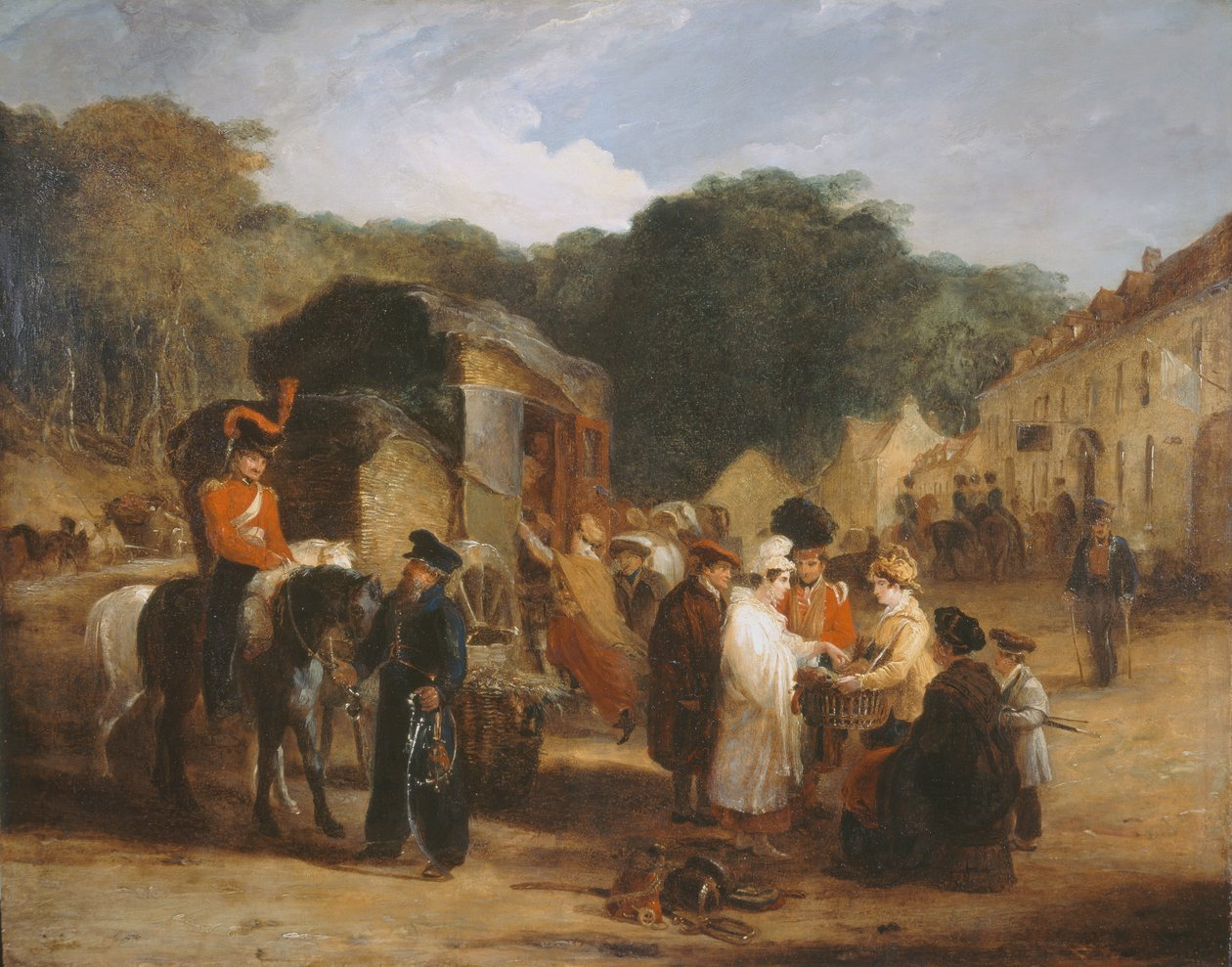
The Village of Waterloo, 1821

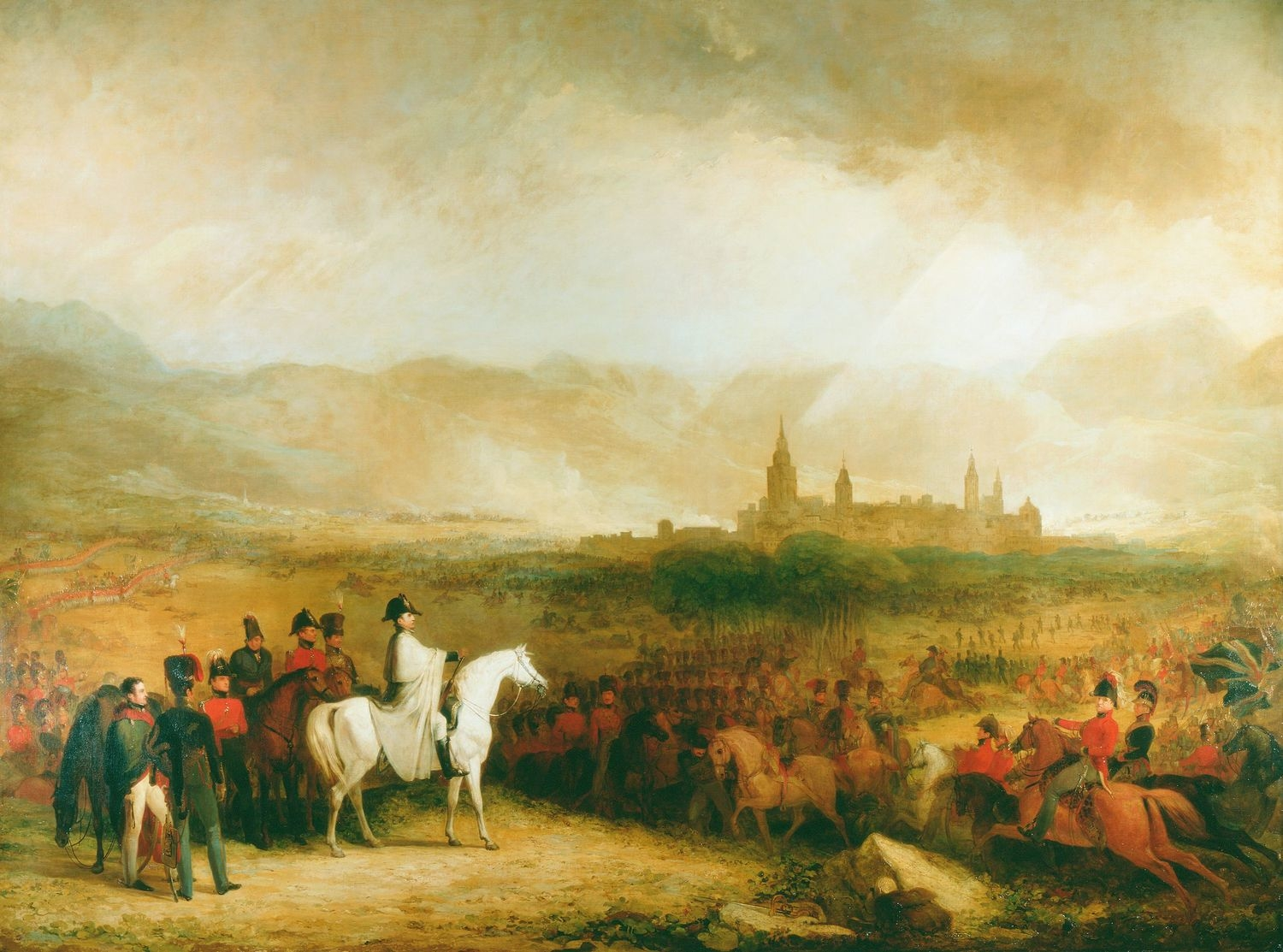
The Battle of Vittoria, 1822

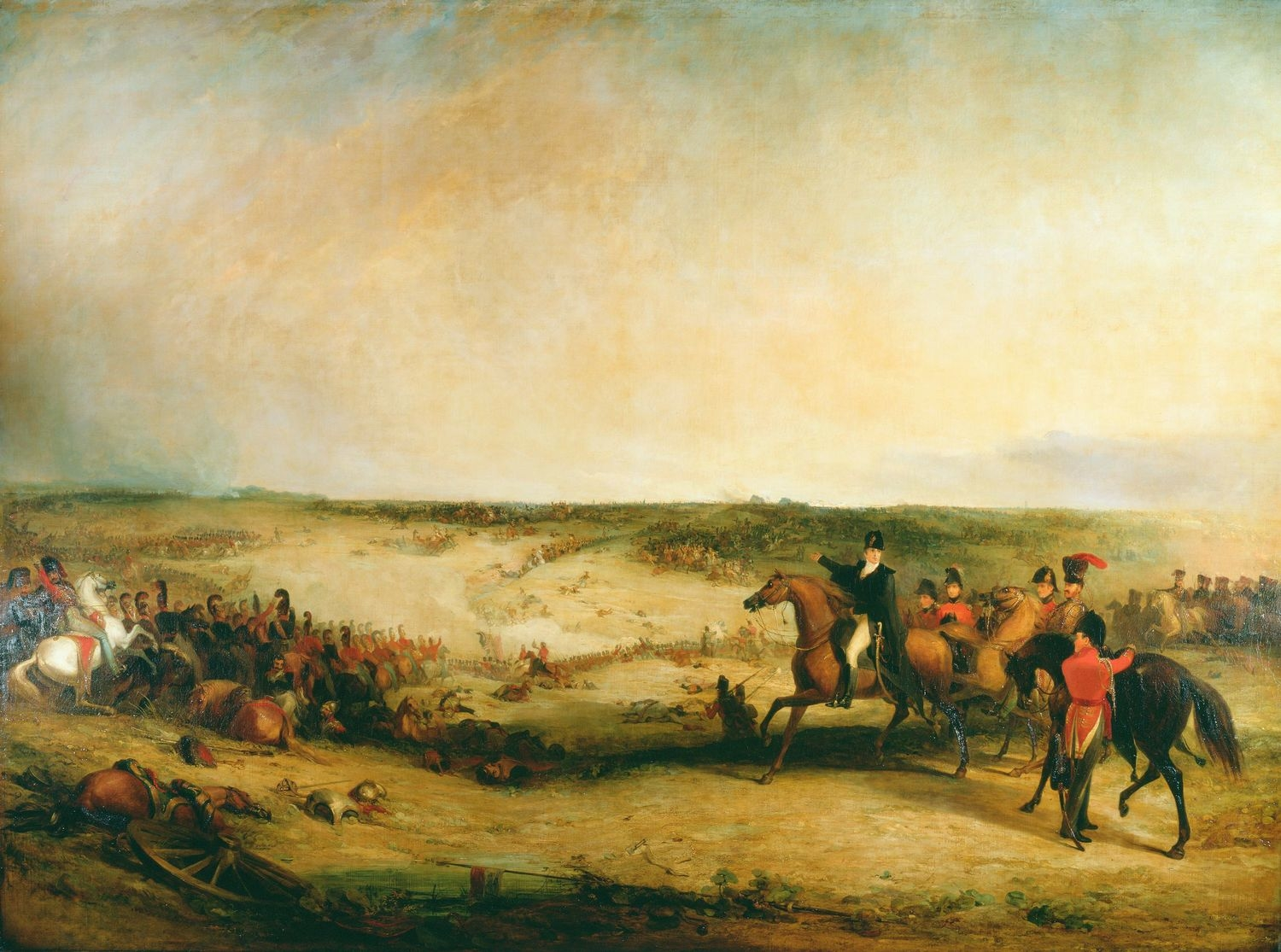
The Battle of Waterloo, 1822

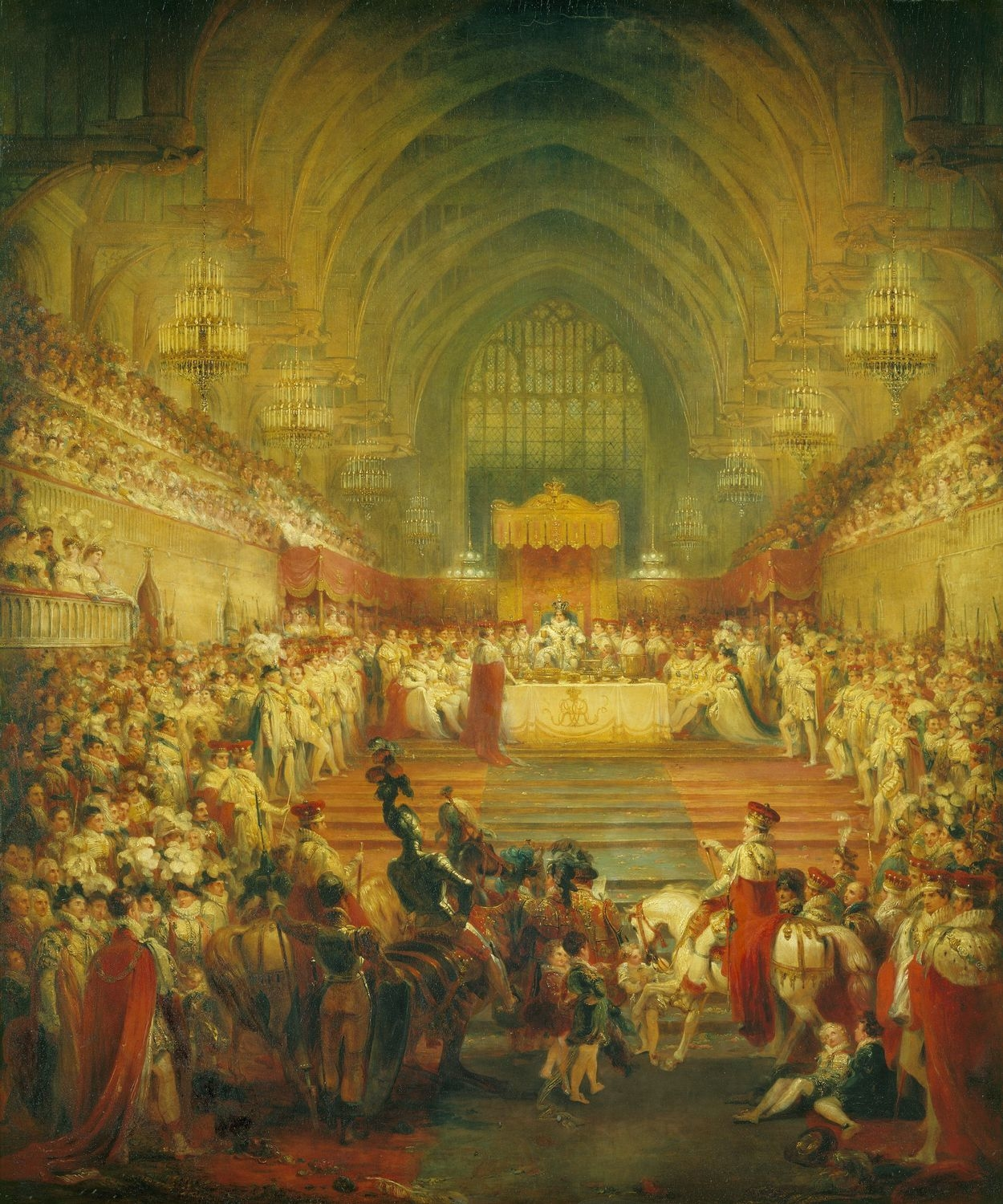
The Banquet at the Coronation of George IV, 1822

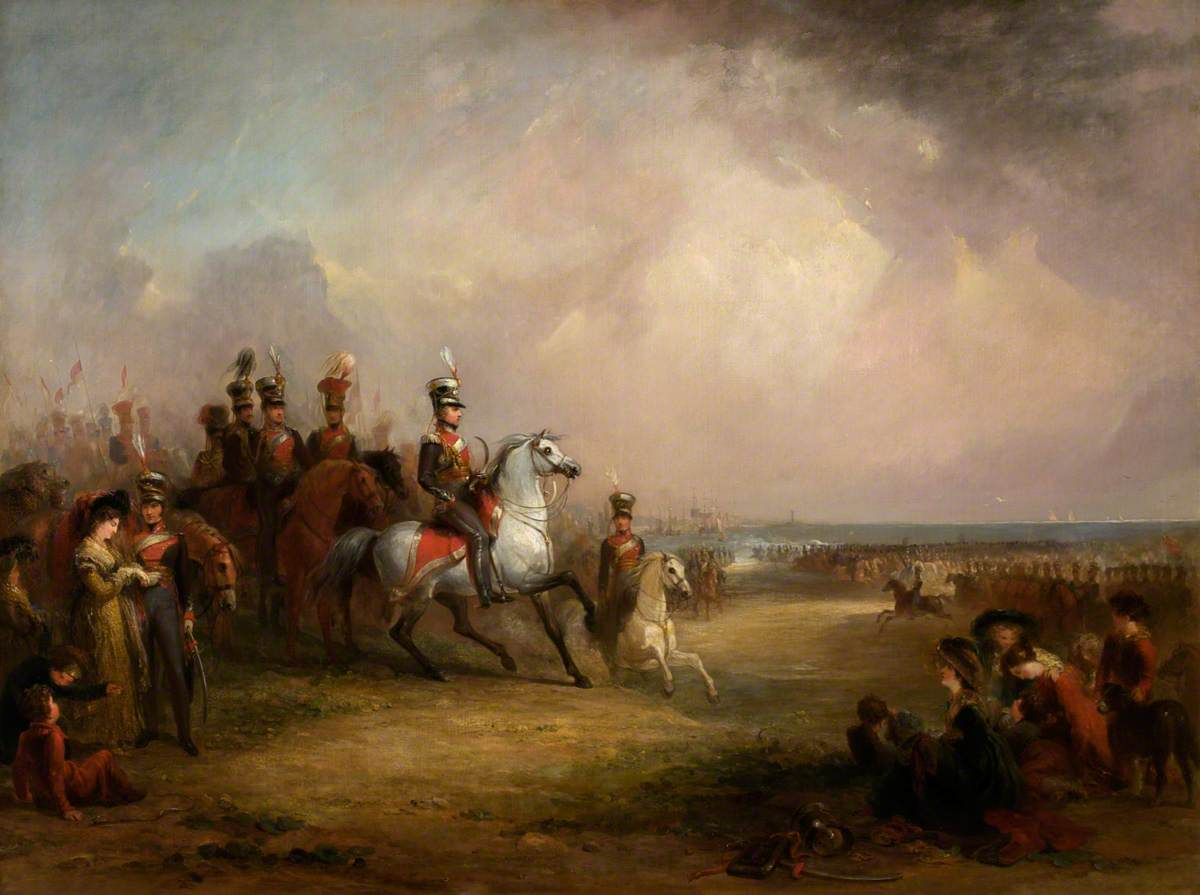
Sir John Leicester and the Cheshire Yeomanry Exercising on the Sands at Liverpool 1824

Banquet in the Thames Tunnel, 1827

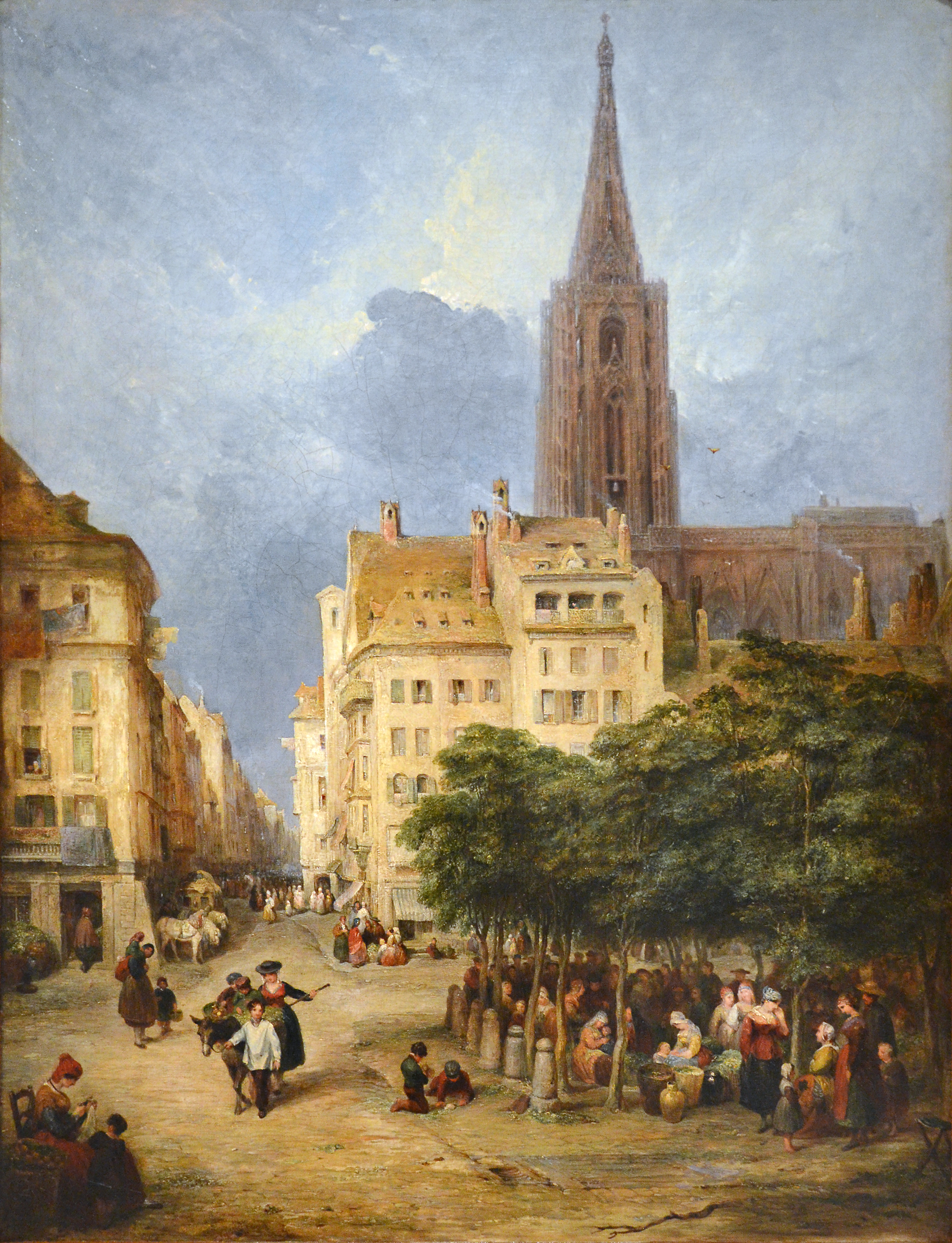
A View of Strasbourg, 1827

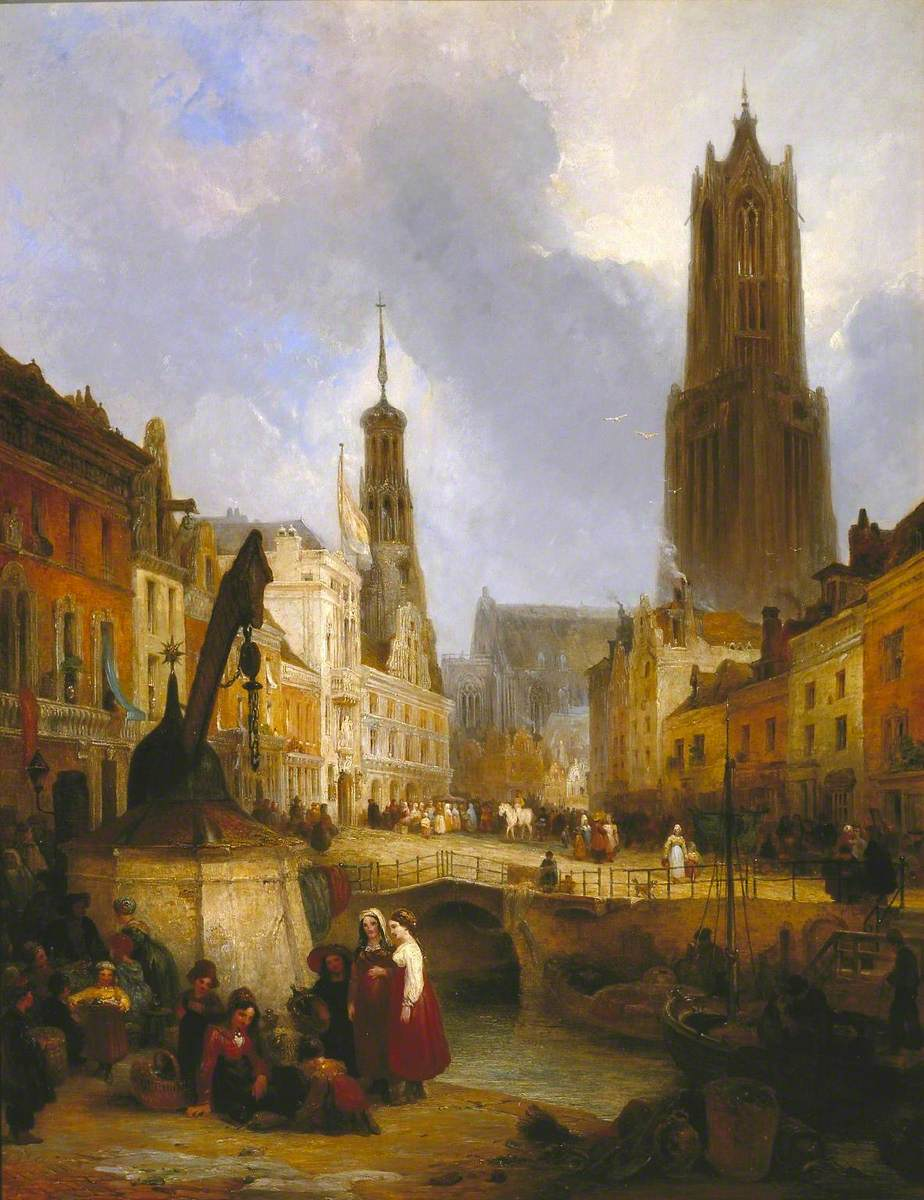
Utrecht, 1829

Nelson Boarding the San Josef, 1829

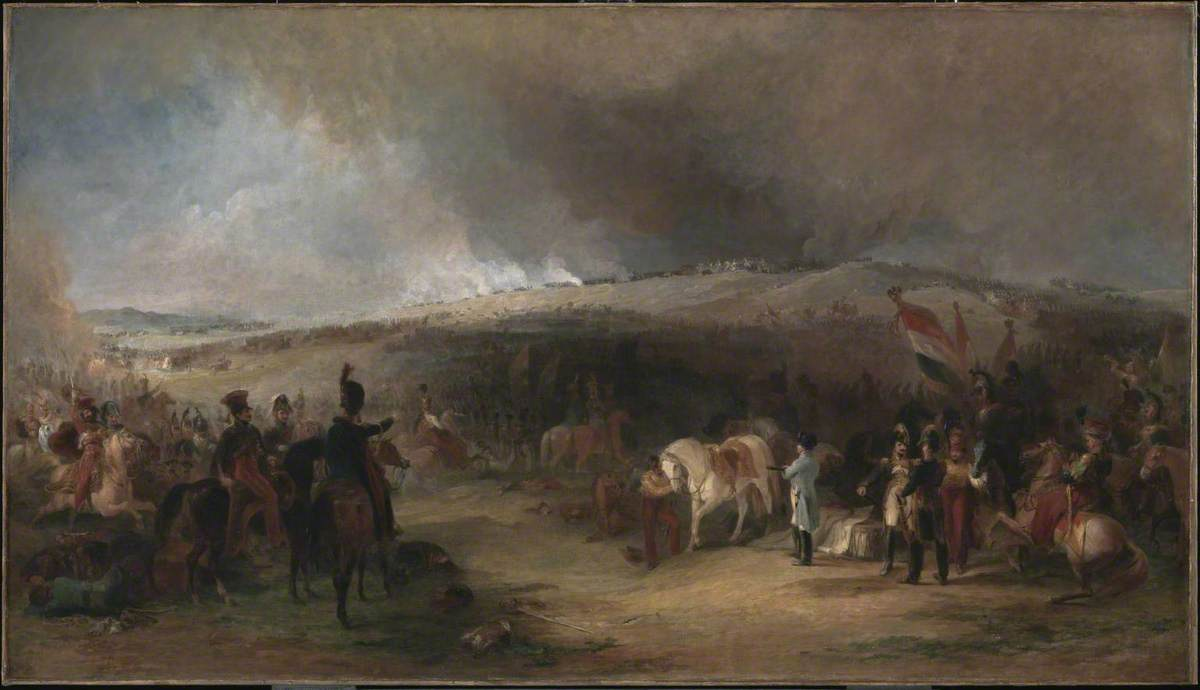
The Battle of Borodino, 1829

The Opening of London Bridge, 1832

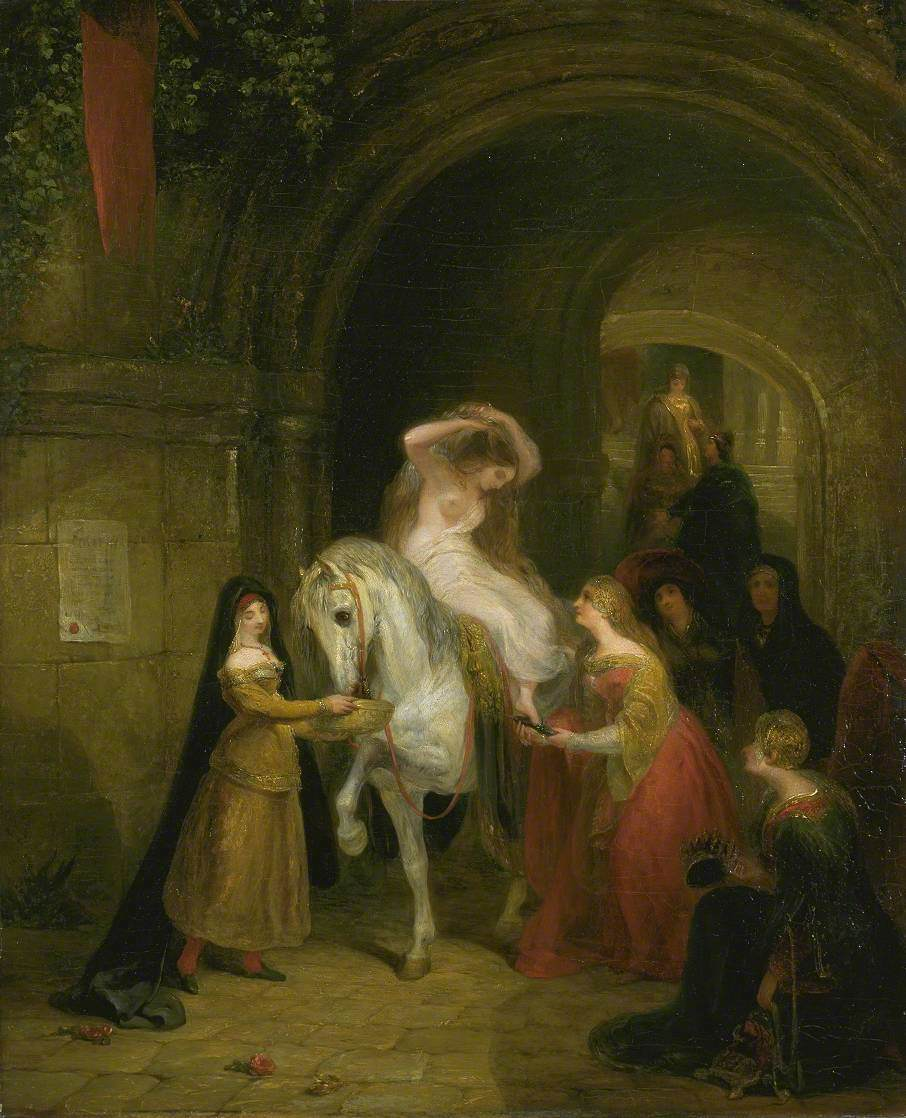
Godiva Preparing to Ride through Coventry, 1833

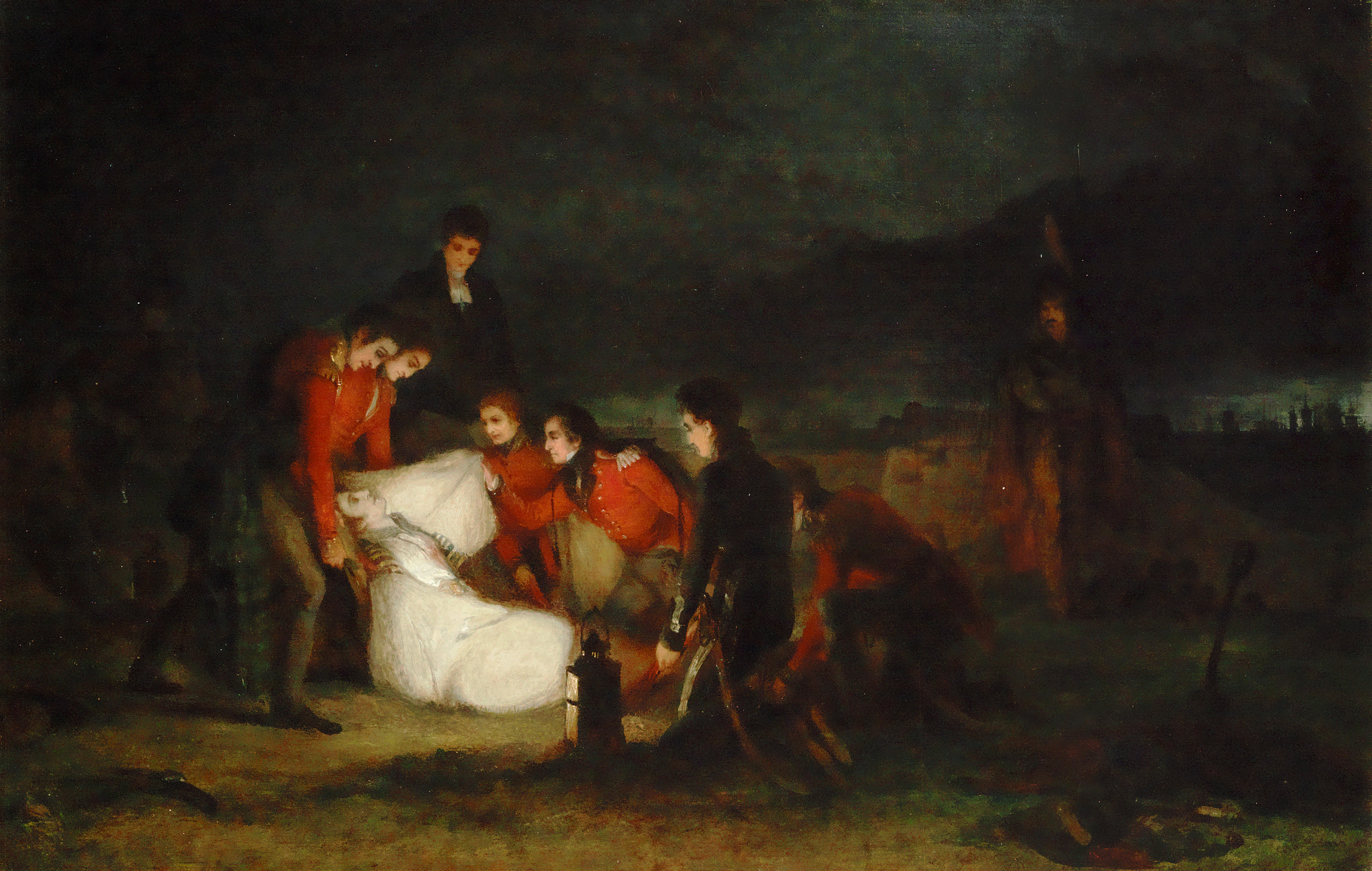
The Burial of Sir John Moore after Corunna, 1834

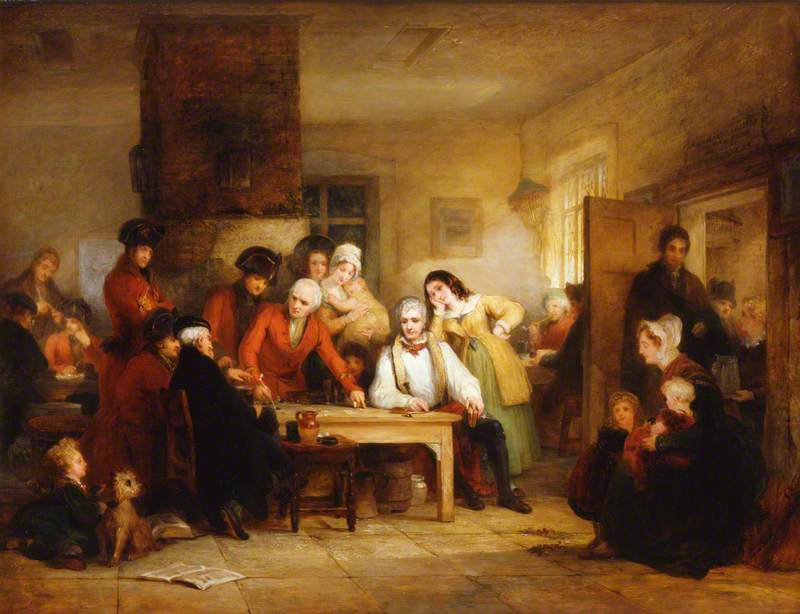
The Smoking House at Chelsea Hospital, 1834

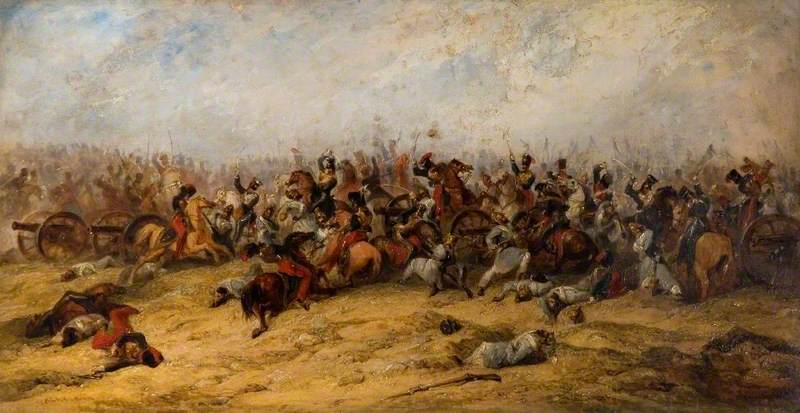
The Conflict at the Guns, Balaclava, 1854

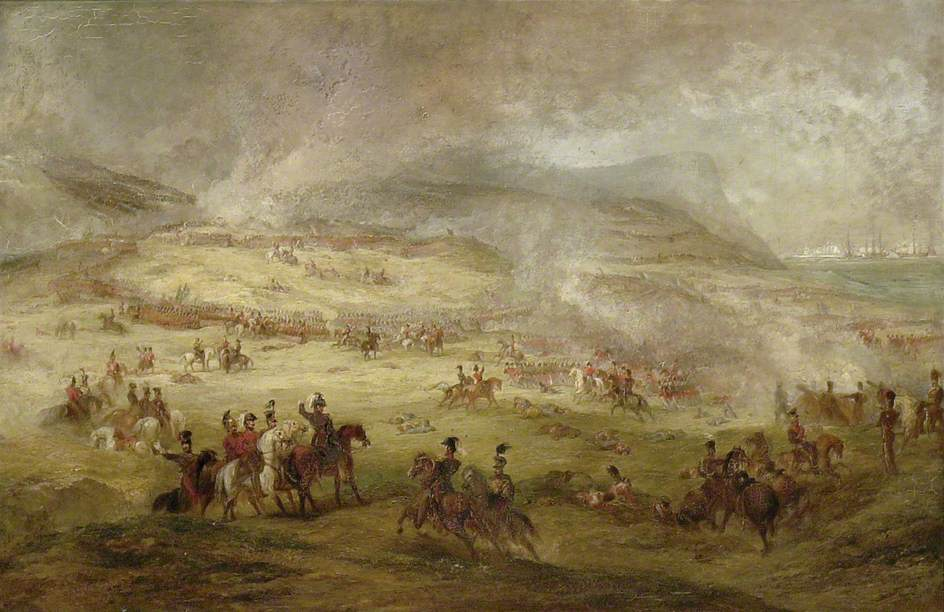
The Battle of the Alma, 1855
