= Combat of Croix d'Orade =

Skirmish in the Peninsular War in 1814

Date	8 April 1814
Location	Near Toulouse, Haute-Garonne
Result	British victory

Belligerents
United Kingdom of Great Britain and Ireland	First French Empire

Commanders and leaders
(United Kingdom) Lord Wellington (United Kingdom) Charles Alten (United Kingdom) Henry Murray (United Kingdom) Hussey Vivian	(First French Empire) Jean-de-Dieu Soult (First French Empire) Jean Isidore Harispe

Units involved
(United Kingdom) 18th Hussars (United Kingdom) 95 th Regiment; 52nd Regiment	GB Charles Guillaume Vial d'Alais's Brigade; Engineers and Sappiers

Strength
400 cavalry; 400–900 infantry; 150–200 sappier/engineers	200–300 infantry; 30–50 engineers; 1,600–2,000 cavalry (reserves)

Casualties and losses
10–30	50–120 killed or wounded; 100+ captured

The Combat of Croix d'Orade was a skirmish that took place near Toulouse on 8 April 1814 during the Peninsular War. In a charge, the British 18th Hussars under Lieutenant-colonel Sir Henry Murray seized the bridge at Croix d'Orade on the river Ers in southern France.

== Background ==
In April 1814, during the final stages of the Peninsular War, the coalition forces under Field Marshal Lord Wellington advanced towards Toulouse, a key French stronghold defended by Jean-de-Dieu Soult. The terrain surrounding the city, particularly the Ers River, the Mont Rave heights, and the canal system, posed significant tactical challenges.

Soult had anticipated Wellington's approach and prepared a layered defense to channel and delay the allied advance. All bridges over the Ers were destroyed except the one at Croix d'Orade, which had been seized by allied forces on 8 April. This forced Wellington to consider a flank march under fire, maneuvering between the Ers and Mont Rave to reach the canal above the suburb of Guillemerie.

== Combat ==
On 8 April, the waters subsided, the allies' bridge was again laid down, Freire's Spaniards and the Portuguese artillery crossed, and Wellington was taking the command in person advanced to the heights of Fenoulhiet within five miles of Toulouse. Marching up both banks of the Ers, his columns were separated by that river, which was impassable without pontoons, and it was essential to secure as soon as possible one of the stone bridges. Hence, when his left approached the heights of Kirie Eleison, on the great road of Alby, Vivian's horsemen drove Berton's cavalry up the right of the Ers towards the bridge of Bordes, and the 18th hussars descended towards that of Croix d'Orade. The latter was defended by Vial's dragoons, and after some skirmishing, the Hussars were suddenly menaced by a regiment in front of the bridge, the opposite bank of the river being lined with dismounted carbineers. The two armies begin to engage due to the approach of some British infantry, when both sides sounded a charge at the same moment, but the British horses were so quick that the French were in an instant jammed up on the bridge, their front ranks were brutally charged and sabred, and the mass of the rear guard fled, leaving many killed and wounded and above a hundred Frenchmen captured.

== Aftermath ==
Vivian was severely wounded during the engagement. There were about 300 casualties combined. The successful seizure and retention of the Croix d'Orade bridge enabled the Allied army to maneuver between the Ers and Mont Rave, bypassing Soult's primary defenses. Though the broader Battle of Toulouse remained tactically indecisive, the combat at Croix d'Orade proved strategically pivotal.
