= 1832 in art =

Events from the year 1832 in art.

== Events ==
- 7 May – The Royal Academy Exhibition of 1832 opens at Somerset House
- New Society of Painters in Water Colours holds its first exhibition, in London.

== Awards ==
- Prix de Rome
  - for painting – Antoine Wiertz
  - for sculpture – François Jouffroy

== Works ==
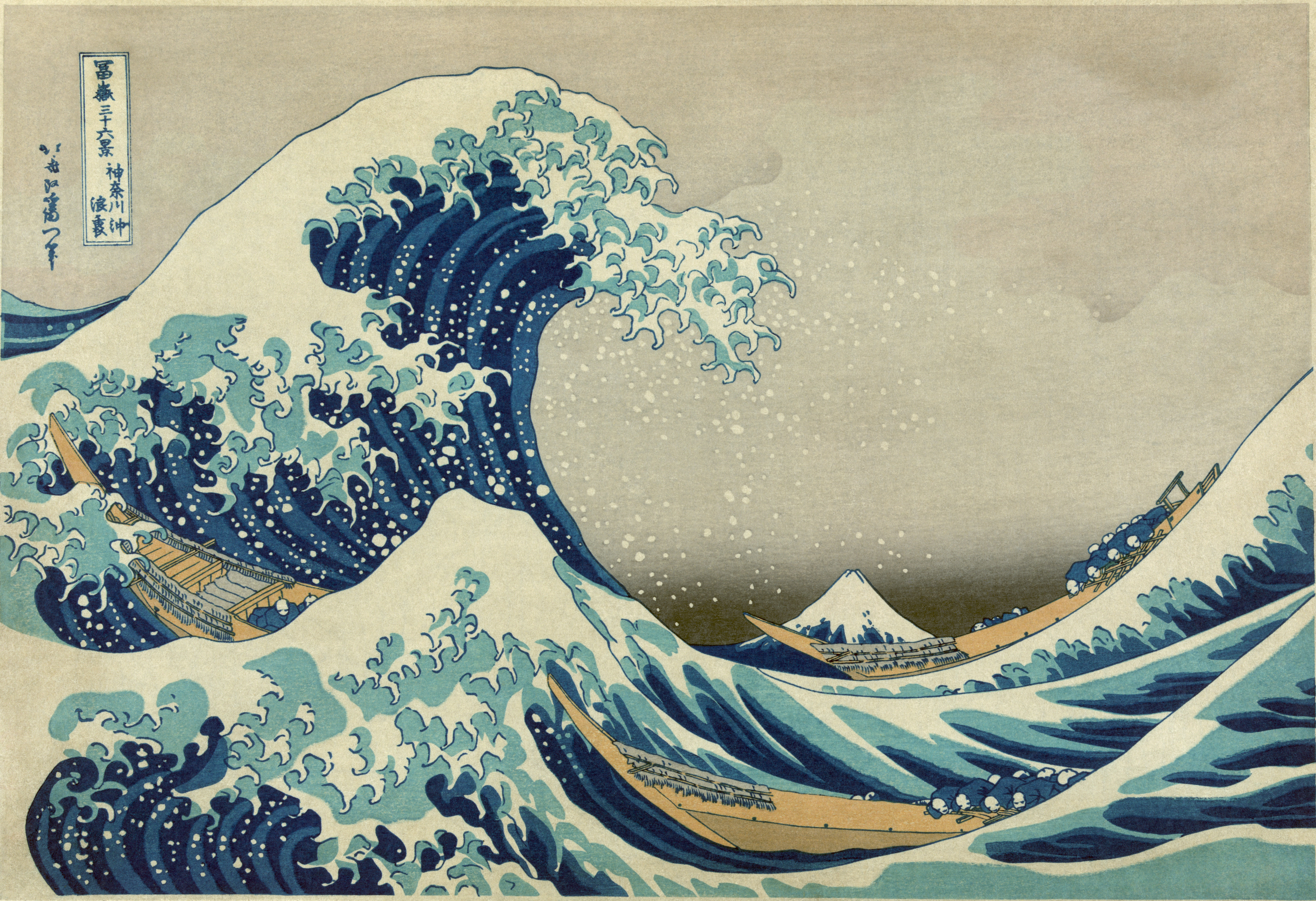
Katsushika Hokusai, The Great Wave off Kanagawa from the Thirty-six Views of Mount Fuji color woodcut, 10 1/8 × 14 15/16 inches (25.7 x 37.9 cm); Metropolitan Museum of Art, New York

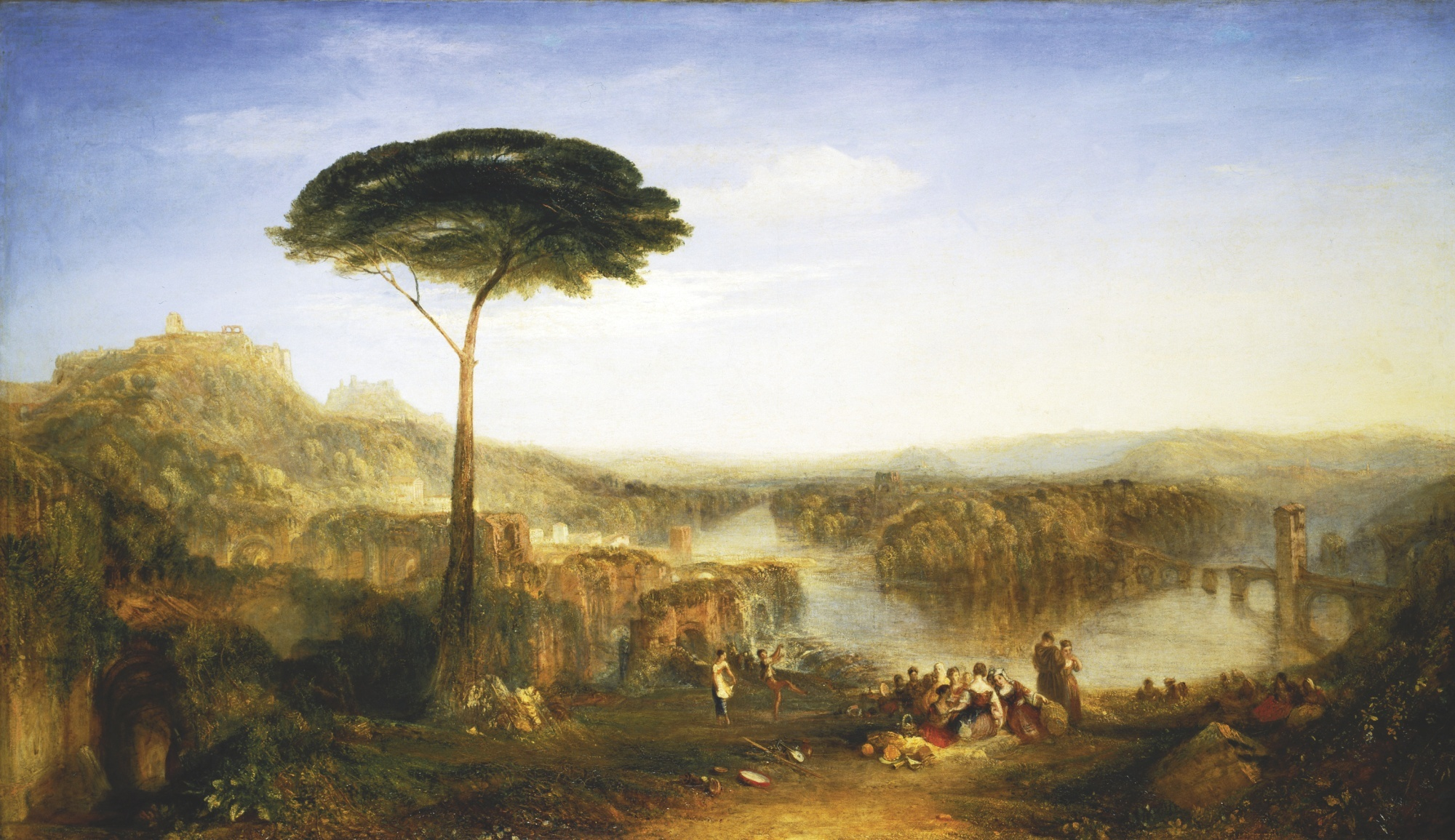
J. M. W. Turner, Childe Harold's Pilgrimage - Italy.

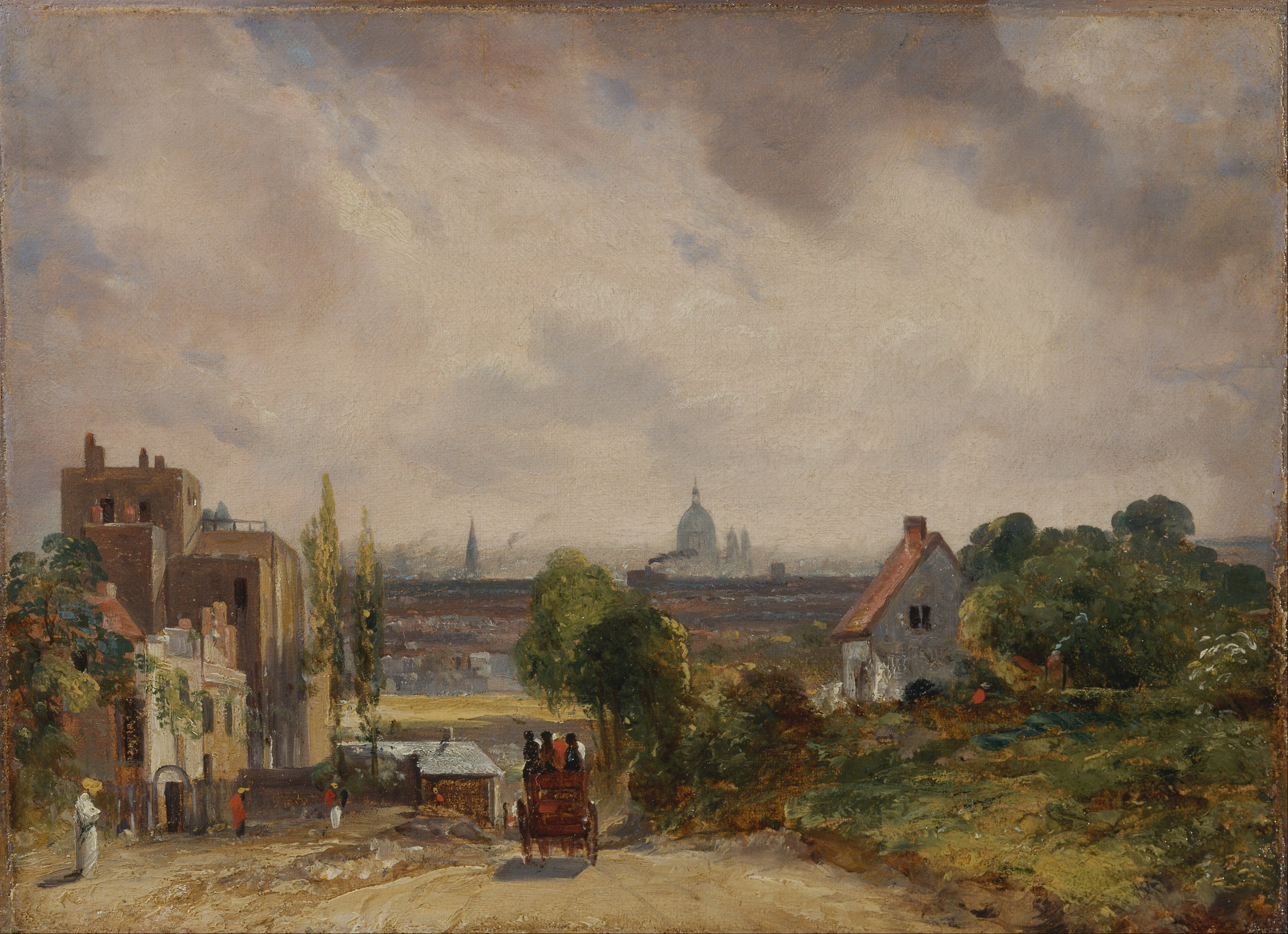
John Constable, Sir Richard Steele's Cottage, Hampstead.

- Martin Archer Shee – Portrait of Thomas Denman
- Louis-Léopold Boilly – A Carnival Scene
- William Collins – Rustic Civility
- John Constable
  - Englefield House
  - The Opening of Waterloo Bridge
  - Sir Richard Steele's Cottage, Hampstead
- Alexandre-Gabriel Decamps – The Watering Place
- William Etty
  - The Destroying Angel and Daemons of Evil Interrupting the Orgies of the Vicious and Intemperate
  - Phaedria and Cymochles
  - Youth on the Prow, and Pleasure at the Helm
- Francesco Hayez – Mary Stuart Proclaiming Her Innocence
- Auguste Hervieu – Portrait of Frances Trollope
- Hokusai – The Great Wave off Kanagawa
- Jean Auguste Dominique Ingres – Portrait of Monsieur Bertin
- Henry Inman - "Pes-Ke-Le-Cha-Co"
- George Jones – The Opening of London Bridge
- Edwin Landseer
  - Hawking in the Olden Time
  - Lady Blessington's Dog
- James Arthur O'Connor – A Thunderstorm: The Frightened Wagoner
- Joseph Paelinck – Juno
- Jan Willem Pieneman – Portrait of General David Hendrik Chassé
- David Roberts – The Great Staircase, Stafford House
- Clarkson Stanfield – The Opening of New London Bridge
- J. M. W. Turner
  - Childe Harold's Pilgrimage - Italy
  - Christ Driving the Traders from the Temple
  - Helvoetsluys
  - Staffa, Fingal's Cave
  - The Prince of Orange Landing at Torbay
- Horace Vernet
  - The Duke of Orleans Leaving the Palais-Royal
  - Raphael at the Vatican
- Richard Westmacott - Statue of George Canning, Parliament Square
- David Wilkie
  - Portrait of William IV
  - The Preaching of John Knox Before the Lords of the Congregation

== Births ==
- January 6 – Gustave Doré, French illustrator (died 1883)
- January 23 – Édouard Manet, French painter, (died 1883)
- January 27 – Arthur Hughes, English Pre-Raphaelite painter (died 1915)
- February 21 – Louis Maurer, German American lithographer (died 1932 age 100)
- March 4 – Samuel Colman, American Hudson River school painter (died 1920)
- May 12 – Carl von Perbandt, German landscape painter (died 1911)
- June 1 – Henrietta Ward, English painter (died 1924)
- July 3 – Louis-Charles Verwee, Belgian painter (died 1882)
- July 27 – Đura Jakšić, Serbian painter and poet (died 1878)
- November 15 – Hermann Ottomar Herzog, German American landscape painter (died 1932)
- December 12 – Mauritz de Haas, Dutch American marine painter (died 1895)
- George Anderson Lawson, Scottish-born sculptor (died 1904)
- Approximate date – Emma Brownlow, English genre painter (died 1905)

== Deaths ==
- February 2 – Amos Doolittle, American engraver (born 1752)
- February 22
  - Christina Charlotta Cederström, Swedish artist, poet, and baroness (born 1760)
  - Asensio Juliá, Spanish painter and engraver (born 1760)
- March 13 – Aleksander Orłowski, Polish painter and sketch maker, pioneer of lithography in the Russian Empire (born 1777)
- March 22 – Johann Wolfgang von Goethe, German writer and art critic (born 1749)
- March 30 – Dora Stock, German portrait painter (born 1760)
- March 31 – Antoni Brodowski, Polish Neo-classicist painter and pedagogue (born 1784)
- April 13
  - Jean-Baptiste Jacques Augustin, French miniature painter (born 1759)
  - Joseph Barney, English painter (born 1753)
- April 22 – Guillaume Guillon-Lethière, French neoclassical painter (born 1760)
- April 23 – François-Nicolas Delaistre, French sculptor (born 1746)
- May 7 – Charles Guillaume Alexandre Bourgeois, French physicist and painter (born 1759)
- June 24 – Nicolas-Marie Gatteaux, French medal engraver (born 1751)
- August 17 – James Bisset, Scottish-born artist, manufacturer, writer, collector, art dealer and poet (born 1762)
- September 22
  - Philibert-Louis Debucourt, French painter and engraver (born 1755)
  - William Fowler, English artist (born 1761)
- October 14 – Johann Heinrich Meyer, Swiss painter and art writer (born 1760)
- date unknown:
  - Edme Bovinet, French engraver (born 1767)
  - John Comerford, Irish miniature painter (born 1773)
  - Augustin Félix Fortin, French painter of landscapes, and of genre and historical subjects (born 1763)
  - Robert Havell, Sr., English engraver and publisher (born 1769)
  - Anna Rajecka, Polish painter and drawing artist (born 1762)
