= The Opening of London Bridge =

Painting by George Jones

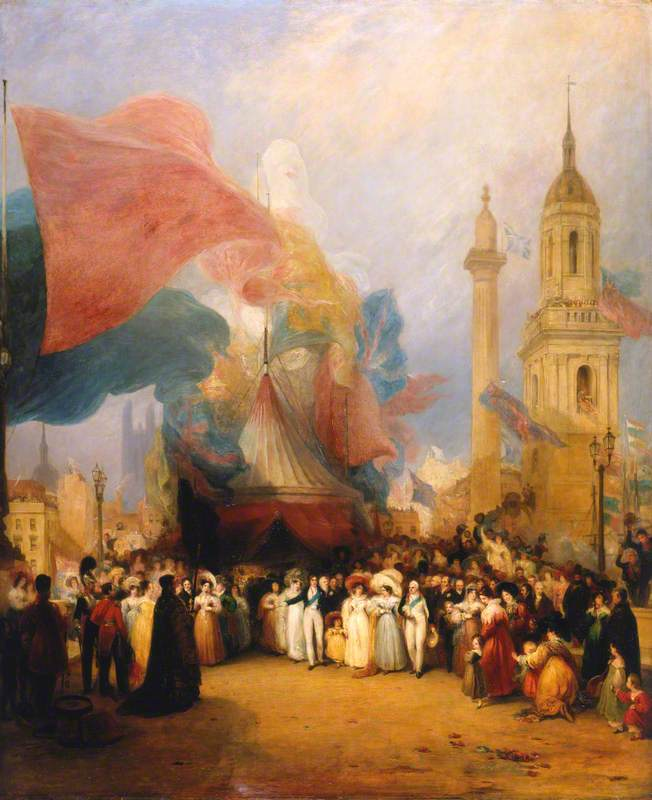
- Artist: George Jones
- Year: 1832
- Type: Oil on panel, history painting
- Dimensions: 127 cm × 107 cm (50 in × 42 in)
- Location: Sir John Soane's Museum, London

The Opening of London Bridge is an 1832 history painting by the British artist George Jones. It depicts the ceremonial opening of the new London Bridge on 1 August 1831. Based on a design by John Rennie the new structure replaced the old Medieval crossing of the River Thames. It features the royal party led by William IV. The Monument and the tower of St Magnus are prominent in the background. Jones also added in portraits of the architect John Soane and friends such as the sculptor Francis Chantrey and painter J.M.W. Turner. It is also known by the longer title The Royal Procession at the Opening of the New London Bridge.

Jones displayed the painting at the Royal Academy Exhibition of 1832 at Somerset House. Clarkson Stanfield also exhibited a similar work The Opening of New London Bridge. John Constable, whose main entry The Opening of Waterloo Bridge had taken more than a decade to produce. This led to the mistaken belief it also depicted the more recent opening of the new London Bridge.

The work was commissioned by Soane for his house in Lincoln's Inn Fields, now the Sir John Soane's Museum.

== Bibliography ==
- Moorby, Nichola. Turner and Constable: Art, Life, Landscape. Yale University Press, 2025.
- Solkin, David H. (ed.) Art on the Line: The Royal Academy Exhibitions at Somerset House, 1780-1836. Courthald Gallery, 2001
