= Helvoetsluys (painting) =

Painting by J. M. W. Turner

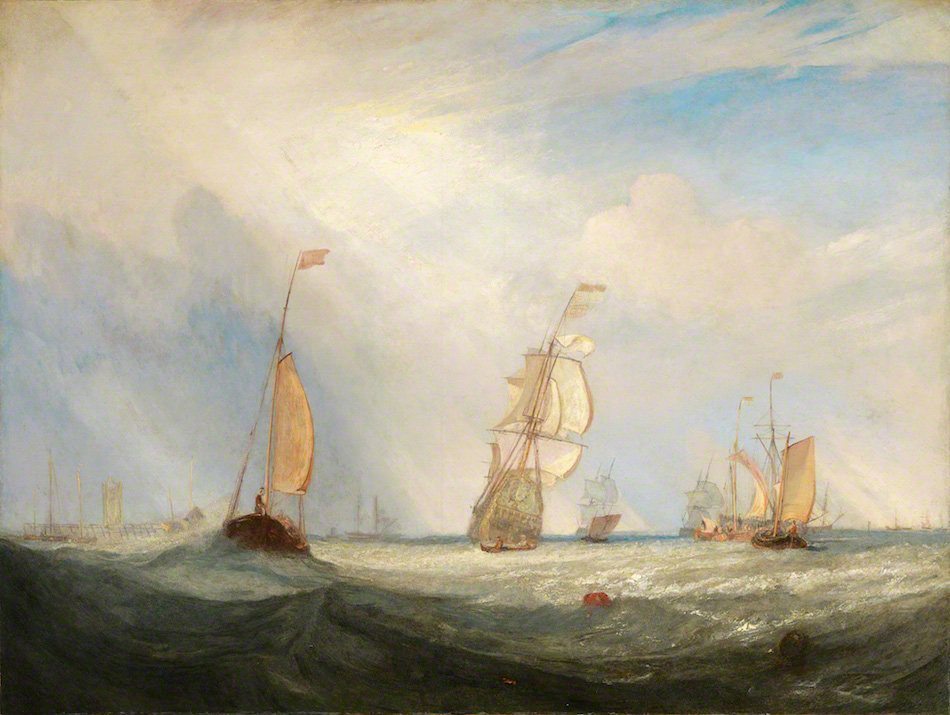
- Artist: J. M. W. Turner
- Year: 1832
- Type: Oil on canvas, landscape painting
- Dimensions: 91.4 cm × 122 cm (36.0 in × 48 in)
- Location: Fuji Art Museum, Tokyo

Helvoetsluys (Dutch pronunciation: [ˌɦɛlvutˈslœys]; English pronunciation: /ˈhɛlvʊtslaɪs/ or HELL-voot-slyss), the full title of which is Helvoetsluys; The City of Utrecht, 64, Going to Sea, is an 1832 oil painting by the British artist J.M.W. Turner.

A seascape, the painting features a view near the port of Hellevoetsluis in Holland with a ship of the line from the Dutch Navy, notably including a red buoy floating in the foreground.

== History ==
In 1832, the painting was submitted to the Royal Academy Exhibition of 1832 held at Somerset House in London. It was hung beside John Constable's painting The Opening of Waterloo Bridge, 1817, on which he had been working for more than a decade, having started within two years after the depicted event. It led to a famous exchange between them on Varnishing day.

In 1844, Elhanan Bicknell bought the painting directly from Turner, beginning a long period of private ownership.

In 1971, the painting was acquired by the University Art Museum in Bloomington, Indiana.

In 1983, the new Fuji Art Museum (TFAM) in Tokyo acquired the painting as a centerpiece for its permanent collection of Western art.

In 2019, the painting was briefly loaned to the Royal Academy of Arts so that it could hang alongside Constable's The Opening of Waterloo Bridge.

== See also ==
- List of paintings by J. M. W. Turner

== Bibliography ==
- Bailey, Anthony (2013). J.M.W. Turner: Standing in the Sun. Tate Enterprises Ltd.
- Hamilton, James (1998). Turner - A Life. Sceptre.
