= Cargill and Touchwood =

Painting by William Mulready

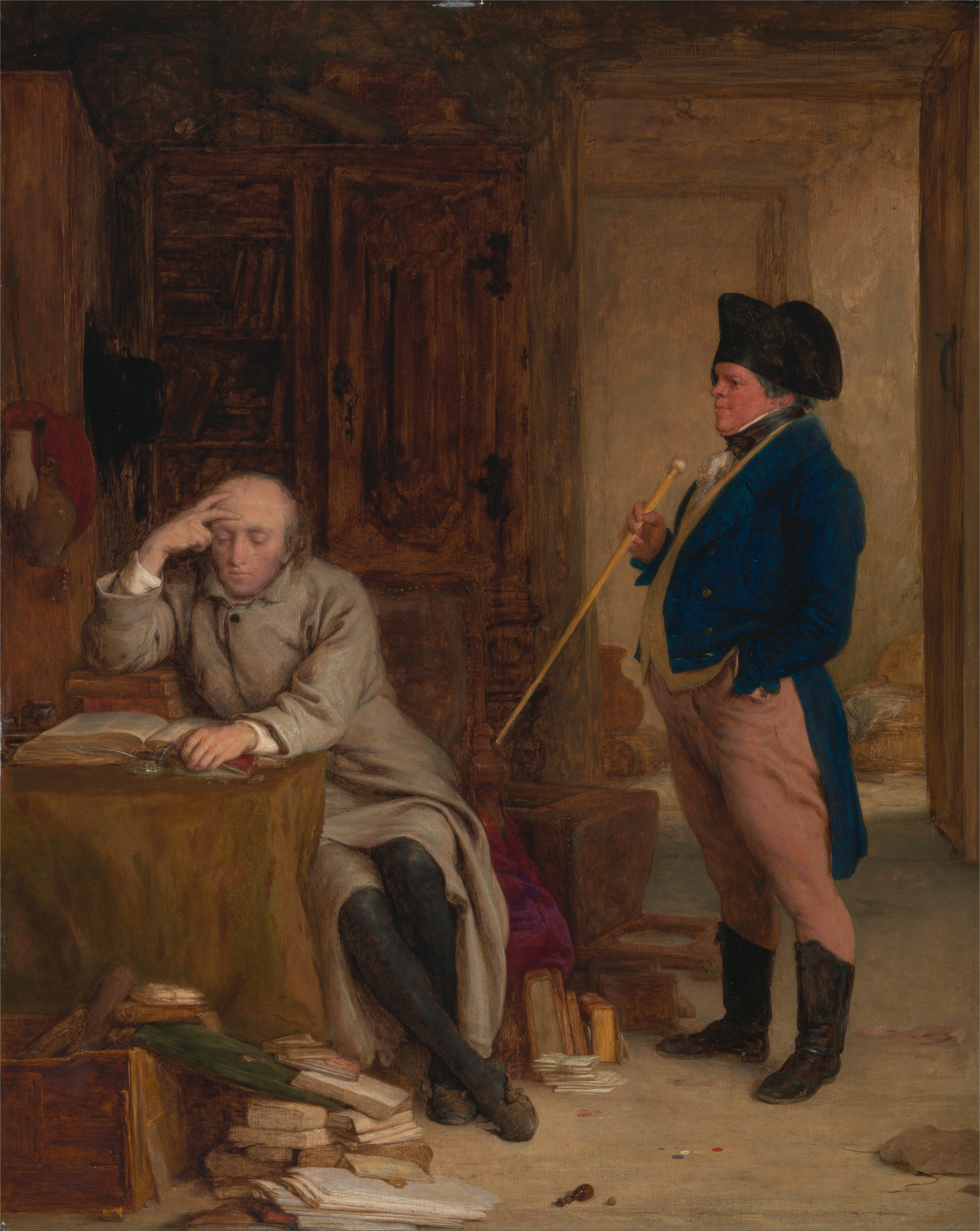
- Artist: William Mulready
- Year: 1831
- Type: Oil on panel, genre painting
- Dimensions: 51.4 cm × 41.9 cm (20.2 in × 16.5 in)
- Location: Yale Center for British Art, New Haven

Cargill and Touchwood is an oil on canvas genre painting by the Irish artist William Mulready, from 1831. It depicts a scene from the 1823 novel Saint Ronan's Well by Walter Scott. It is held at the Yale Center for British Art, in New Haven.

== Description ==
The painting depicts the meddlesome nabob Peregrine Touchwood barging in on the Reverend Josiah Cargill, the minister of the spa town of Saint Ronan's, in the Scottish Borders, while he is reading. The nabob seems very pompous in his elegant attire, holding a cane in his hand, while the reverend appears seated, apparently ignoring or paying little attention to him. He focuses instead on his book, with two of his fingers held to his forehead. Other books are lying on the floor, showing that this is a main interest of his. Despite their contrasting worldviews, the two men eventually form a bond over their shared interest in the Holy Land, which Touchwood has visited and Cargill has read a great deal about.

== Provenance ==
The painting was displayed at the Royal Academy's Summer Exhibition of 1832 at Somerset House in London. Today it is part of the collection of the Yale Center for British Art, in Connecticut, having been given by Paul Mellon.

== Bibliography ==
- Gordon, Katherine May. British Paintings of Subjects from the English Novel, 1740-1870. Garland, 1988.
- Rorimer, Anne. Drawings by William Mulready. Victoria and Albert Museum, 1972.
