= Christ Driving the Traders from the Temple (Turner) =

Painting by J. M. W. Turner

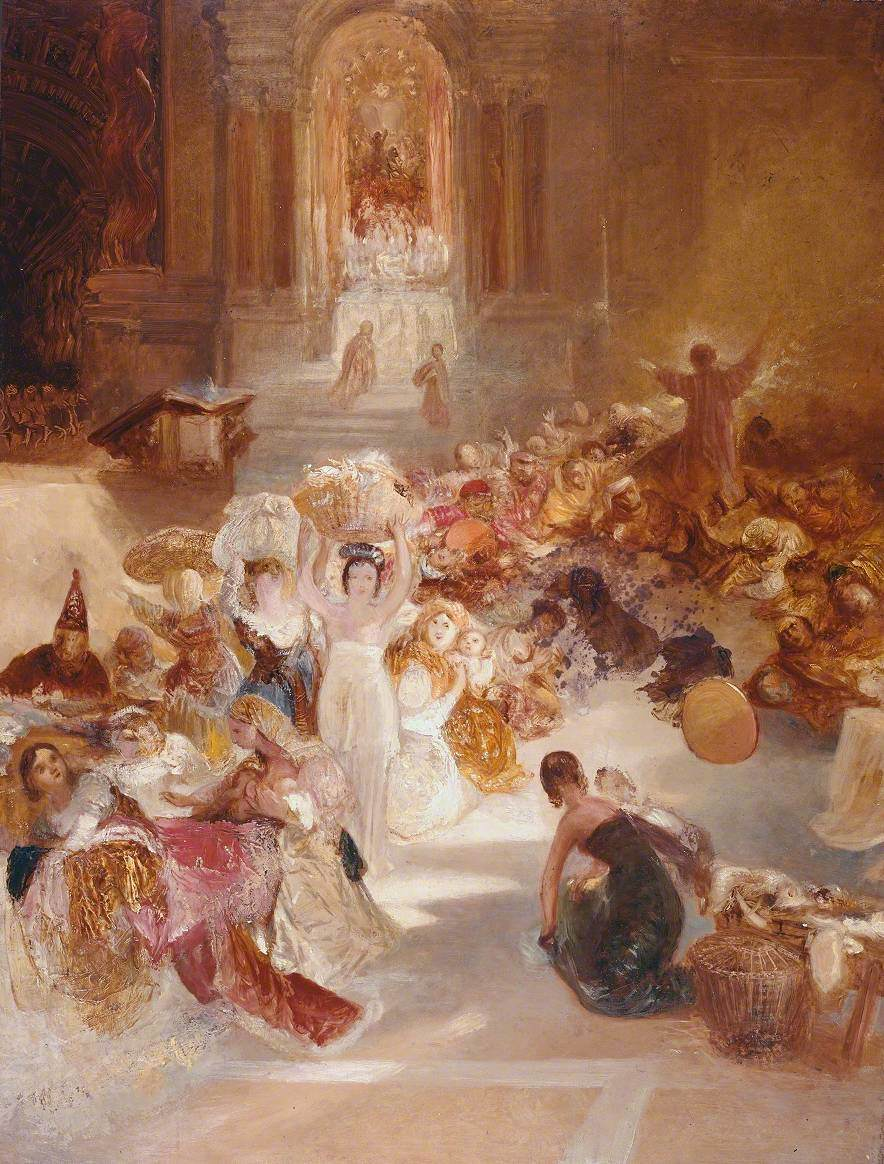
- Artist: J. M. W. Turner
- Year: 1832
- Type: Oil on mahogeny, history painting
- Dimensions: 92 cm × 70.5 cm (36 in × 27.8 in)
- Location: Tate Britain; London

Christ Driving the Traders from the Temple is an 1832 religious history painting by the British artist J.M.W. Turner. It depicts a scene from the biblical story of Jesus Christ expelling the merchants and moneylenders hawking for business in the Temple of Jerusalem. Turner drew heavily on the architecture of St. Peter's in Rome which he has first sketched on his 1819 visit to Italy.

It is likely the painting was produced as a companion piece to Turner's Shadrach, Meshech and Abednego, both drawn from the New Testament. While the later was submitted to the Royal Academy Exhibition of 1832 at Somerset House, this work although virtually complete remained unfinished and was not displayed. It has been suggested this was due to an accident to the painting that partly discoloured a portion of him, leading to Turner abandoning the work. It formed part of the Turner Bequest of 1856 and is today in the collection of the Tate Britain in London.

== See also ==
- List of paintings by J. M. W. Turner

== Bibliography ==
- Bailey, Anthony. J.M.W. Turner: Standing in the Sun. Tate Enterprises, 2013.
- Hamilton, James (ed.) Turner and Italy. National Galleries of Scotland, 2009.
- Sandy, Mark, O'Neill, Michael & Wootton, Sarah. Venice and the Cultural Imagination This Strange Dream Upon the Water. Taylor and Francis, 2015.
