= Phaedria and Cymochles =

Painting by William Etty

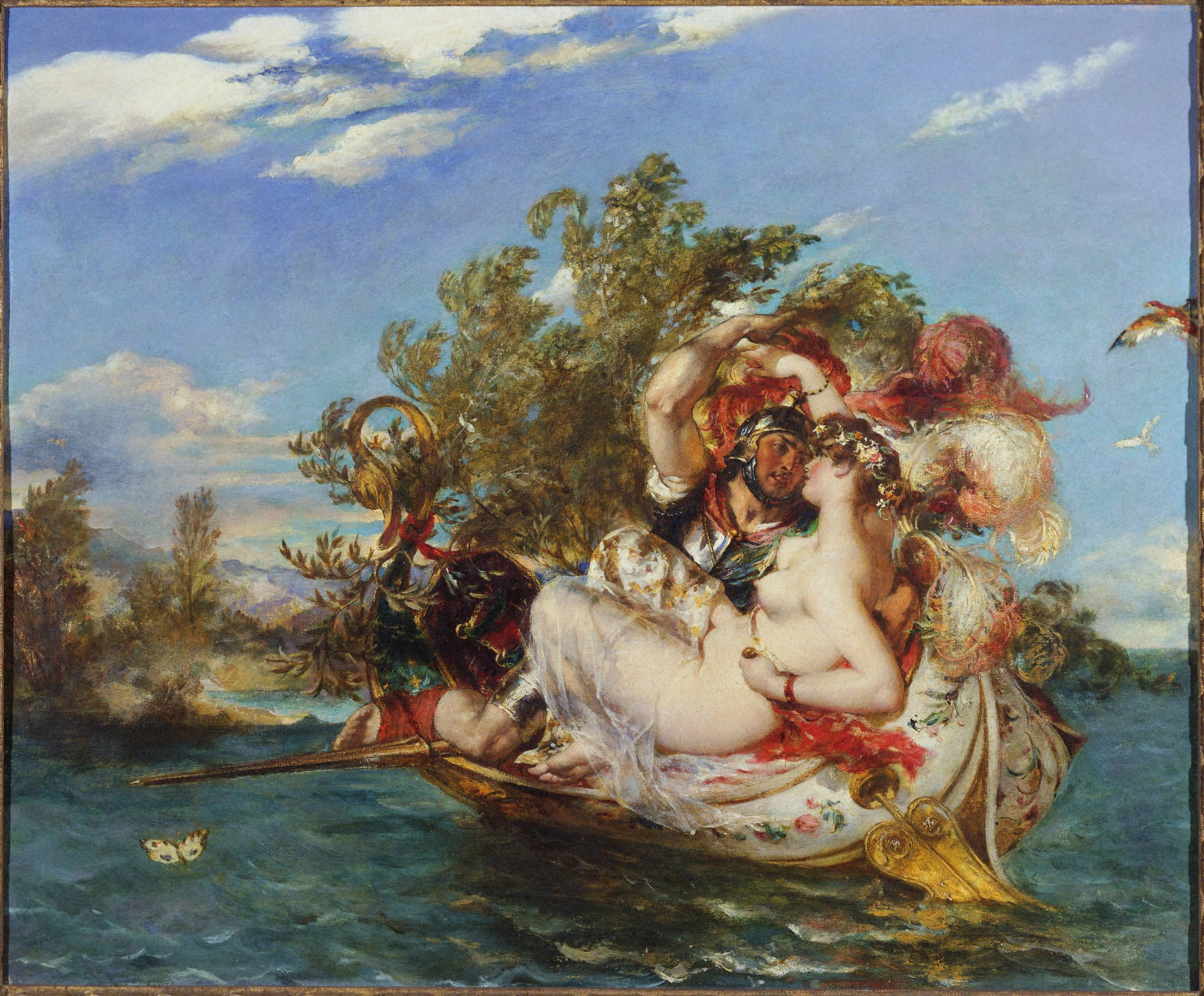
- Artist: William Etty
- Year: 1832
- Type: Oil on canvas, history painting
- Dimensions: 62.5 cm × 76 cm (24.6 in × 30 in)
- Location: Princeton University Art Museum, New Jersey

Phaedria and Cymochles is an 1832 oil painting by the British artist William Etty. It depicts a scene inspired by the epic poem The Faerie Queene by the Elizabethan writer Edmund Spenser. Cymochles, a moral knight on a quest, is lured onto a boat by the temptress Phaedria.

As with much of Etty's work it combines history painting with nude art.The painting was displayed at the Royal Academy Exhibition of 1832 at Somerset House in London, the smallest of the works he sent in that year. He submitted a later variation of the painting Phaedria and Cymochles on the Idle Lake to the Royal Academy Exhibition of 1835. The original is now owned by Princeton University Art Museum in New Jersey

== Bibliography ==
- Noon, Patrick & Bann, Stephen. Constable to Delacroix: British Art and the French Romantics. Tate, 2003.
- Robinson, Leonard. William Etty: The Life and Art. McFarland, 2007.
