= Hawking in the Olden Time =

Painting by Edwin Landseer

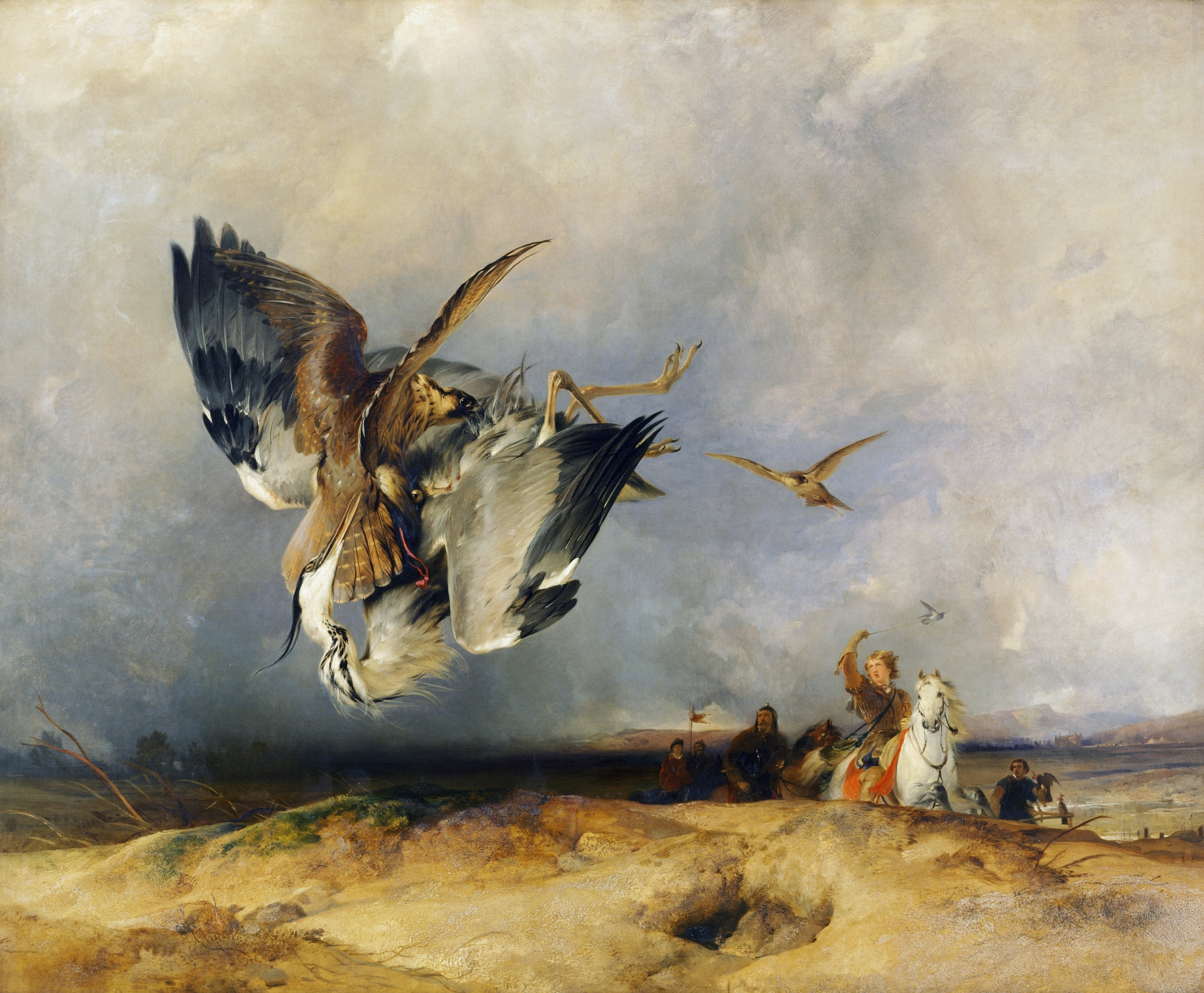
- Artist: Edwin Landseer
- Year: 1832
- Type: Oil on canvas, genre painting
- Dimensions: 153 cm × 184 cm (60 in × 72 in)
- Location: Kenwood House, London

Hawking in the Olden Time, or simply Hawking, is an 1832 genre painting by the British artist Edwin Landseer. It depicts a historic scene of hawking with the hawk and a heron dominating the composition, and the human figures moved into the background. The painting was the first of Landseer's major works to feature hawking, a theme he would return to. It was displayed at the Royal Academy Exhibition of 1832 at Somerset House in London, where it was praised by The Athenaeum as a "wonderful piece of painting, and boldly conceived". Today the painting is in the collection of Kenwood House in Highgate, having been acquired as part of the Iveagh Bequest in 1929.

== Bibliography ==
- Bryant, Julius. Kenwood, Paintings in the Iveagh Bequest. Yale University Press, 2003.
- Ormond, Richard. Sir Edwin Landseer. Philadelphia Museum of Art, 1981.
