= Childe Harold's Pilgrimage - Italy =

Painting by J. M. W. Turner

Childe Harold's Pilgrimage – Italy
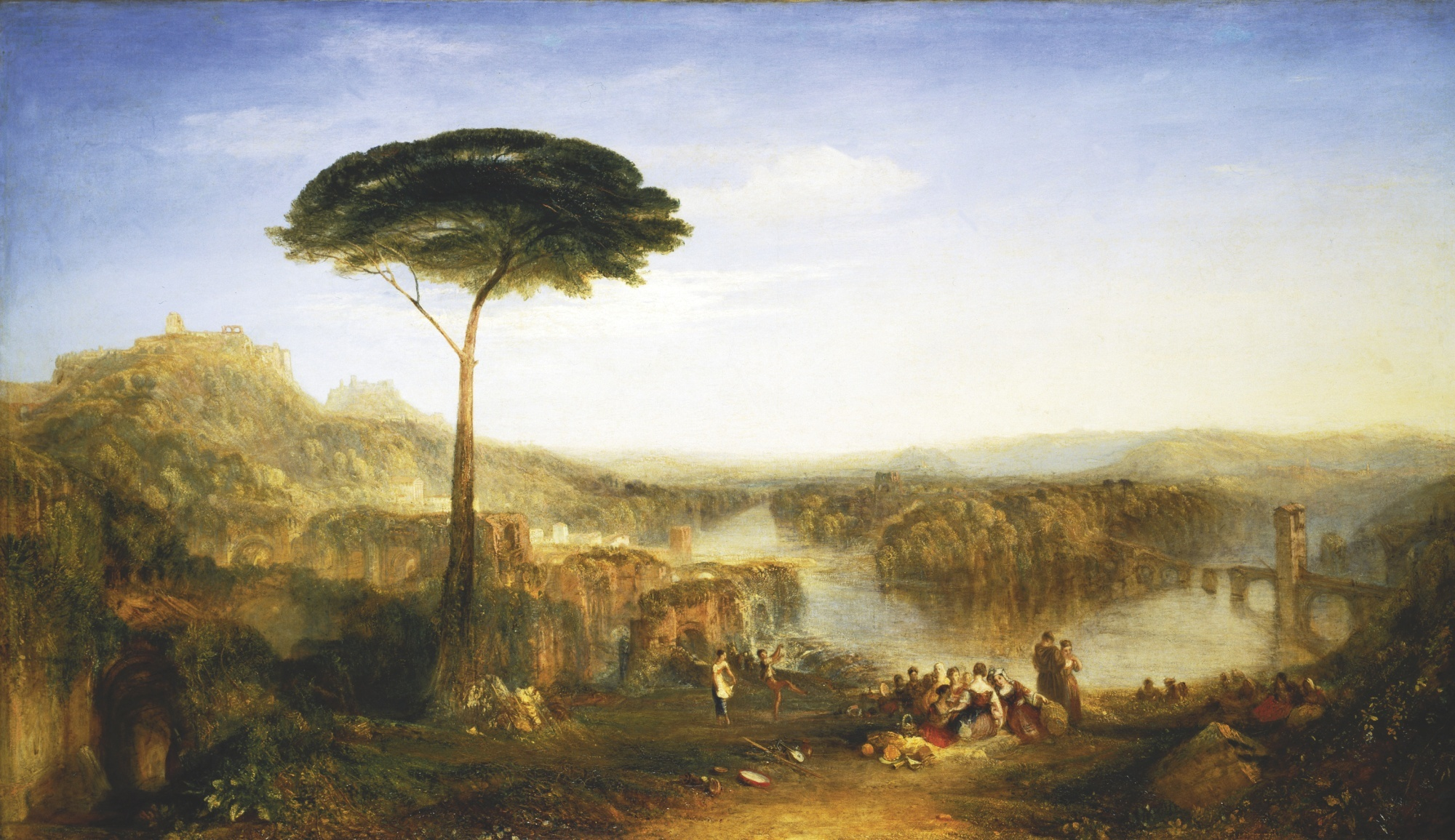
- Artist: J. M. W. Turner
- Year: 1832
- Medium: Oil on canvas, landscape painting
- Dimensions: 142.2 cm × 248.3 cm (56.0 in × 97.8 in)
- Location: Tate Britain, London
- Accession: N00516
- Website: tate.org.uk...n00516

Childe Harold's Pilgrimage – Italy is an 1832 landscape painting by the British artist J. M. W. Turner. It depicts a scene from the poem Childe Harold's Pilgrimage by Lord Byron. Turner possibly drew some inspiration from his friend Charles Lock Eastlake's 1827 painting Lord Byron's Dream. It also reflects the influence of the seventeenth century artist Claude Lorrain.

It was exhibited at the Royal Academy's Summer Exhibition of 1832 at Somerset House. It was extremely popular with visitors, but critics were unflattering about its use of colour. Is now part of the collection of Tate Britain, having been part of the Turner Bequest in 1856.

== See also ==
- List of paintings by J. M. W. Turner

== Bibliography ==
- Finley, Gerald (10 March 1999). Angel in the Sun. Montreal: MQUP. ISBN 978-0-7735-1747-9.
- Heffernan, James A. W. (2006). Cultivating Picturacy. Waco, Tex: Baylor University Press. ISBN 978-1-932792-41-6.
- Hamilton, James (1 January 1998). Turner - A Life. Sceptre. ISBN 978-0-340-62811-9.
- Pfister, Manfred (1996). The Fatal Gift of Beauty. Amsterdam: Rodopi. ISBN 978-90-5183-943-2.
