= The Preaching of John Knox Before the Lords of the Congregation =

Painting by David Wilkie

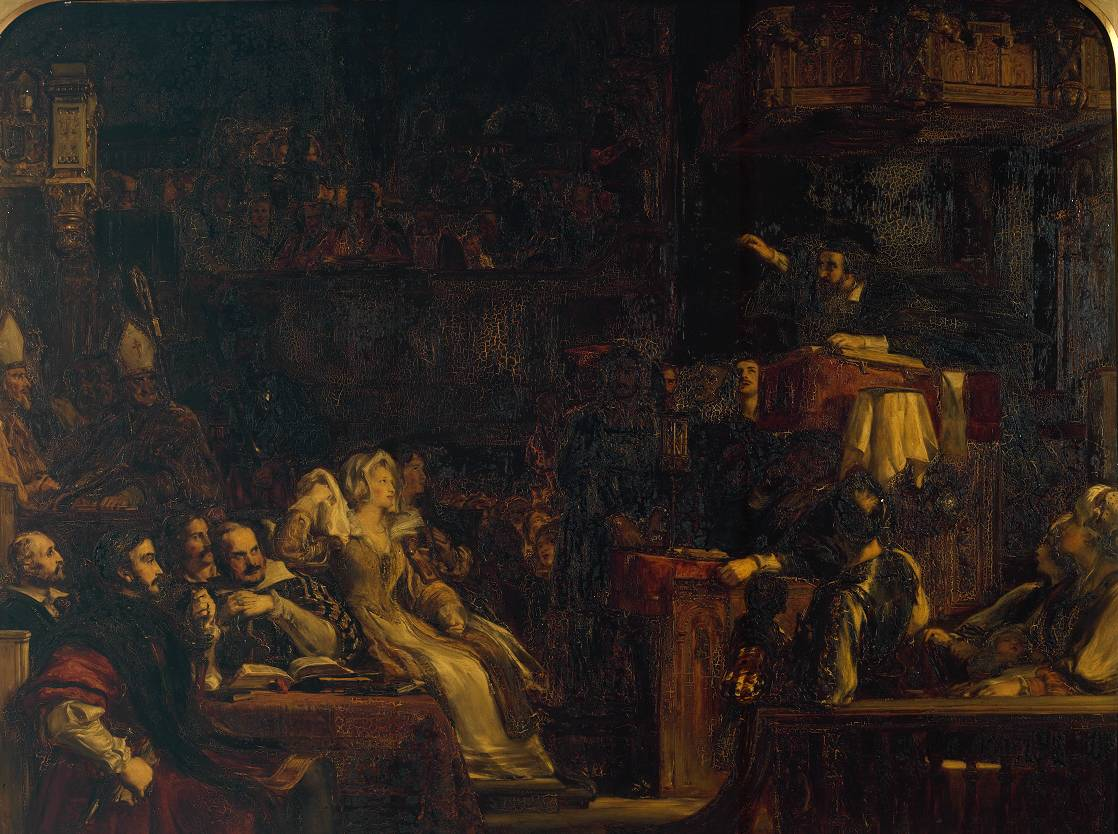
- Artist: David Wilkie
- Year: 1832
- Type: Oil on panel, history painting
- Dimensions: 165.1 cm × 122.6 cm (65.0 in × 48.3 in)
- Location: Tate Britain, London

The Preaching of John Knox Before the Lords of the Congregation is an 1832 history painting by the British artist David Wilkie. It depicts the sermon given by the Scottish minister John Knox in St. Andrews on 10 June 1559, a key moment in the Reformation in Scotland. Knox's inflammatory words before the Lords of the Congregation signalled the end of Roman Catholic governance in the nation. The painting draws a sharp contrast between the outraged reaction of the Catholic bishops and zealous focus of the Protestant Lords. Between them is the Countess of Argyll who had mixed sympathies due to her support for the Protestant reformers and her relationship with her half sister the Catholic Mary Queen of Scots.

Knox featured prominently in Walter Scott's novel The Monastery and its sequel The Abbot, both published in 1820. As early as 1821 Wilkie had produced a chalk drawing of Knox preaching. Although based on Thomas McCrie's Life of John Knox he still sought Scott's approval. He took an oil sketch to show both Scott and George IV during the royal visit to Scotland in 1822. While the king, who Wilkie hoped would commission a full painting based on it, was not impressed Scott admired the work. Although Wilkie, the son of a Scottish Presbyterian minister might have been expected to sympathise with Knox, his attitude to the subject was more ambivilent. Having lived in London as an Anglican for many years, he came to admire Roman Catholic the rituals during his travels in Continental Europe. This is reflected in the painting that focuses as much on the reaction of the listeners as on the fiery charisma of Knox himself. Despite extensive research in Scotland, Wilkie modelled Knox's manner on the contemporary preacher Edward Irving. The painting was produced for the politician and future Prime Minister Sir Robert Peel who was also a noted art collector.

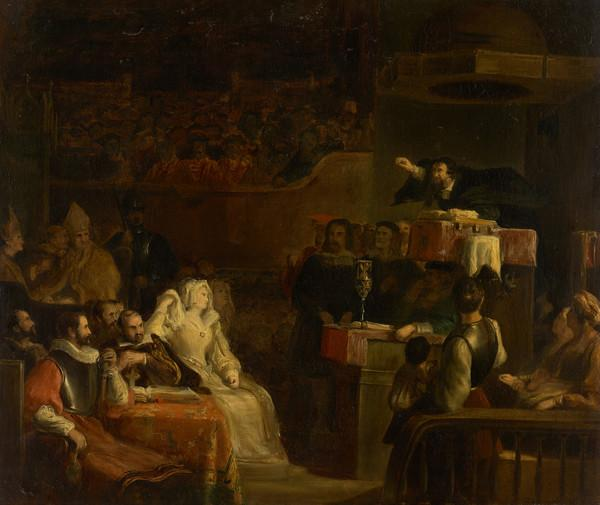
Version in the Scottish National Gallery

The painting was displayed at the Royal Academy Exhibition of 1832 at Somerset House in London. It was purchased by the National Gallery in 1871 and later transferred to the Tate. The oil sketch is in the collection of Petworth House in Sussex after being bought by the Earl of Egremont. A smaller version of the painting in the Scottish National Gallery, having been acquired in 1907.

== Bibliography ==
- Noon, Patrick & Bann, Stephen. Constable to Delacroix: British Art and the French Romantics. Tate, 2003.
- Tromans, Nicholas. David Wilkie: The People's Painter. Edinburgh University Press, 2007.
