= Rustic Civility =

Painting by William Collins

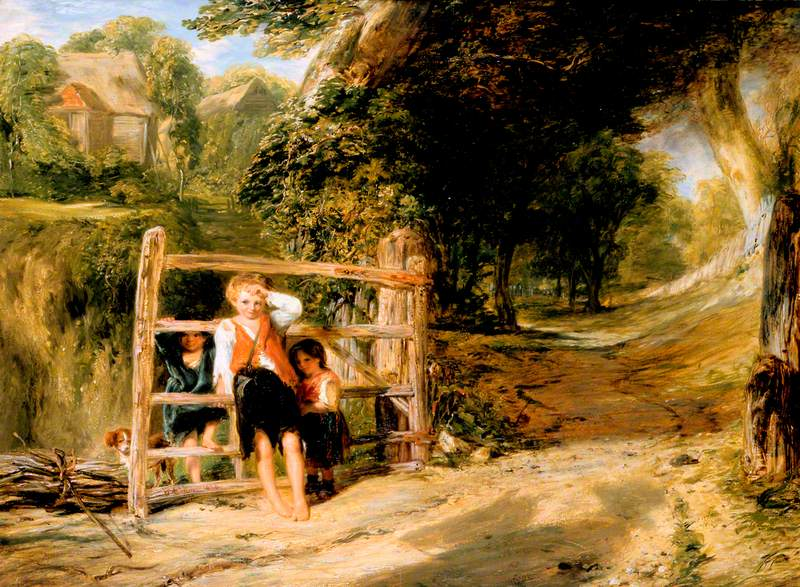
- Version in the Victoria and Albert Museum
- Artist: William Collins
- Year: 1832
- Type: Oil on panel, genre painting
- Dimensions: 45.6 cm × 61 cm (18.0 in × 24 in)
- Location: Victoria and Albert Museum; London

Rustic Civility is an oil on canvas genre painting by the British artist William Collins, from 1832.

== History and description ==
It depicts a scene in an English country lane, where a child holds open a gate for a passer-by on horseback. It has been suggested that the traveller, with only his shadow visible could be the local landowner, with the salute the boy is giving him adding a humorous touch to the scene.

One of the better known paintings of Collins, the father of the writer Wilkie Collins, it was displayed at the Royal Academy Exhibition of 1832 at Somerset House in London. It was acquired by the Duke of Devonshire for his Derbyshire country estate Chatsworth House. A smaller replica version was commissioned the following year by the art collector John Sheepshanks who donated it in 1857 to the Victoria and Albert Museum as part of the Sheepshanks Gift.

== Bibliography ==
- Barringer, T.J. Reading the Pre-Raphaelites. Yale University Press, 1999.
- Roe, Sonia. Oil Paintings in Public Ownership in the Victoria and Albert Museum. Public Catalogue Foundation, 2008.
- Wright, Christopher, Gordon, Catherine May & Smith, Mary Peskett. British and Irish Paintings in Public Collections: An Index of British and Irish Oil Paintings by Artists Born Before 1870 in Public and Institutional Collections in the United Kingdom and Ireland. Yale University Press, 2006.
