= Staffa, Fingal's Cave =

Painting by J. M. W. Turner

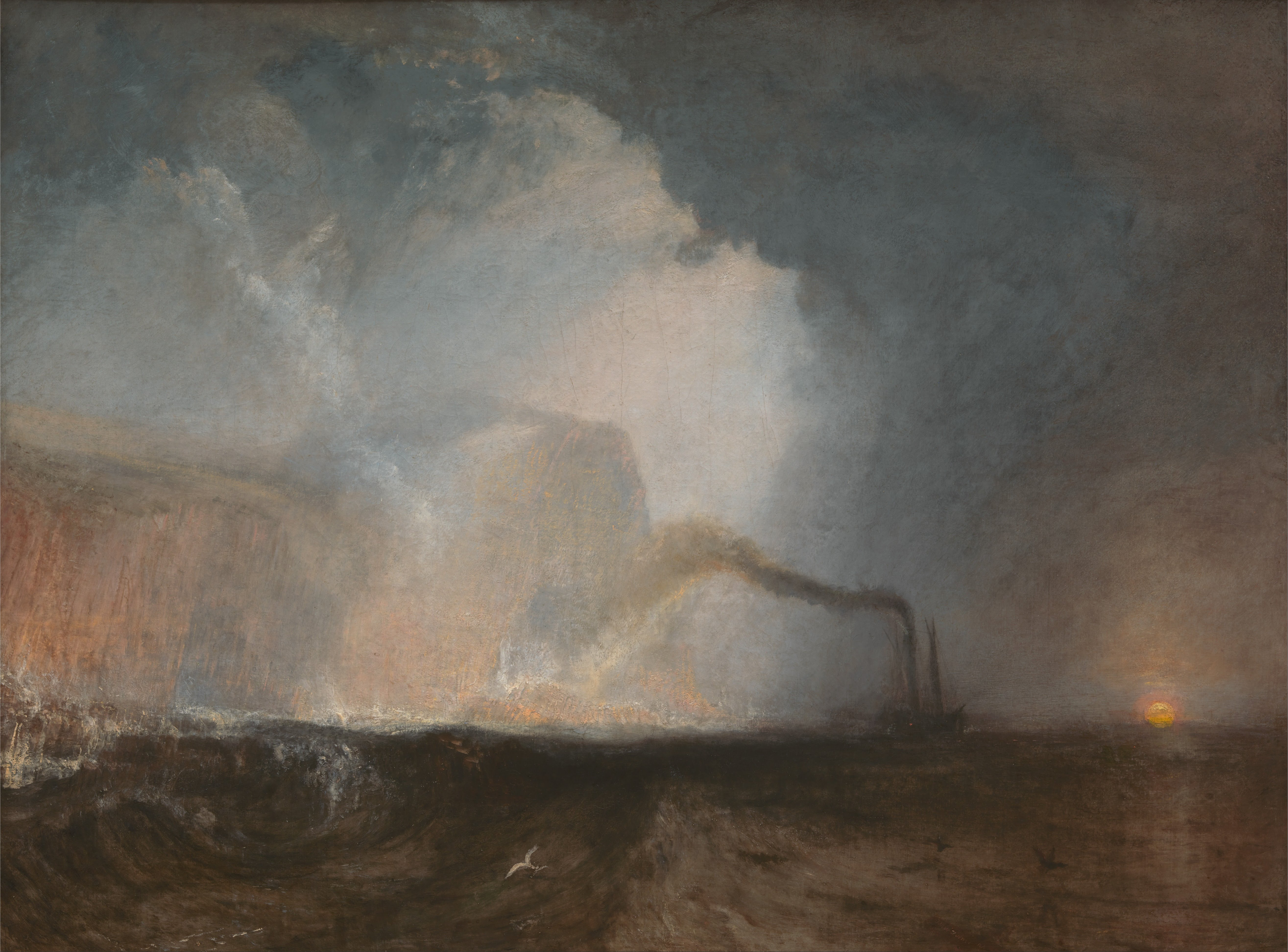
- Artist: J. M. W. Turner
- Year: 1832
- Type: Oil on canvas, landscape painting
- Dimensions: 99.8 cm × 121.3 cm (39.3 in × 47.8 in)
- Location: Yale Center for British Art, New Haven

Staffa, Fingal's Cave is an 1832 landscape painting by the British artist J.M.W. Turner. It features a view of Fingal's Cave on the Scottish island of Staffa in the Hebrides. Turner worked on the painting at his studio in Queen Anne Street in London following a visit to Scotland in 1831.

It was displayed at the Royal Academy's Summer Exhibition of 1832 at Somerset House. The painting is in the collection of the Yale Center for British Art in Connecticut, having been donated by Paul Mellon in 1978.

== See also ==
- List of paintings by J. M. W. Turner

== Bibliography ==
- Bailey, Anthony. J.M.W. Turner: Standing in the Sun. Tate Enterprises, 2013.
- Hamilton, James. Turner - A Life. Sceptre, 1998.
- Mitchell, Sebastian. Visions of Britain, 1730-1830: Anglo-Scottish Writing and Representation. Springer, 2013.
