= Royal Academy Exhibition of 1832 =

1832 art exhibition in London

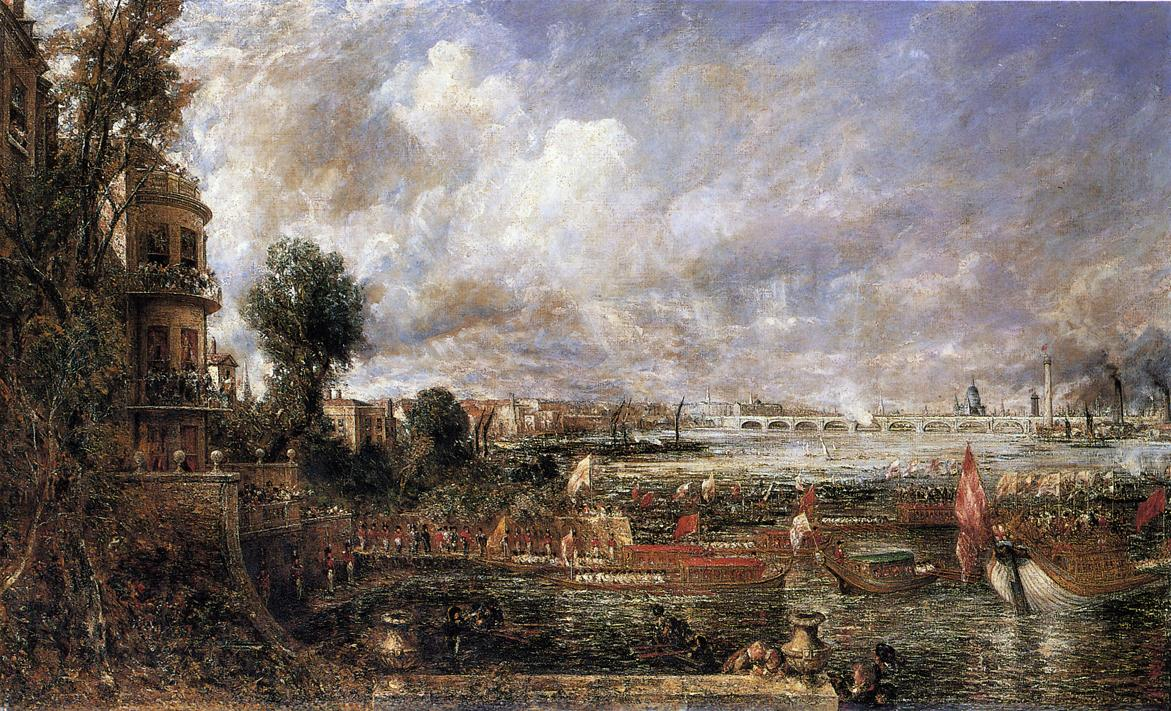
The Opening of Waterloo Bridge by John Constable

The Royal Academy Exhibition of 1832 was the annual Summer Exhibition of the Royal Academy of Arts in London. It took place at Somerset House between 7 May and 21 July 1832. As with the previous year's exhibition, it was notable for the rivalry between the painters John Constable and William Turner. In a celebrated incident Constable claimed that Turner had "fired a gun" due to a last minute alteration to one of his paintings, in a likely attempt to upstage a Constable work hanging nearby.

During varnishing day when the paintings were being readied for exhibition Turner suddenly added a splash of red paint to his seascape Helvoetsluys which hung next to The Opening of Waterloo Bridge, a painting that John Constable had been working on for a more than a decade. Constable response by crying out "He has been here and fired a gun". The incident was recorded by fellow artist Charles Robert Leslie. Despite the ensuing controversy, exactly what Constable meant by the remark remains debatable.

Turner displayed five other works including Childe Harold's Pilgrimage and Staffa, Fingal's Cave. David Wilkie exhibited his history painting The Preaching of John Knox Before the Lords of the Congregation, commissioned by the future Prime Minister Robert Peel.

Attendances were down that year, possibly owing to recent public unrest over the Great Reform Bill and a cholera outbreak in the capital. The exhibition and the exchange between Constable and Turner features in the 2014 film Mr. Turner by Mike Leigh. It was followed by the Royal Academy Exhibition of 1833 at the same venue.

== Gallery ==
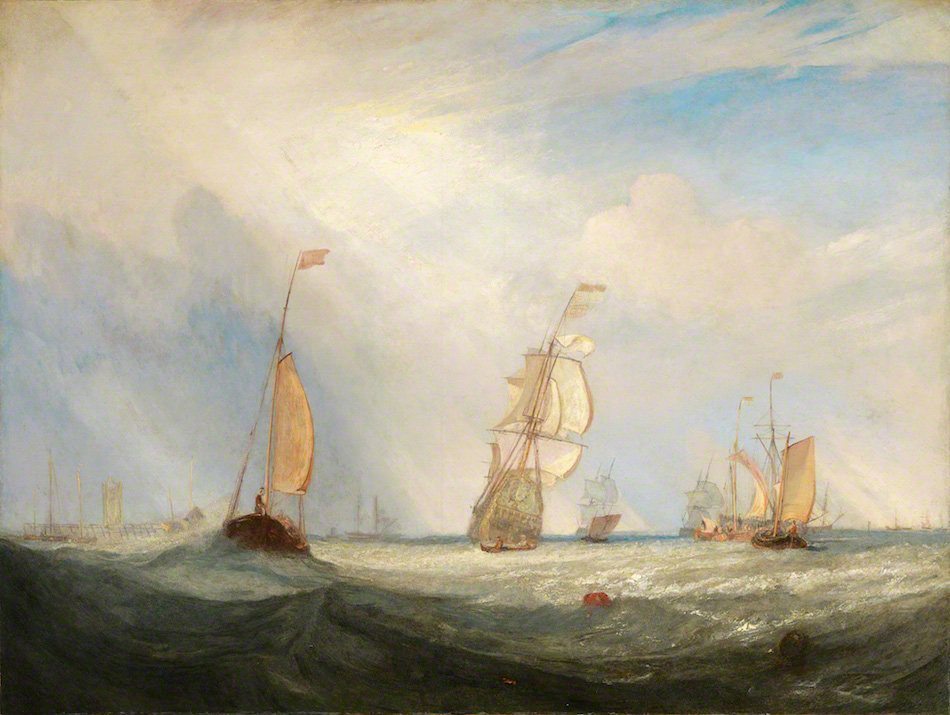
Helvoetsluys by J.M.W. Turner

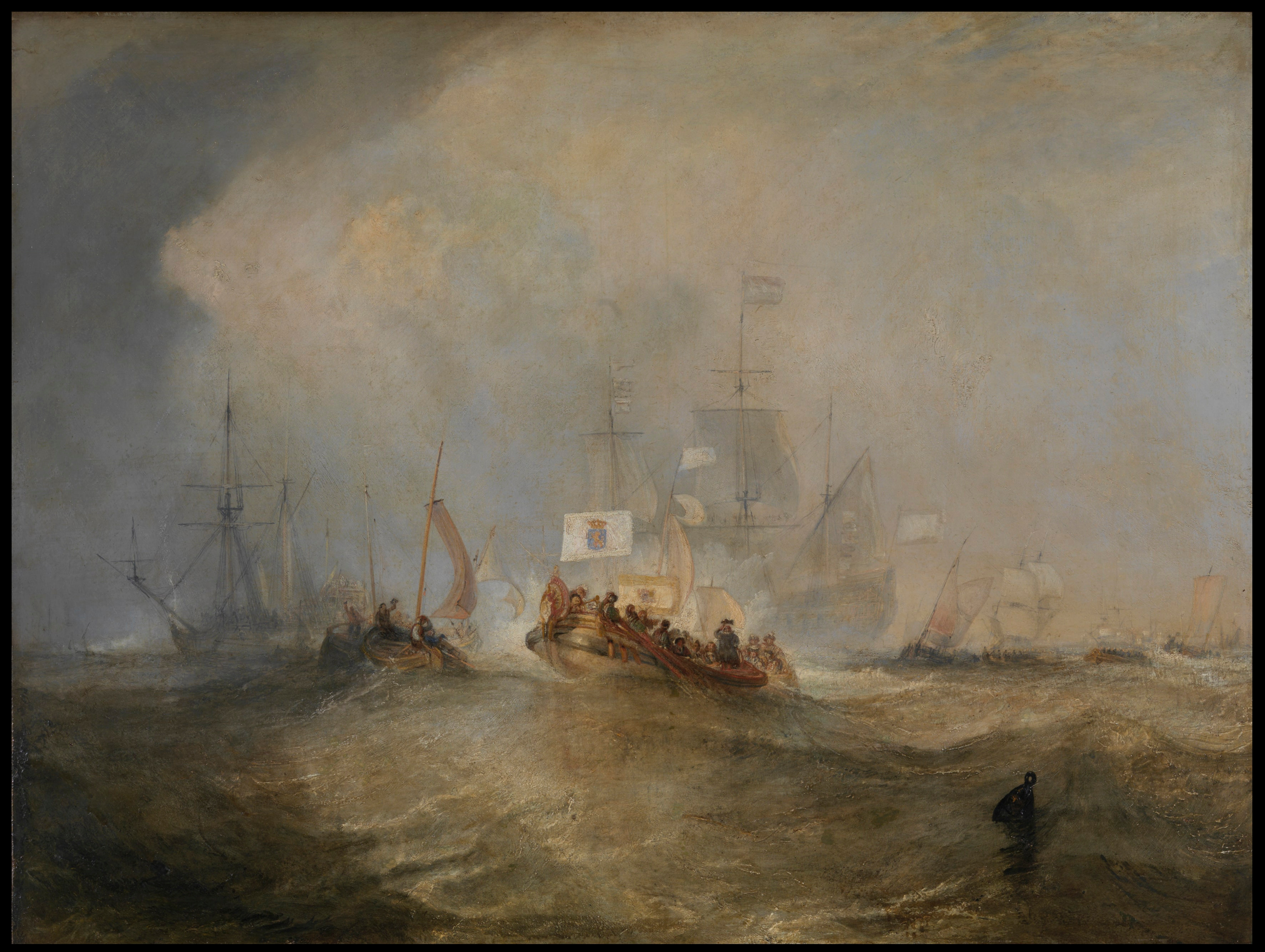
The Prince of Orange Landing at Torbay by J.M.W. Turner

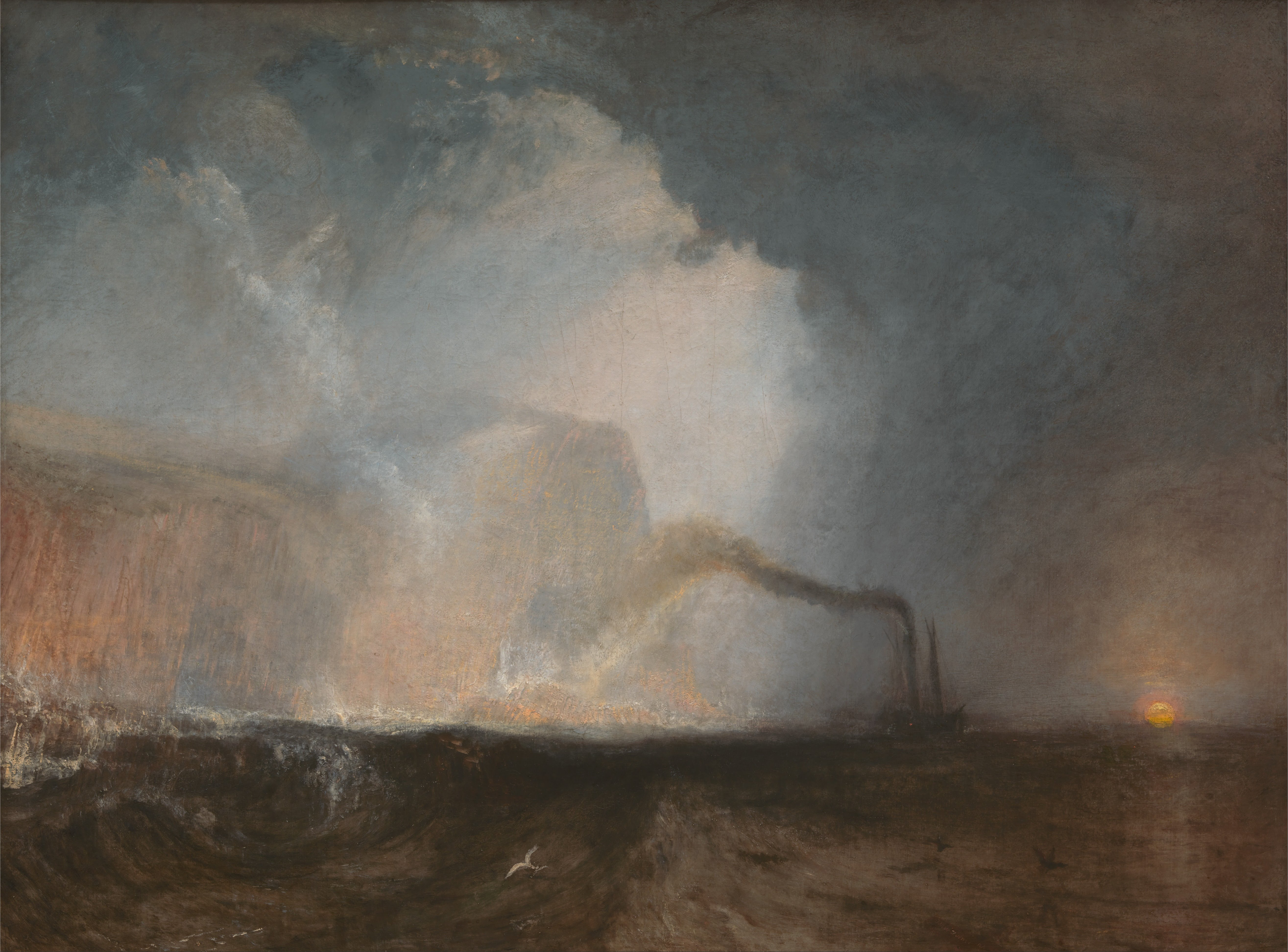
Staffa, Fingal's Cave by J.M.W. Turner

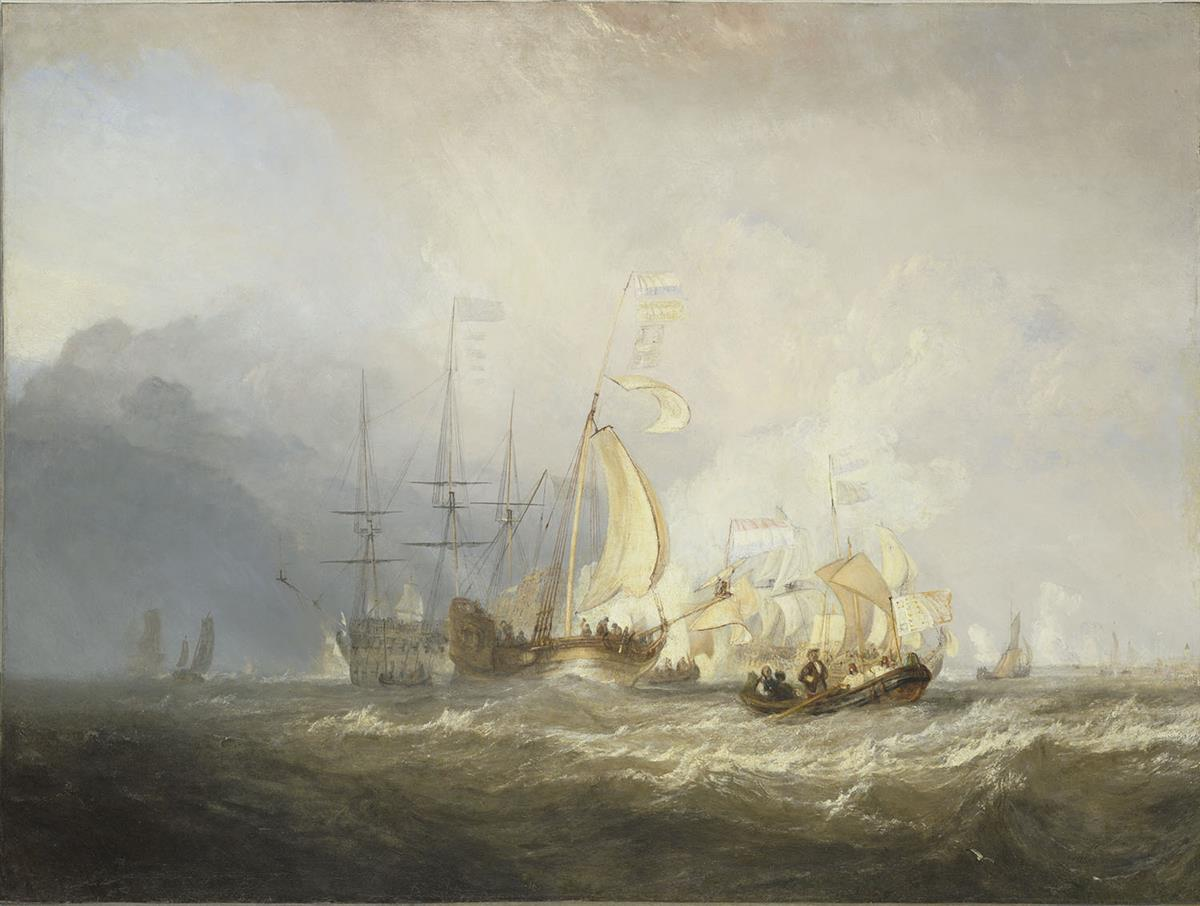
Van Tromp's Shallop at the Entrance of the Scheldt by J.M.W. Turner

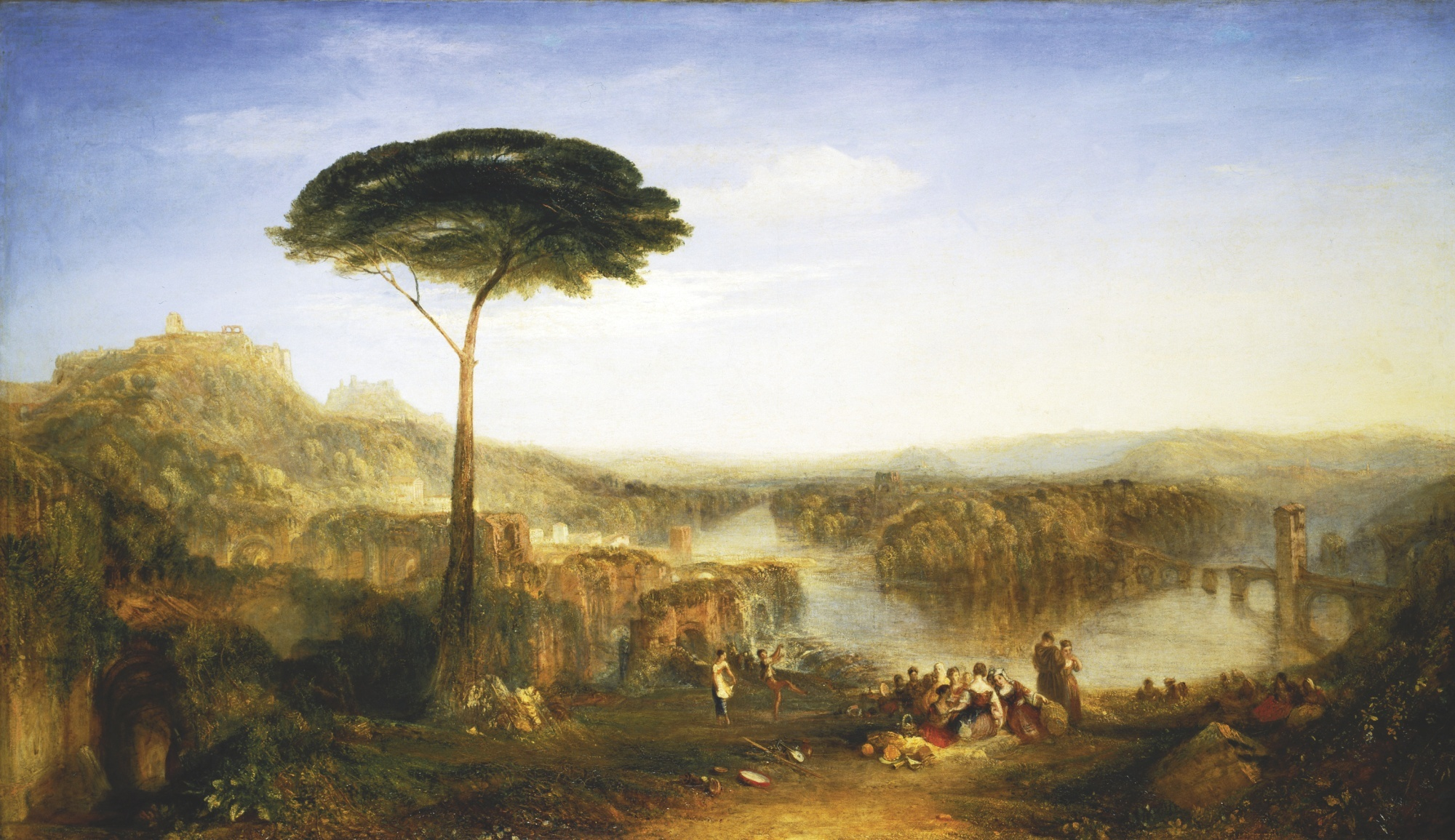
Childe Harold's Pilgrimage by J.M.W. Turner

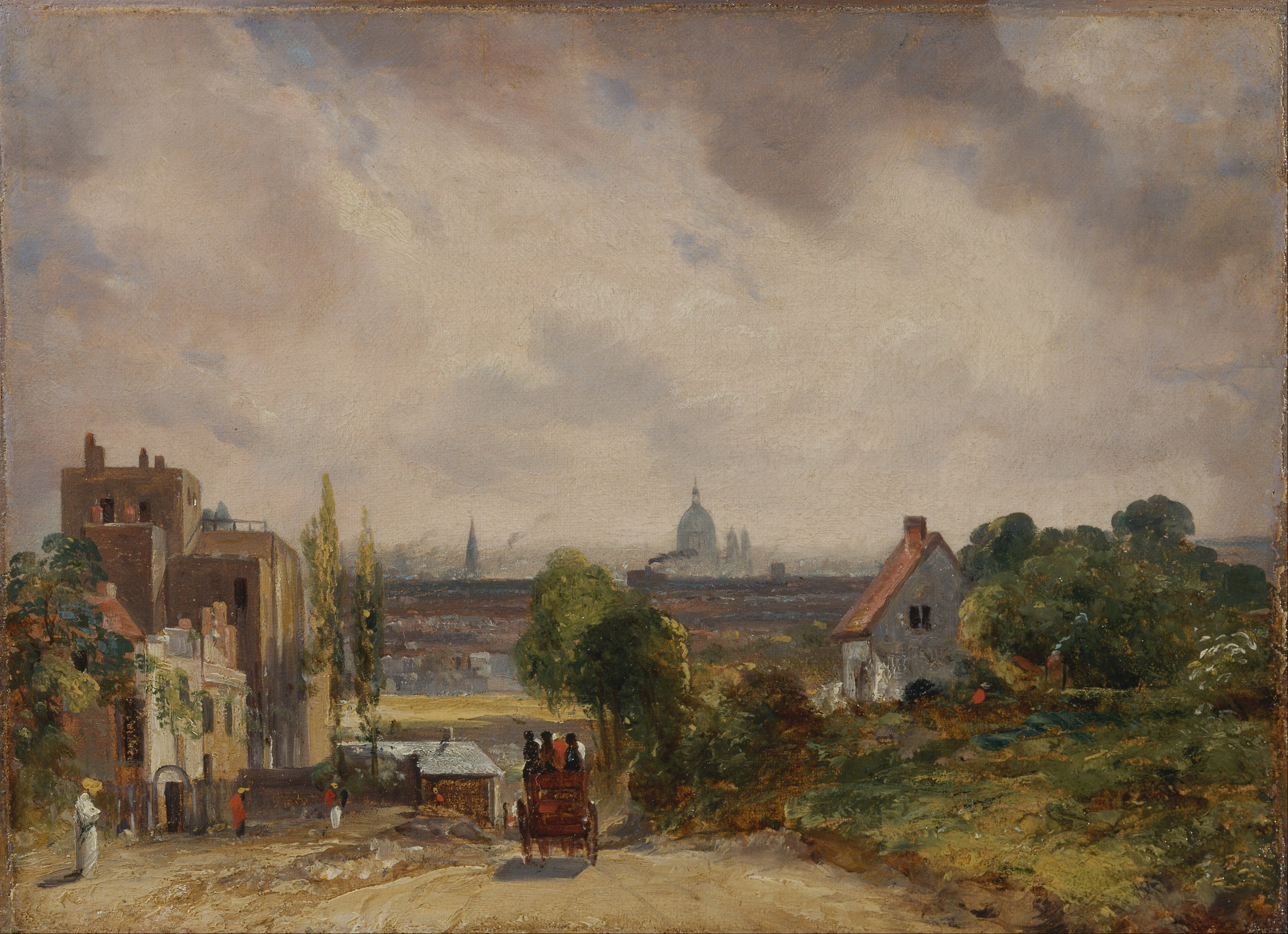
Sir Richard Steele's Cottage, Hampstead by John Constable

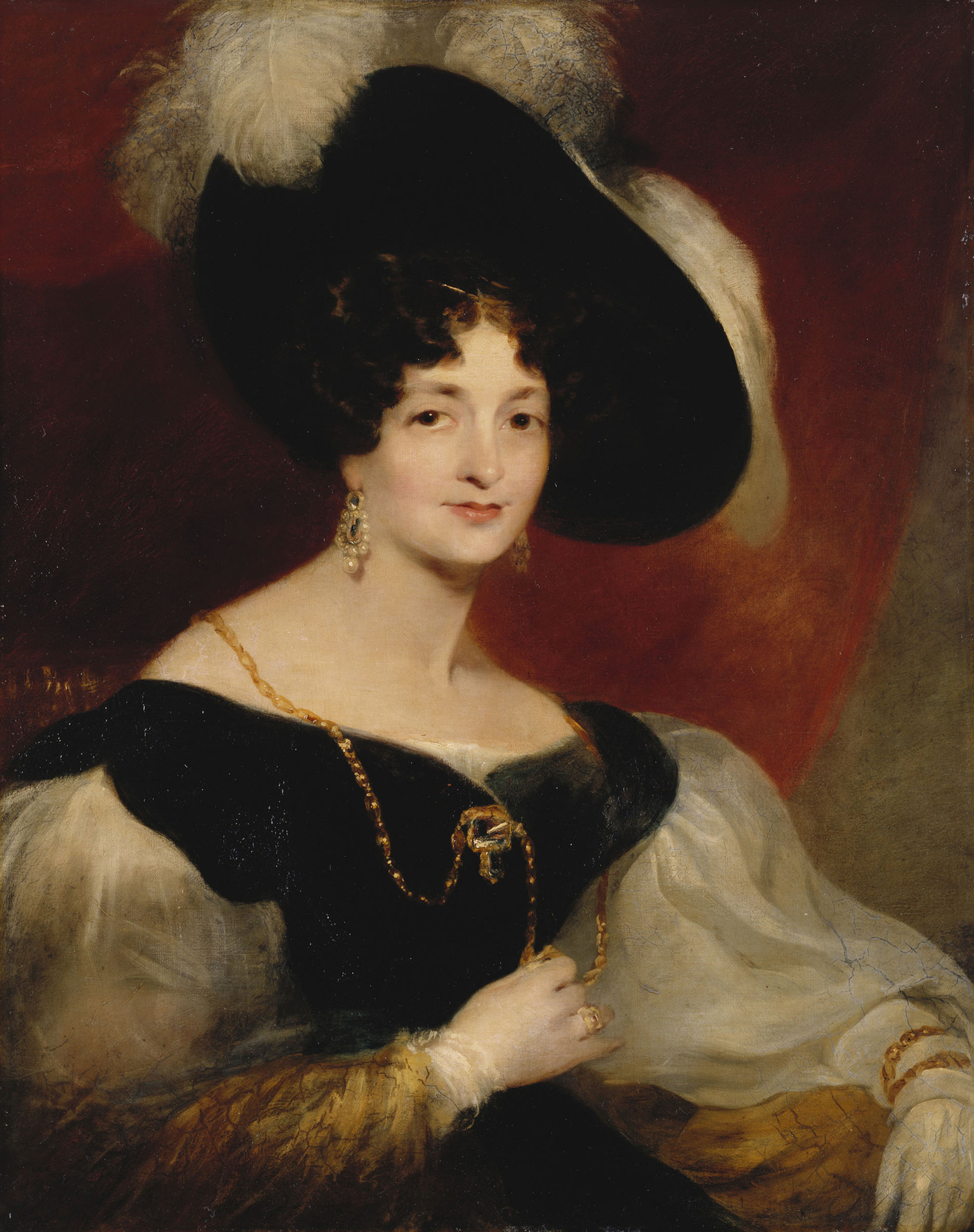
Portrait of the Duchess of Kent by Richard Rothwell

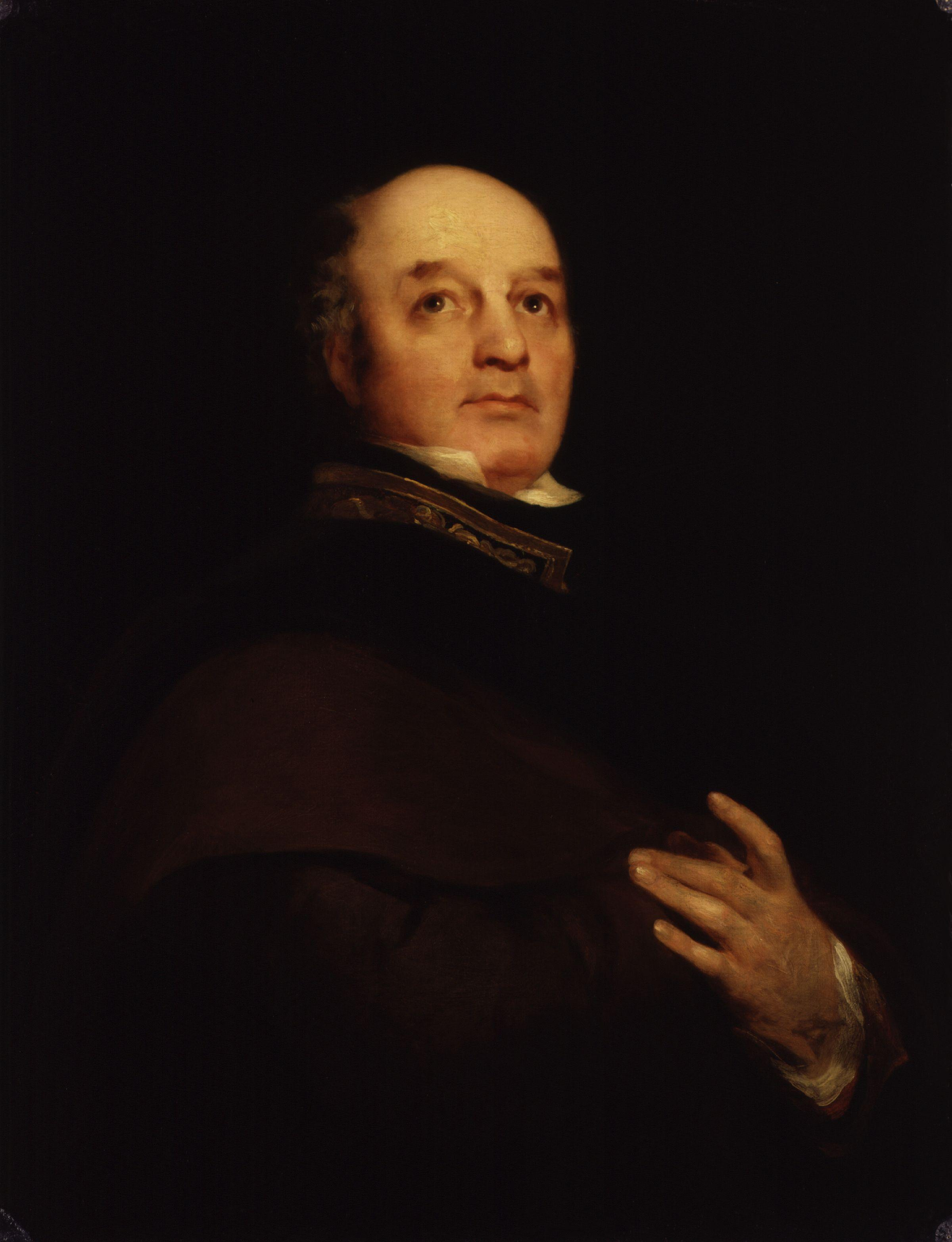
Portrait of Lord Beresford by Richard Rothwell

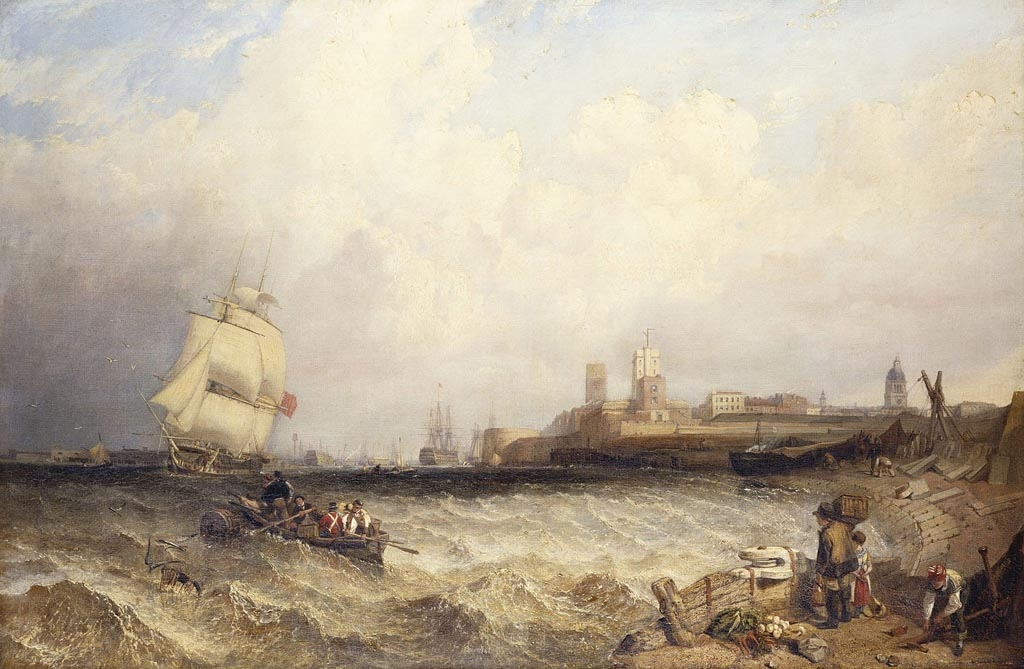
Portsmouth Harbour by Clarkson Stanfield

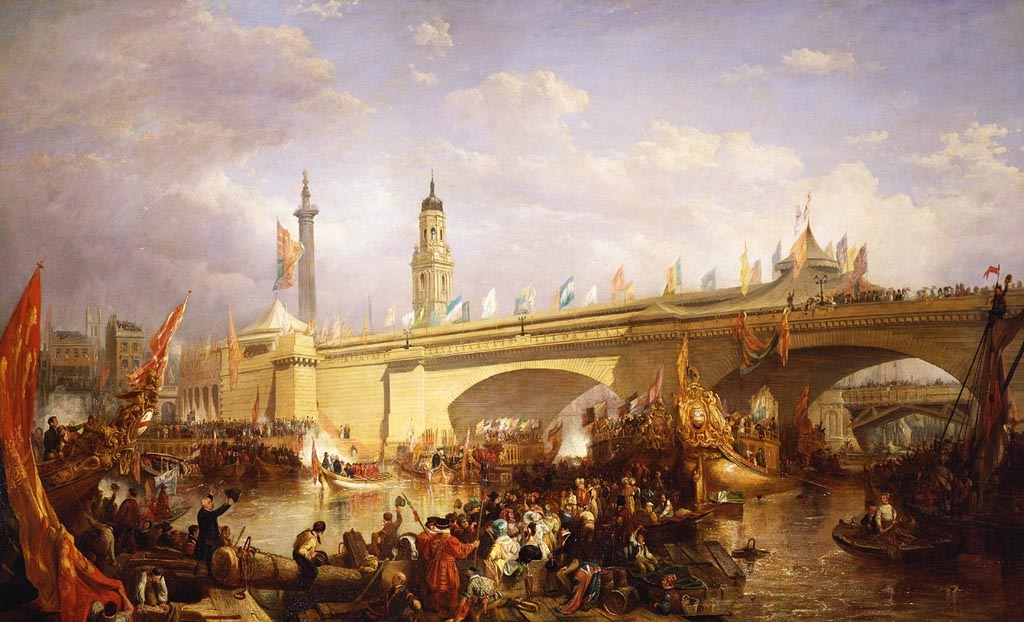
The Opening of New London Bridge by Clarkson Stanfield

The Royal Procession at the Opening of the New London Bridge by George Jones

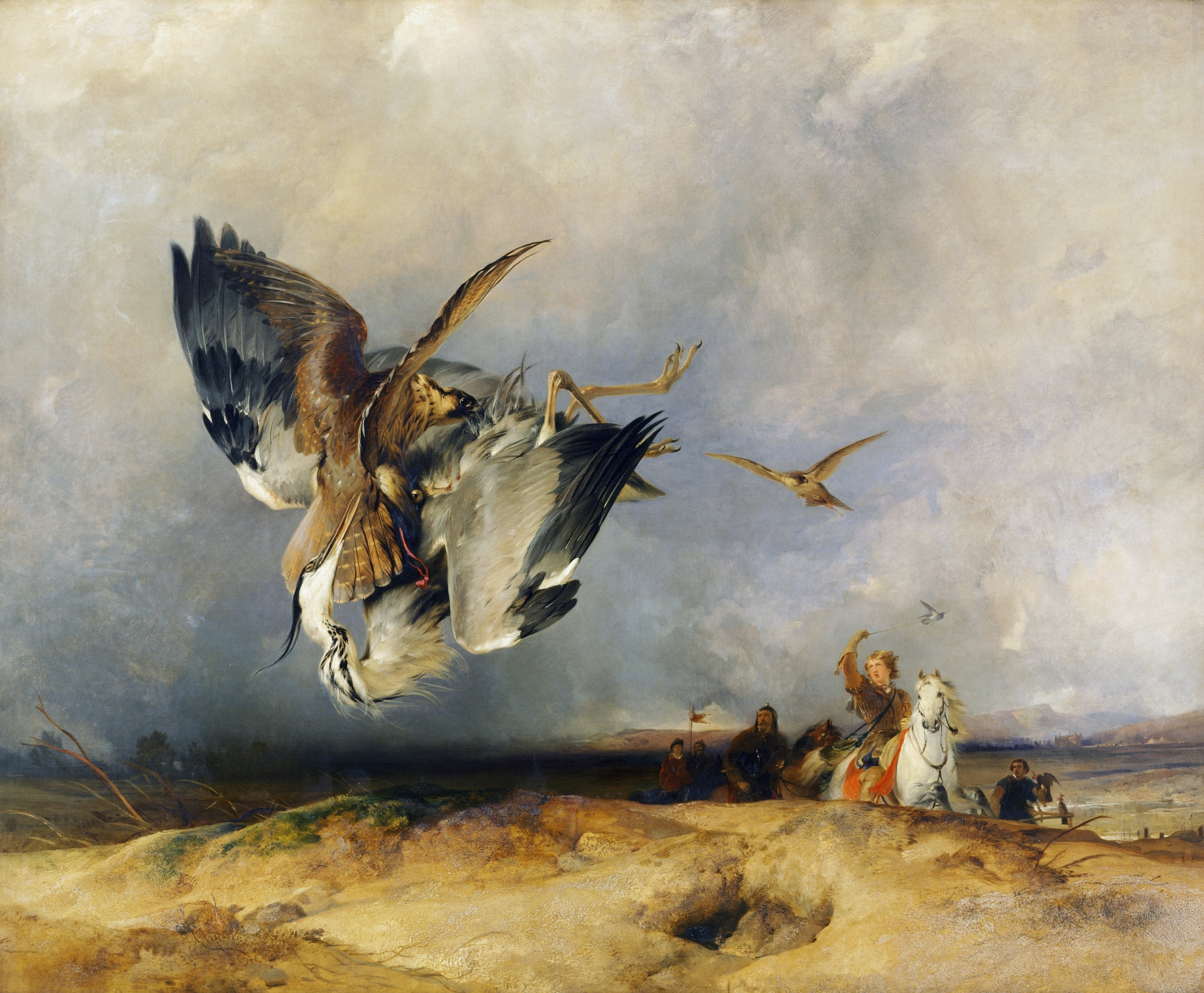
Hawking in the Olden Time by Edwin Landseer

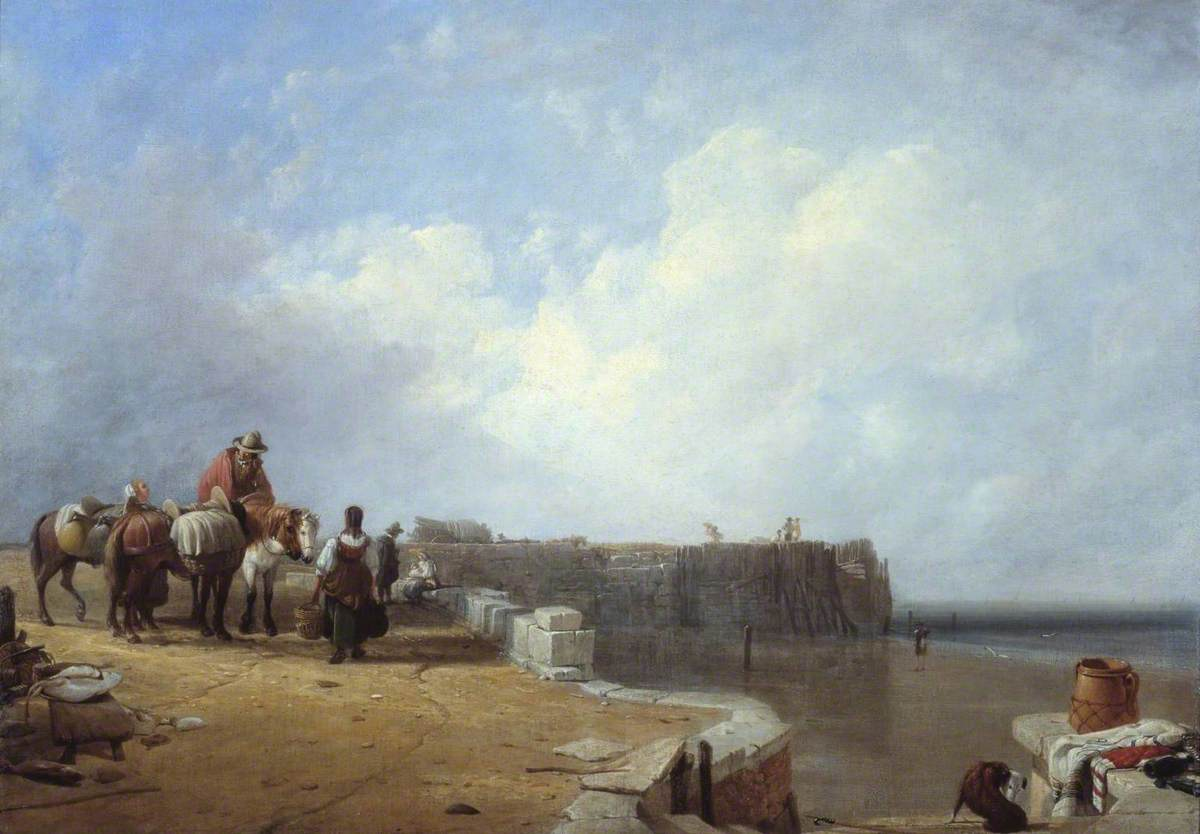
Dutch Coast Scene by Augustus Wall Callcott

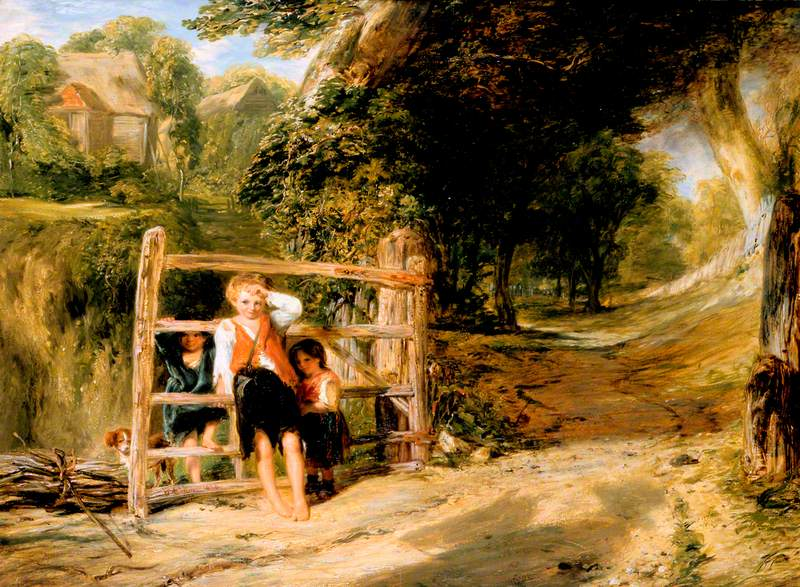
Rustic Civility by William Collins

Skittle Players by William Collins

The Fair Maid of Perth by William Allan

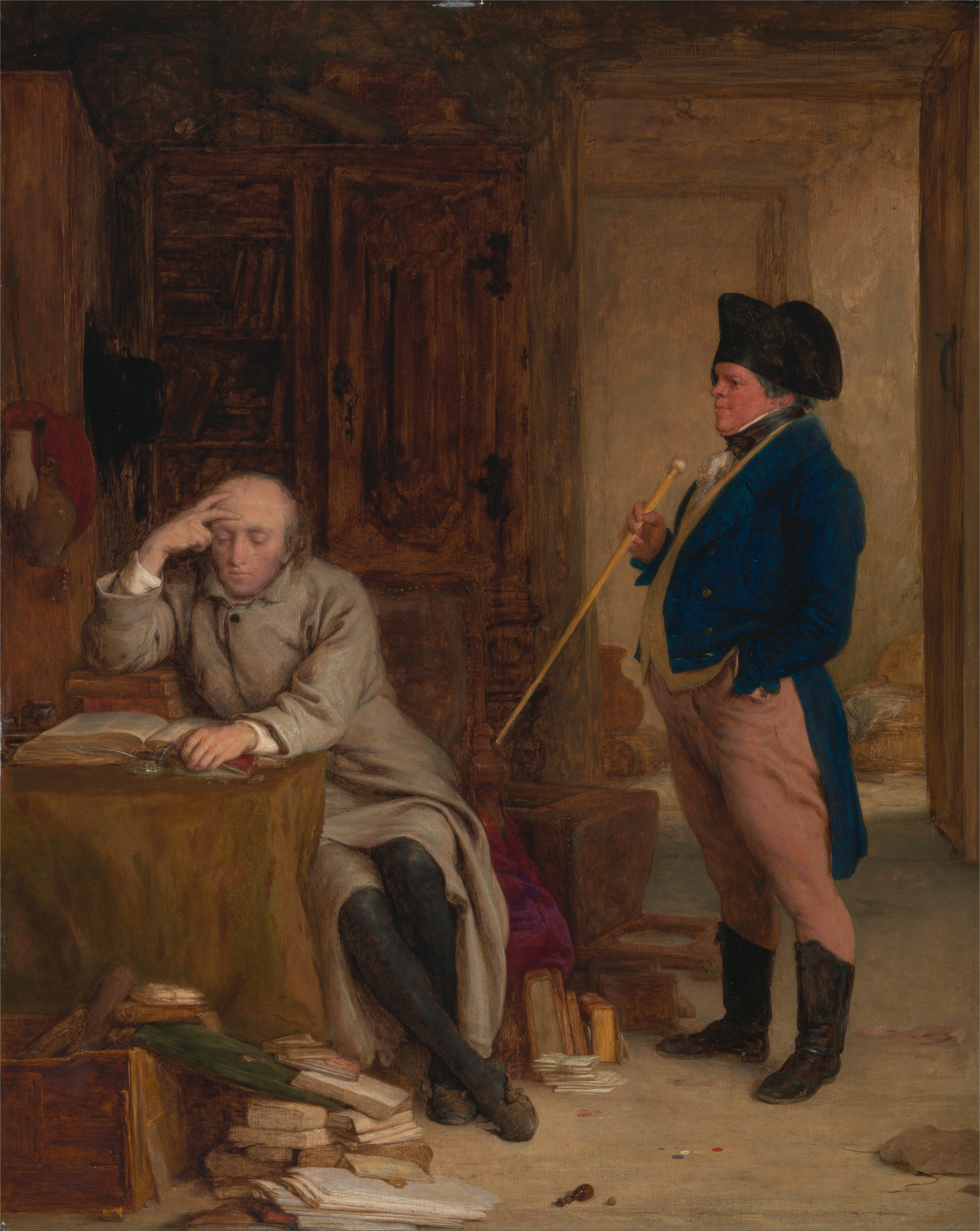
Cargill and Touchwood by William Mulready

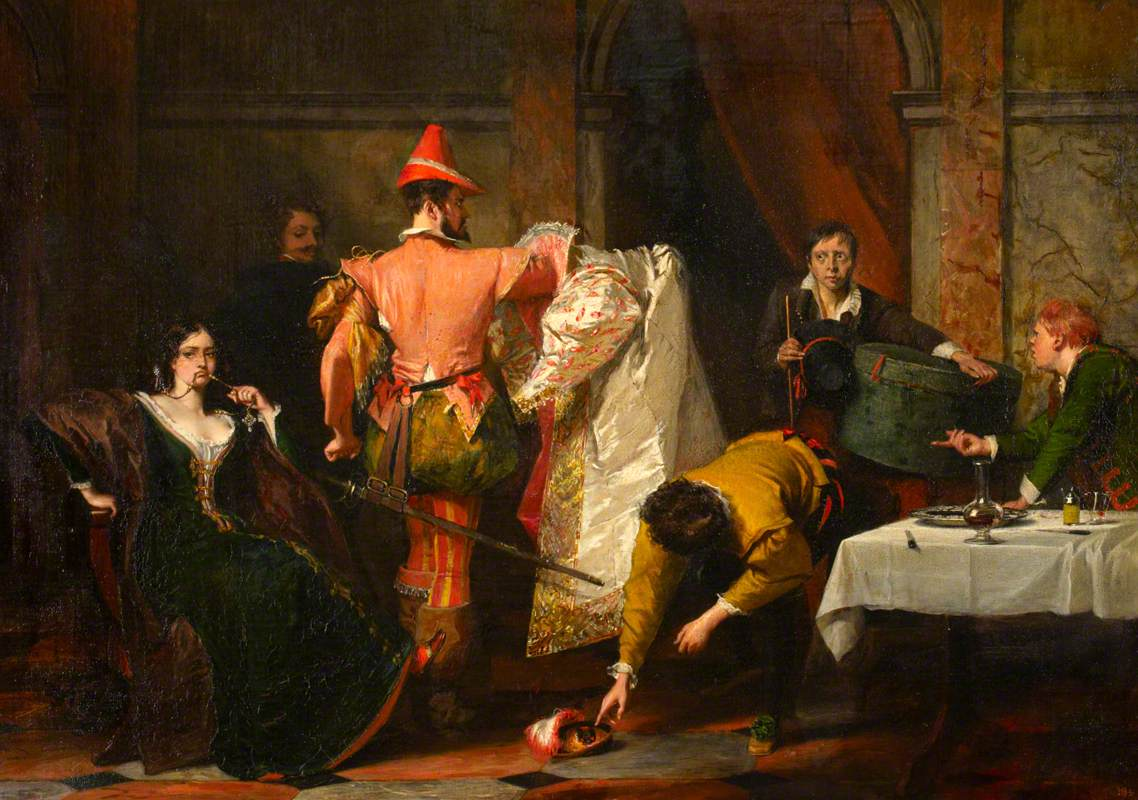
The Taming of the Shrew by Charles Robert Leslie

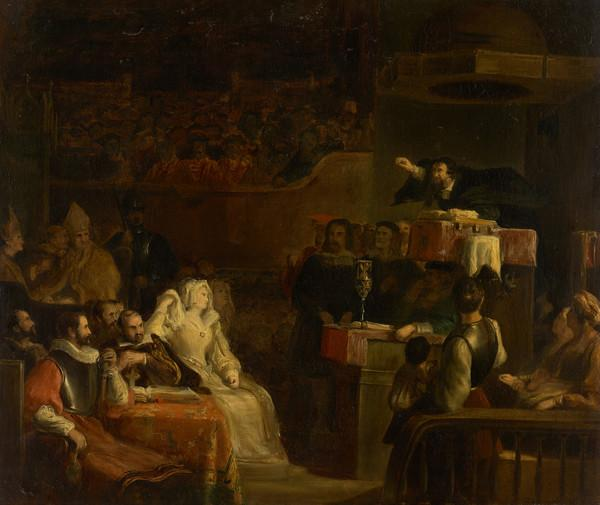
The Preaching of John Knox Before the Lords of the Congregation by David Wilkie

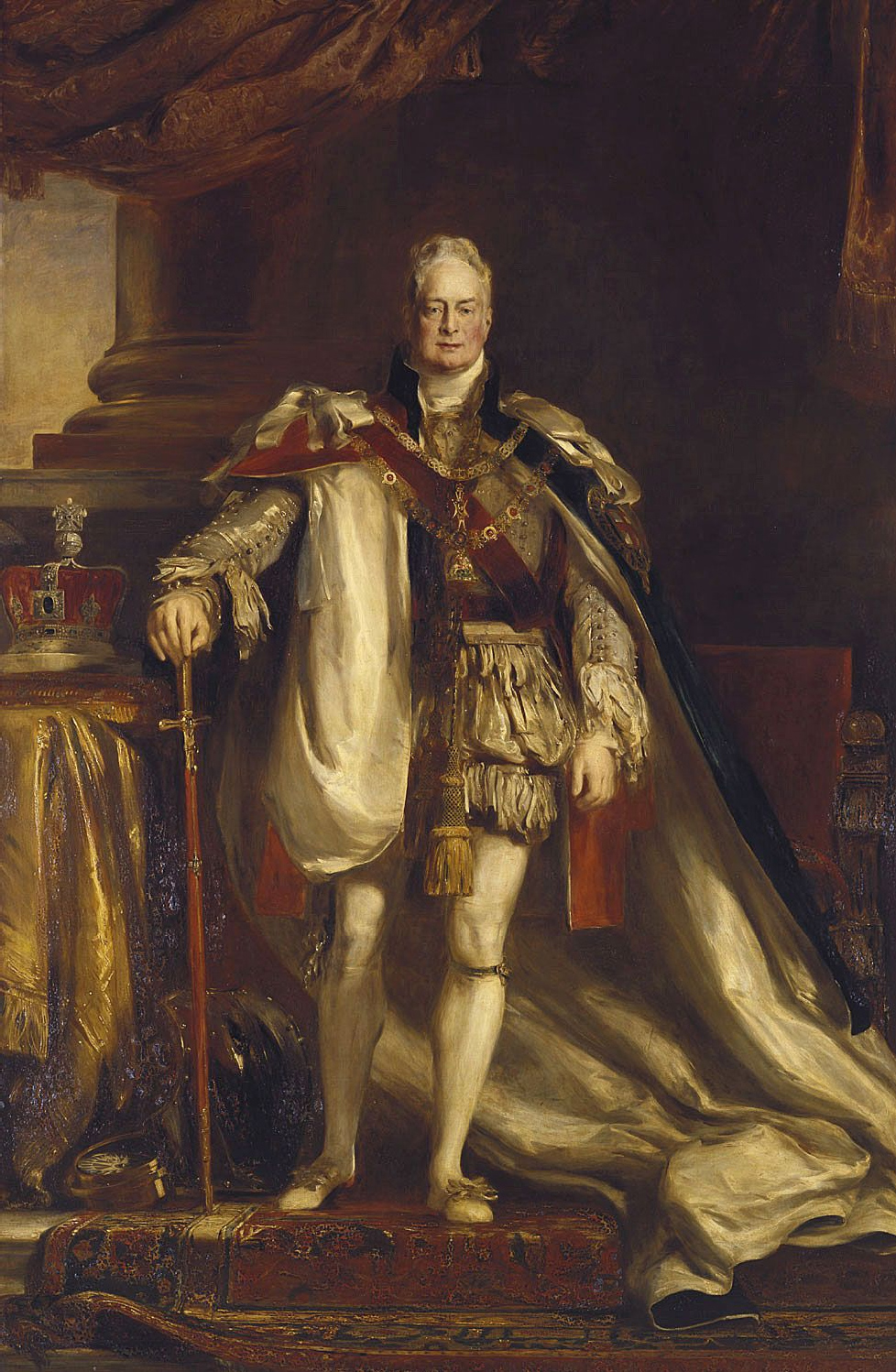
Portrait of William IV by David Wilkie

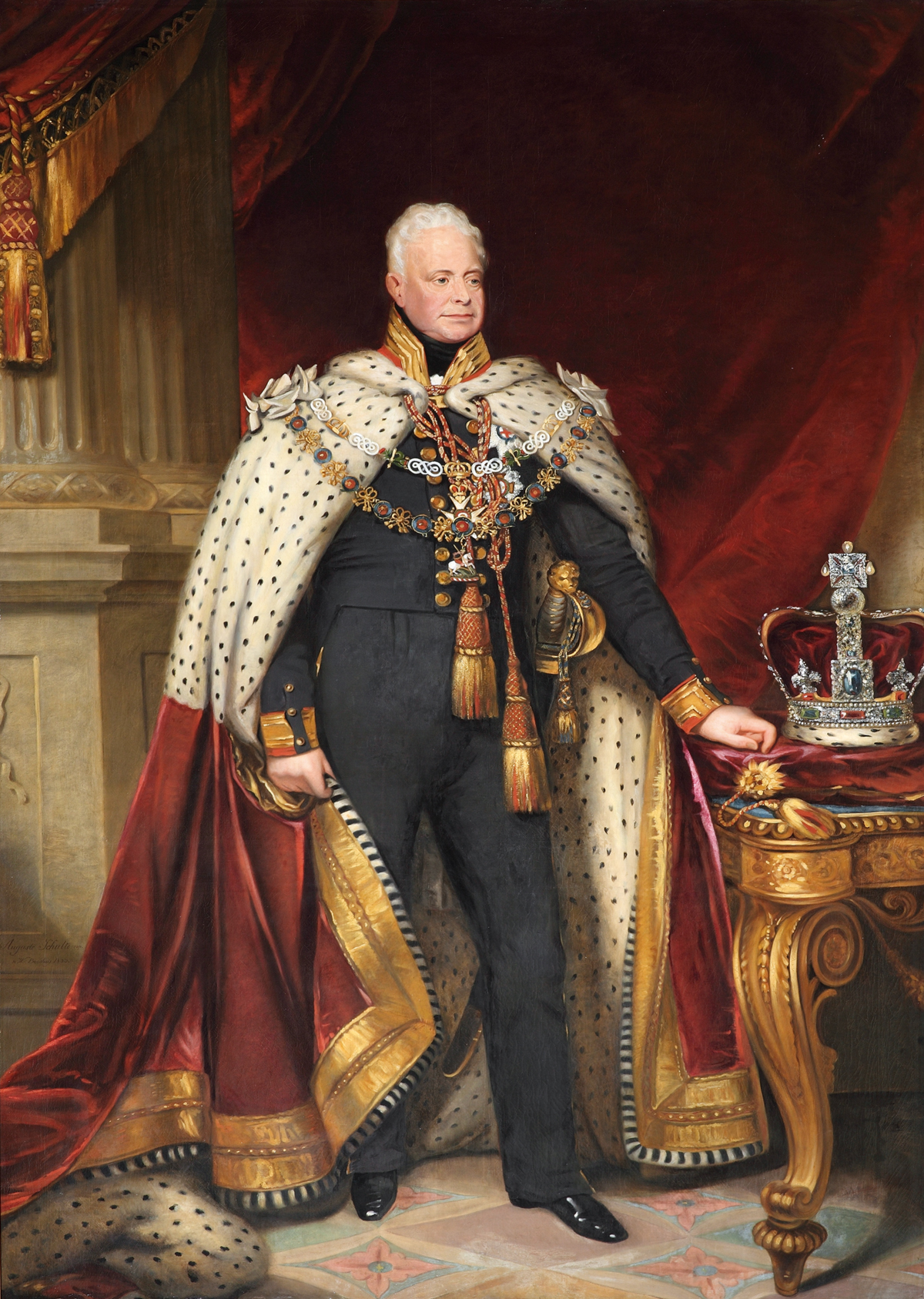
Portrait of William IV by William Beechey

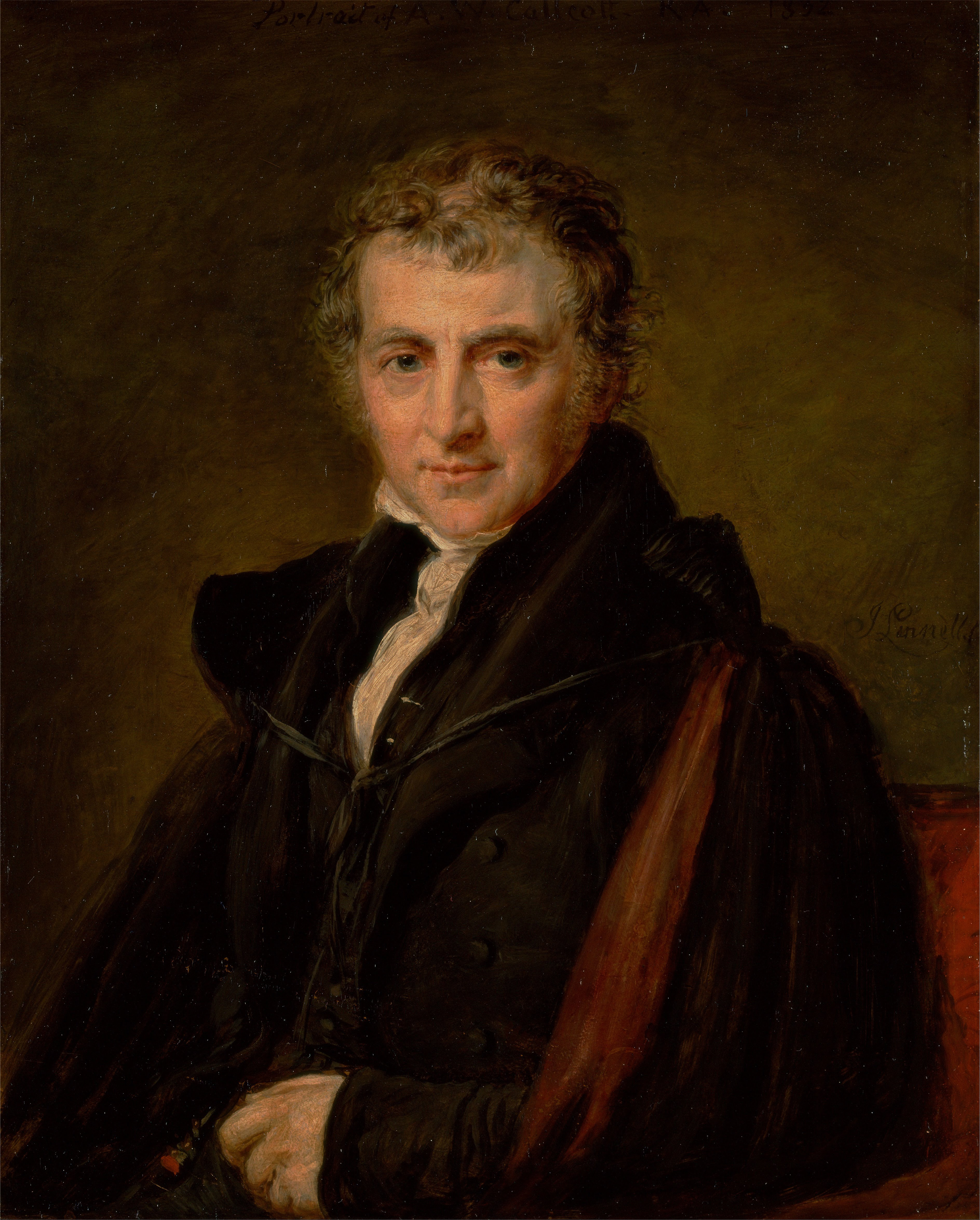
Portrait of Augustus Wall Callcott by John Linnell

Fanny Kemble and Sarah Siddons by Henry Perronet Briggs

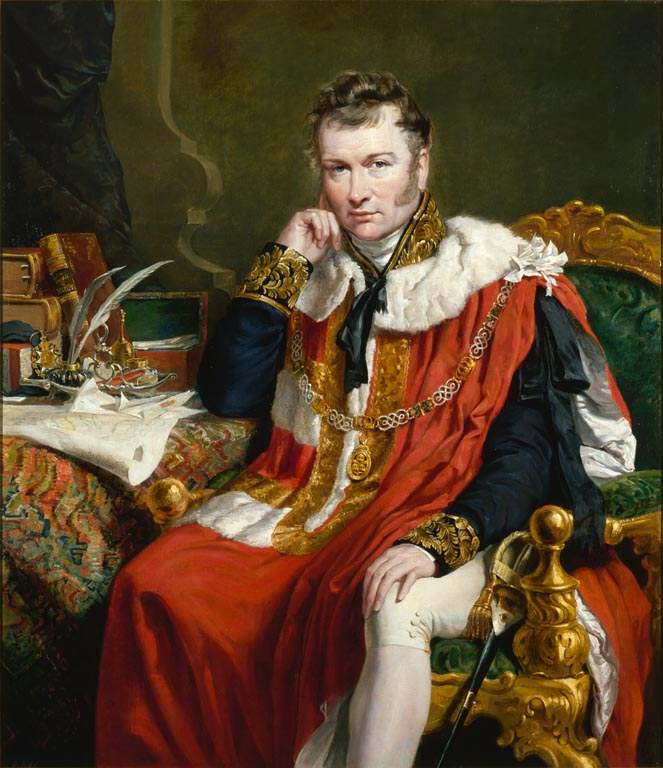
Portrait of Lord Stuart de Rothesay by George Hayter

Portrait of Lord John Russell by George Hayter

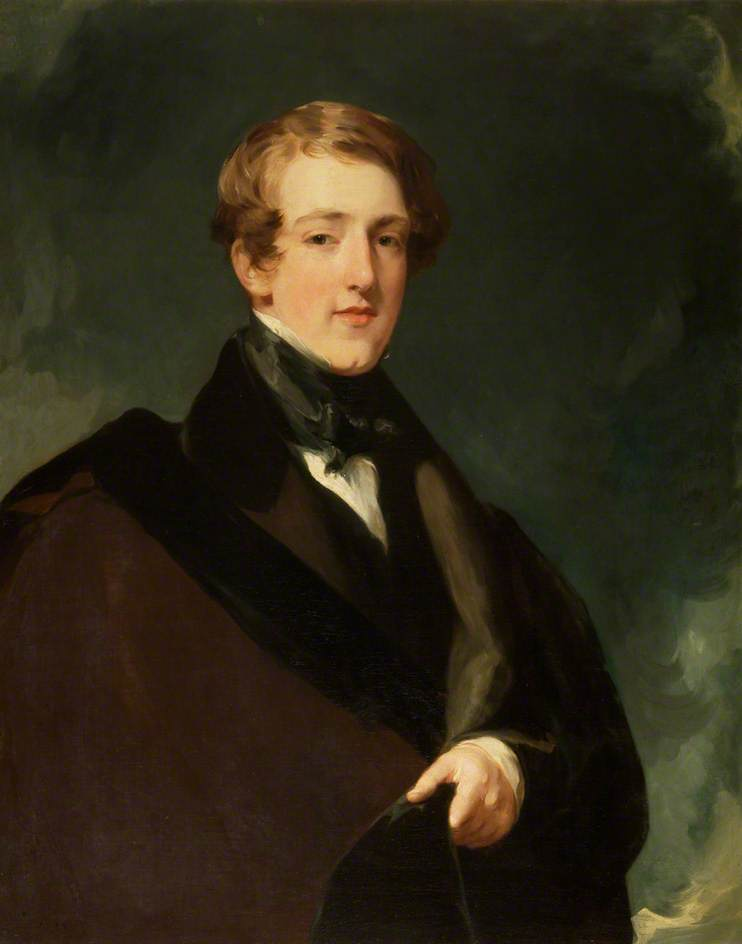
Portrait of Lord De Tabley by Margaret Sarah Carpenter

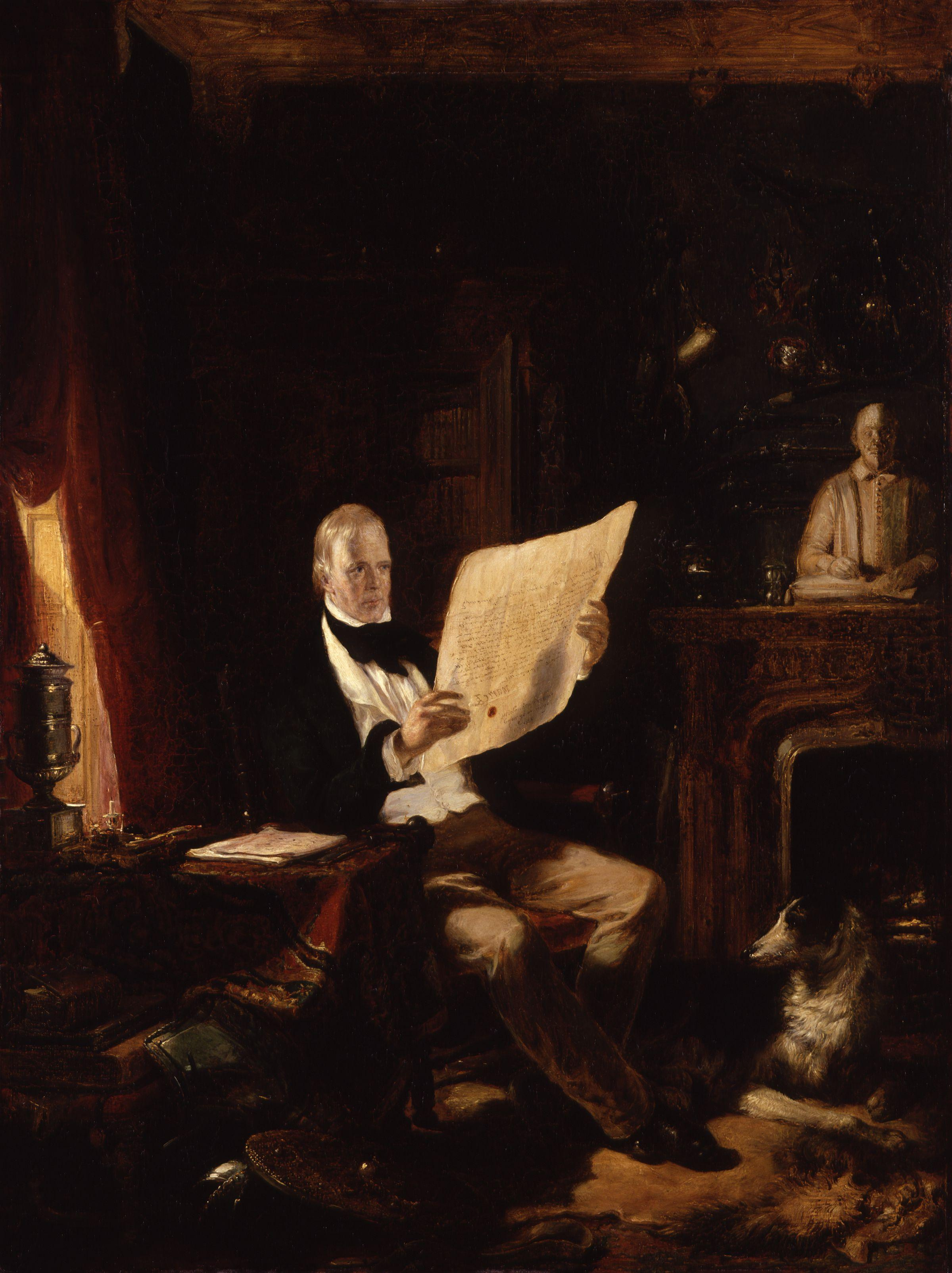
Portrait of Sir Walter Scott by William Allan

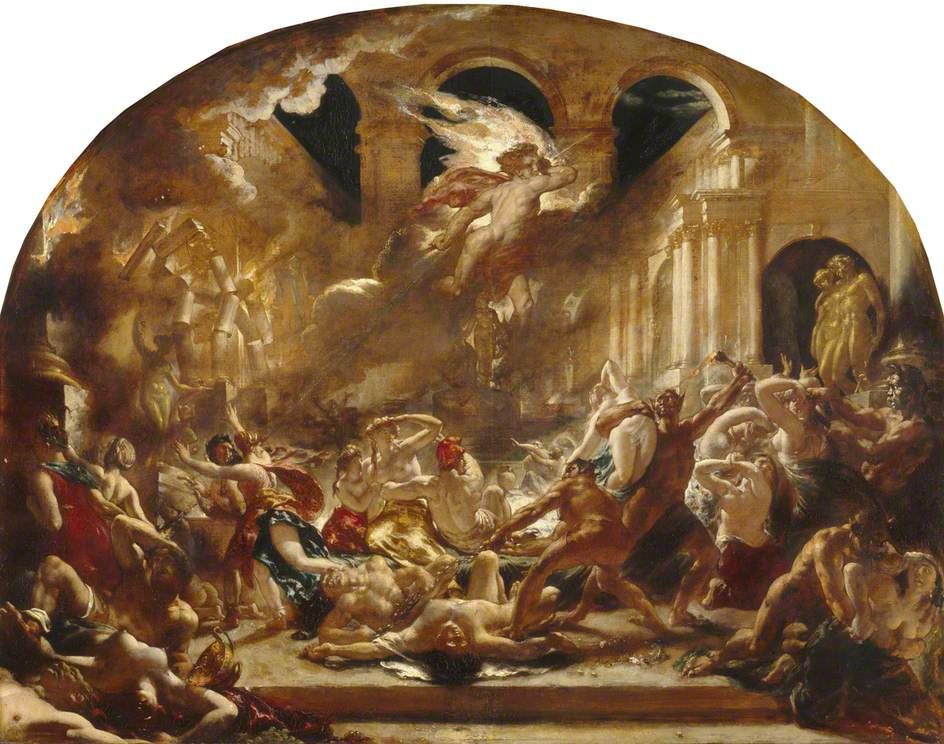
The Destroying Angel by William Etty

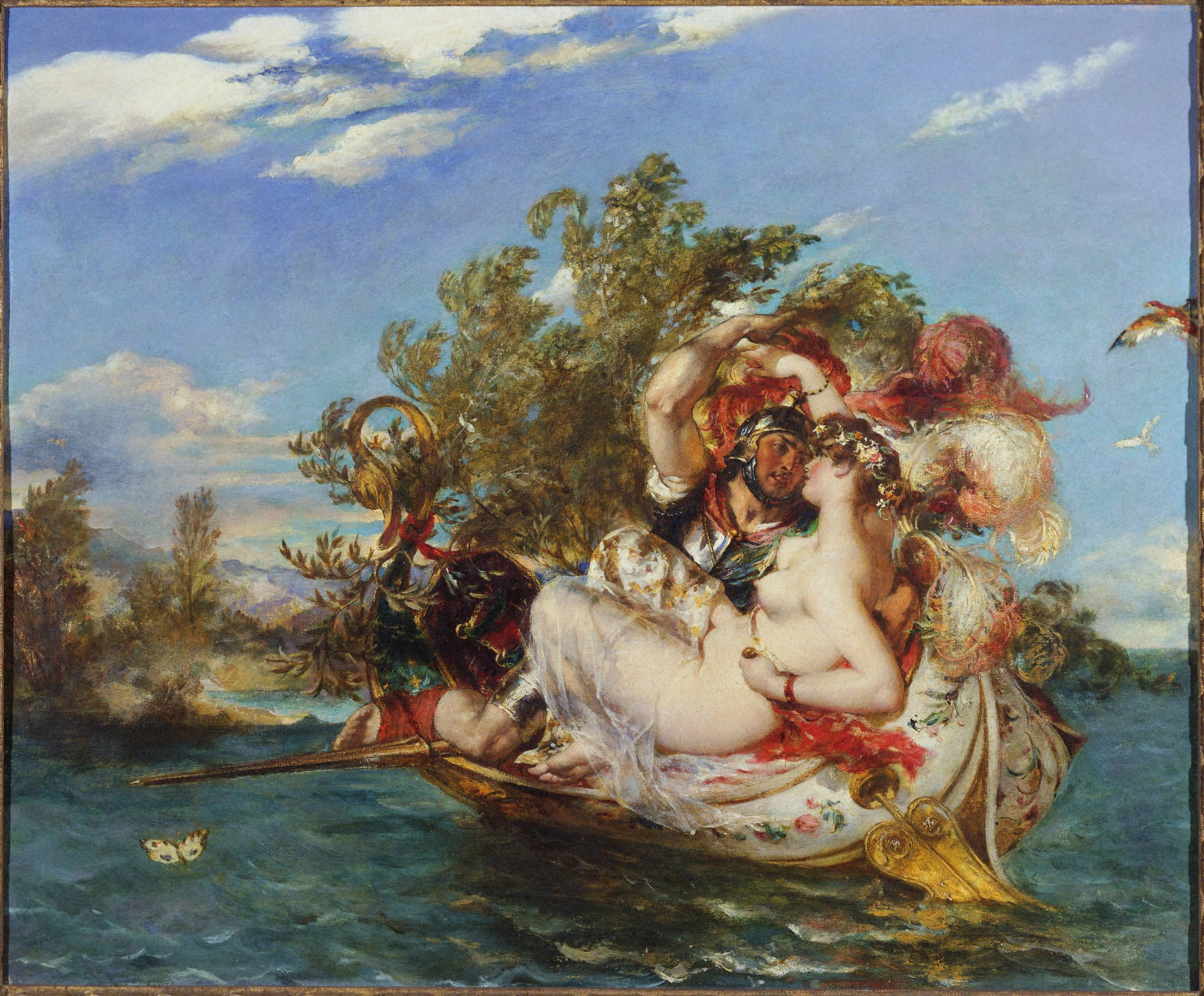
Phaedria and Cymochles by William Etty

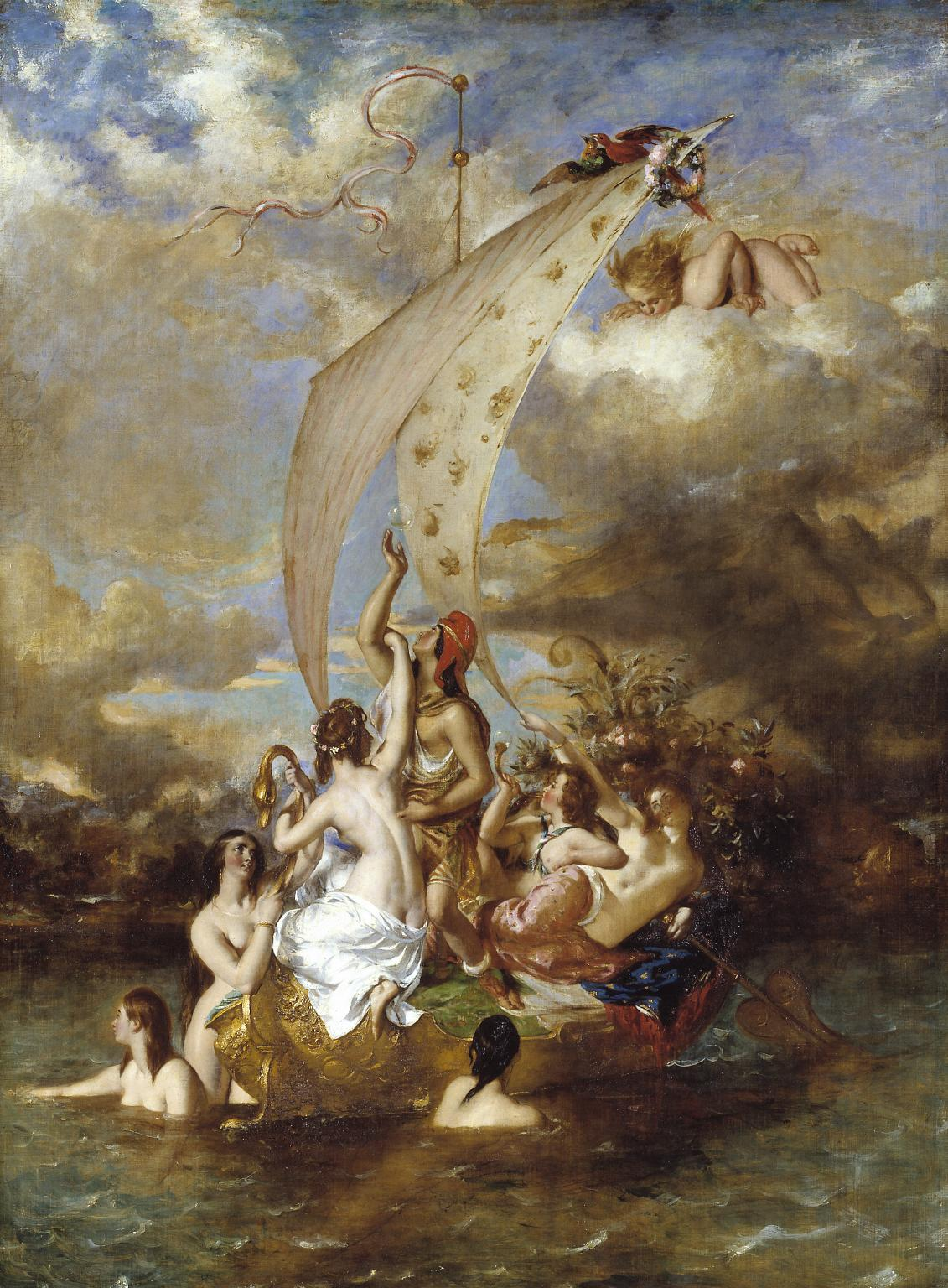
Youth on the Prow, and Pleasure at the Helm by William Etty

== Bibliography ==
- Hamilton, James. Constable: A Portrait. Hachette UK, 2022.
- Hamilton, James. Turner - A Life. Sceptre, 1998.
- Tromans, Nicholas. David Wilkie: The People's Painter. Edinburgh University Press, 2007.
