= The Opening of Waterloo Bridge =

Painting by John Constable

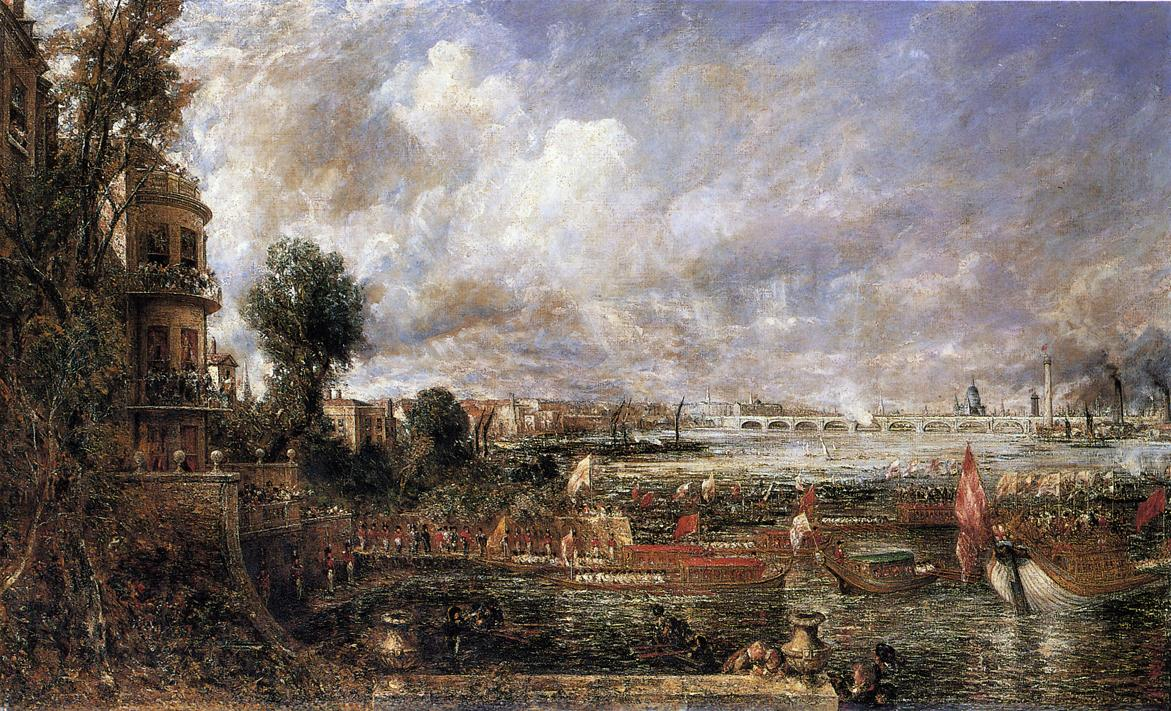
- Artist: John Constable
- Year: 1832
- Type: Landscape painting
- Medium: Oil on canvas
- Dimensions: 130.8 cm × 218 cm (51.5 in × 86 in)
- Location: Tate Britain, London

The Opening of Waterloo Bridge is an 1832 history painting by the British artist John Constable. It depicts the scene on 18 June 1817 when the newly constructed Waterloo Bridge across the River Thames in London was ceremonially opened by the Prince Regent. To distinguish it from other works of the scene by Constable and others, it is known by the longer alternative title Embarkation of George IV from Whitehall: The Opening of Waterloo Bridge, 1817.

The bridge, designed by John Rennie, was opened on the second anniversary of the Battle of Waterloo after which it was named. Constable witnessed the event and made a number of preparatory paintings aimed towards producing a larger canvas to commemorate the event. He found the subject difficult and continually revised the scene. While many of his earlier efforts reflected his traditional style of painting, Constable's artistic style underwent a dramatic change in the late 1820s around the time his wife Maria died in Hampstead. He began to add short sweeps of white to his painting to emphasise light. However his critics derided this and called it "Constable's snow". The final version of the painting, exhibited at the Royal Academy's Summer Exhibition of 1832 reflected this later style.

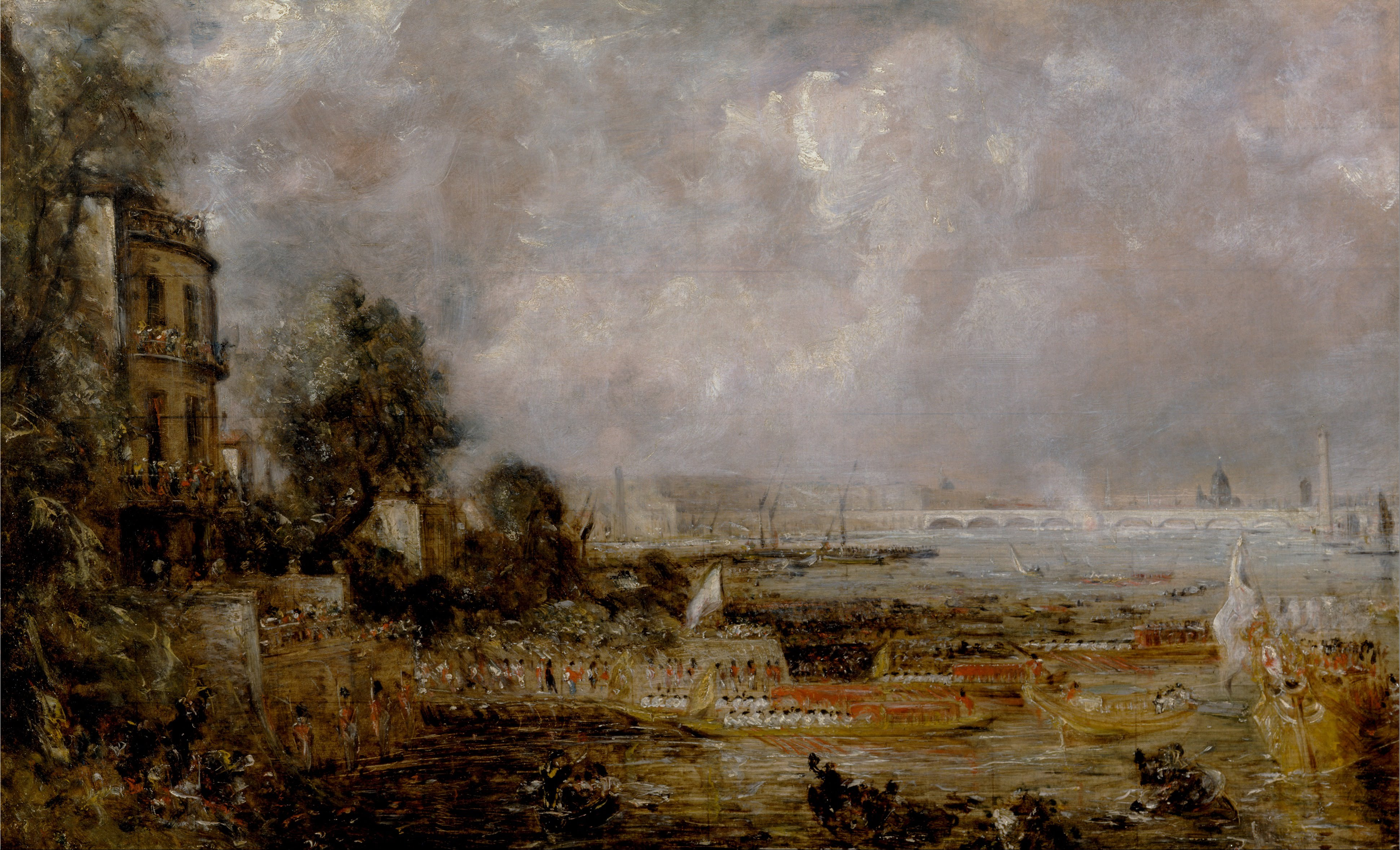
Sketch for the work, 1829-31.

The scene shows several barges leaving for the bridge, led by that of the Prince Regent (by the time the painting was exhibited he had reigned for a decade as George IV before his death in 1830). It is more distant from the earlier Constable paintings which were set closer to bridge and provides a wider panorama of the scene on the Thames. It includes Somerset House close to the new bridge, where the Royal Academy was based. Reflecting the time lapse between the scene depicted and its eventual completion, Constable adds a number of industrial buildings on the South Bank which were not present in 1817.

It is today in the collection of the Tate Britain in Pimlico, having been acquired in 1987. It featured in the 2025 exhibition Turner and Constable: Rivals and Originals.

== See also ==
- List of paintings by John Constable
- Waterloo Bridge (Constable), an 1820 view of the Thames and bridge by Constable
- The Opening of New London Bridge, an 1832 painting by Clarkson Stanfield

== Bibliography ==
- Arnold, George Moss Brock. Gainsborough: Constable. Sampson Low, Marston, Searle, & Rivington, 1881.
- Boucher, Cyril T. G. John Rennie, 1761–1821. Manchester University Press, 1963.
- Noon, Patrick & Bann, Stephen. Constable to Delacroix: British Art and the French Romantics. Tate, 2003.
- Reynolds, Graham. Constable's England. Metropolitan Museum of Art, 1983.
- Sunderland, John. Constable: Colour Library. Phaidon Press, 1998.
