= London Bridge =

1973 Thames road bridge in London

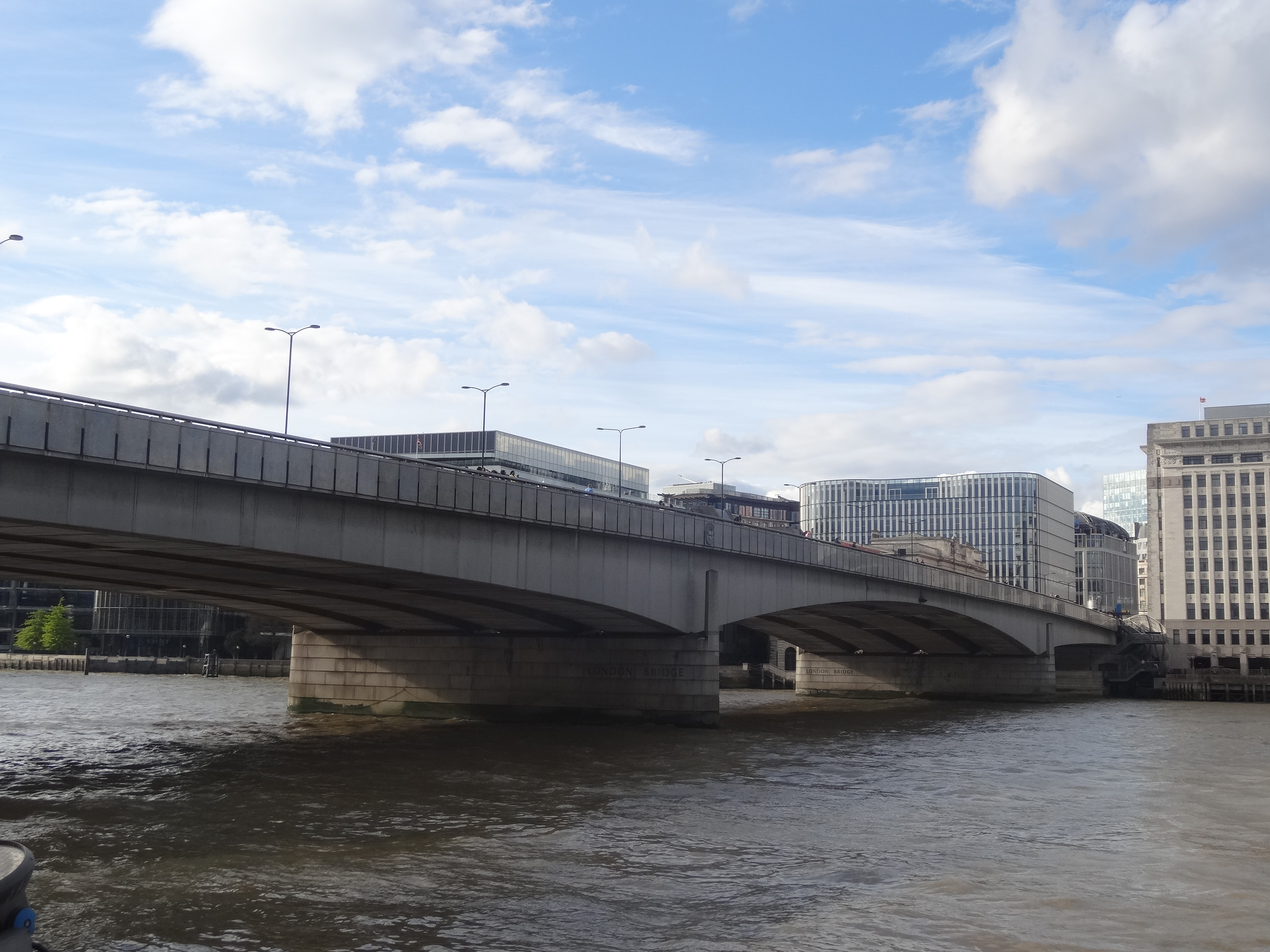
- London Bridge in 2017
- Coordinates: 51°30′29″N 0°05′16″W
- Carries: Five lanes of the A3
- Crosses: River Thames
- Locale: Central London
- Maintained by: Bridge House Estates, City of London Corporation
- Preceded by: Cannon Street Railway Bridge
- Followed by: Tower Bridge

Characteristics
- Design: Prestressed concrete box girder bridge
- Total length: 269 m (882.5 ft)
- Width: 32 m (105.0 ft)
- Longest span: 104 m (341.2 ft)
- Clearance below: 8.9 m (29.2 ft)
- Design life: Modern bridge (1971–present); Victorian stone arch (1832–1968); Medieval stone arch (1176–1832); Various wooden bridges (circa AD 50 – 1176)

History
- Opened: 16 March 1176; 849 years ago

Location
- Interactive map of London Bridge

Since Roman times, several crossings named London Bridge have spanned the River Thames between the City of London and Southwark in central London. The current crossing, which opened to traffic in 1973, is a box girder bridge built from concrete and steel. It replaced a 19th-century stone-arched bridge, which in turn superseded a 600-year-old stone-built medieval structure. In addition to the roadway, for much of its history, the broad medieval bridge supported an extensive built up area of homes and businesses, part of the City's Bridge ward, and its southern end in Southwark was guarded by a large stone City gateway. The medieval bridge was preceded by a succession of timber bridges, the first of which was built by the Roman founders of London (Londinium) around AD 50.

The current bridge stands at the western end of the Pool of London and is positioned 30 metres (98 ft) upstream from the medieval alignment. The approaches to the medieval bridge were marked by the church of St Magnus-the-Martyr on the northern bank and by Southwark Cathedral on the southern shore. Until Putney Bridge opened in 1729, London Bridge was the only road crossing of the Thames downstream of Kingston upon Thames. London Bridge has been depicted in its several forms, in art, literature, and songs, including the nursery rhyme "London Bridge Is Falling Down", and the epic poem The Waste Land by T. S. Eliot.

The modern bridge is owned and maintained by Bridge House Estates, an independent charity of medieval origin overseen by the City of London Corporation. It carries the A3 road, which is maintained by the Greater London Authority. The crossing also delineates an area along the southern bank of the River Thames, between London Bridge and Tower Bridge, that has been designated as a business improvement district.

== History ==
=== Location ===
The abutments of modern London Bridge rest several metres above natural embankments of gravel, sand and clay. From the late Neolithic era the southern embankment formed a natural causeway above the surrounding swamp and marsh of the river's estuary; the northern ascended to higher ground at the present site of Cornhill. Between the embankments, the River Thames could have been crossed by ford when the tide was low, or ferry when it was high. Both embankments, particularly the northern, would have offered stable beachheads for boat traffic up and downstream – the Thames and its estuary were a major inland and Continental trade route from at least the 9th century BC.

There is archaeological evidence for scattered Neolithic, Bronze Age and Iron Age settlement nearby, but until a bridge was built there, London did not exist. A few miles upstream, beyond the river's upper tidal reach, two ancient fords were in use. These were apparently aligned with the course of Watling Street, which led into the heartlands of the Catuvellauni, Britain's most powerful tribe at the time of Caesar's invasion of 54 BC. Some time before Claudius's conquest of AD 43, power shifted to the Trinovantes, who held the region northeast of the Thames Estuary from a capital at Camulodunum, nowadays Colchester in Essex. Claudius imposed a major colonia at Camulodunum, and made it the capital city of the new Roman province of Britannia. The first London Bridge was built by the Romans as part of their road-building programme, to help consolidate their conquest.

=== Roman bridges ===
It is possible that Roman military engineers built a pontoon type bridge at the site during the conquest period (AD 43). A bridge of any kind would have given a rapid overland shortcut to Camulodunum from the southern and Kentish ports, along the Roman roads of Stane Street (now the A3, A24, A29 and A285) and Watling Street (now the A5 to the north of the river and A2 south east through Kent). The Roman roads leading to and from London were probably built around AD 50, and the river-crossing was possibly served by a permanent timber bridge. On the relatively high, dry ground at the northern end of the bridge, a small, opportunistic trading and shipping settlement took root and grew into the town of Londinium.

A smaller settlement developed at the southern end of the bridge, in the area now known as Southwark. The bridge may have been destroyed along with the town in the Boudican revolt (AD 60), but Londinium was rebuilt and eventually became the administrative and mercantile capital of Roman Britain. The bridge offered uninterrupted, mass movement of foot, horse, and wheeled traffic across the Thames, linking four major arterial road systems north of the Thames with four to the south. Just downstream of the bridge were substantial quays and depots, convenient to seagoing trade between Britain and the rest of the Roman Empire.

=== Early medieval bridges ===
With the end of Roman rule in Britain in the early 5th century, Londinium was gradually abandoned and the bridge fell into disrepair. In the Anglo-Saxon period, the river became a boundary between the emergent, mutually hostile kingdoms of Mercia and Wessex. By the late 9th century, Danish invasions prompted at least a partial reoccupation of the site by the Saxons. The bridge may have been rebuilt by Alfred the Great soon after the Battle of Edington as part of Alfred's redevelopment of the area in his system of burhs, or it may have been rebuilt around 990 under the Saxon king Æthelred the Unready to hasten his troop movements against Sweyn Forkbeard, father of Cnut the Great. A skaldic tradition describes the bridge's destruction in 1014 by Æthelred's ally Olaf, to divide the Danish forces who held both the walled City of London and Southwark. The earliest contemporary written reference to a Saxon bridge is c. 1016, when chroniclers mention how Cnut's ships bypassed the crossing during his war to regain the throne from Edmund Ironside.

Following the Norman Conquest in 1066, King William I rebuilt the bridge. It was repaired or replaced by King William II, destroyed by fire in 1136, and rebuilt in the reign of Stephen. Henry II created a monastic guild, the "Brethren of the Bridge", to oversee all work on London Bridge. In 1163, Peter of Colechurch, chaplain and warden of the bridge and its brethren, supervised the bridge's last rebuilding in timber.

=== Old London Bridge (1209–1831) ===
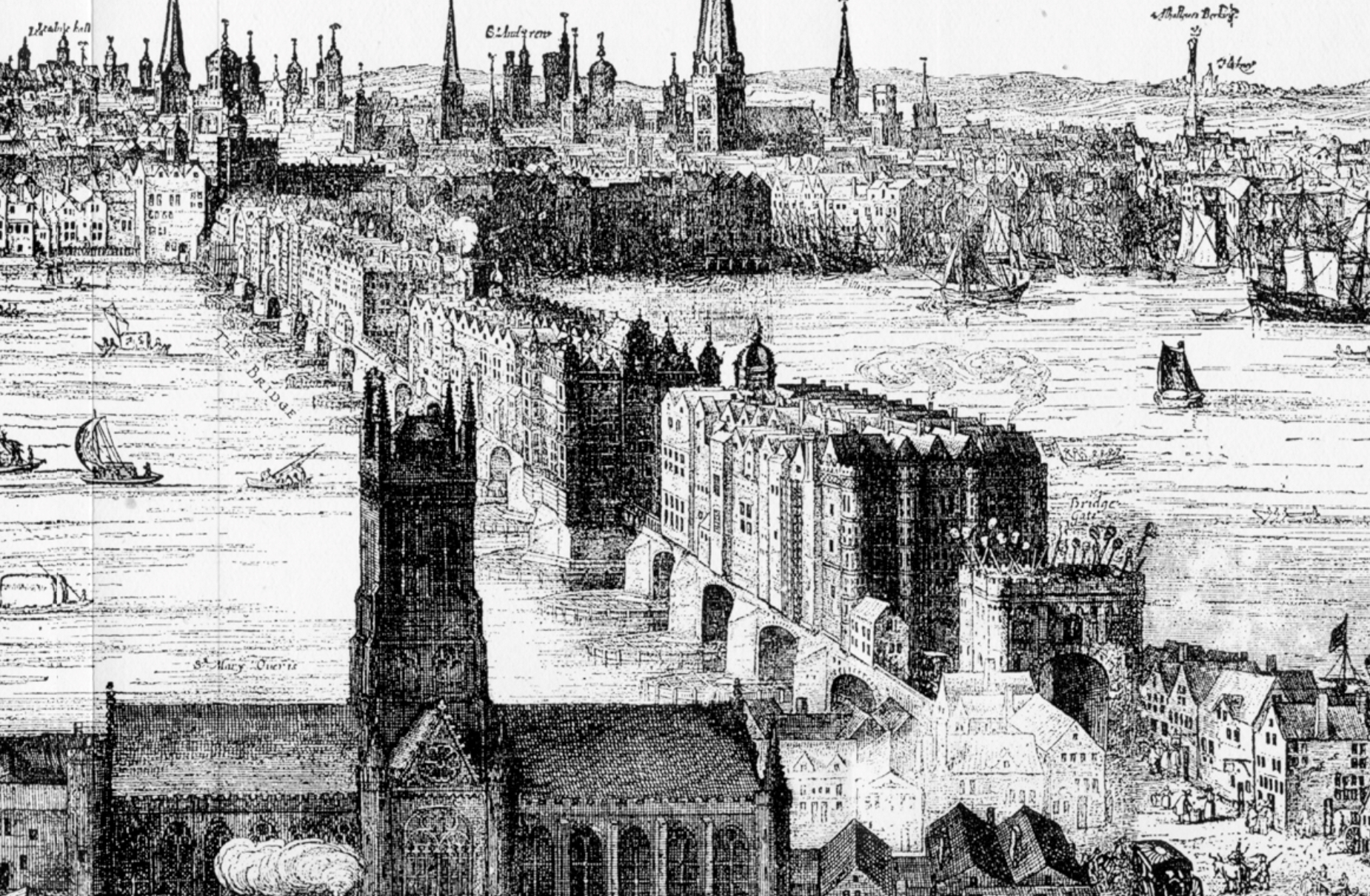
An engraving by Claes Visscher showing Old London Bridge in 1616, with what is now Southwark Cathedral in the foreground. The spiked heads of executed criminals can be seen above the Southwark gatehouse.

After the murder of his former friend and later opponent Thomas Becket, Archbishop of Canterbury, the penitent Henry II commissioned a new stone bridge in place of the old, with a chapel at its centre dedicated to Becket as martyr. The archbishop had been a native Londoner, born at Cheapside, and a popular figure. The Chapel of St Thomas on the Bridge became the official start of pilgrimage to his Canterbury shrine; it was grander than some town parish churches, and had an additional river-level entrance for fishermen and ferrymen. Building work began in 1176, supervised by Peter of Colechurch. The costs would have been enormous; Henry's attempt to meet them with taxes on wool and sheepskins probably gave rise to a later legend that London Bridge was built on wool packs.

In 1202, before Colechurch's death, Isembert, a French monk who was renowned as a bridge builder, was appointed by King John to complete the project. Construction was not finished until 1209. There were houses on the bridge from the start; this was a normal way of paying for the maintenance of a bridge, though in this case it had to be supplemented by other rents and by tolls. From 1282 two Bridge wardens headed an organisation known as Bridge House, appointed to maintain the bridge fabric. Neglect of this duty was blamed for two known collapses of the bridge, one in 1281 (involving five arches) and one in 1437 (involving two arches). In 1212, perhaps the greatest of the early fires of London broke out, spreading as far as the chapel and trapping many people.

The bridge was about 926 feet (282 metres) long, and had nineteen piers, supported by timber piles. The piers were linked above by nineteen arches and a wooden drawbridge. Above and below the water-level, the piers were enclosed and protected by 'starlings', supported by deeper piles than the piers themselves. The bridge, including the part occupied by houses, was from 20 to 24 feet (6.1 to 7.3 metres) wide. The roadway was mostly around 15 feet (4.6 metres) wide, varying from about 14 feet to 16 feet, except that it was narrower at defensive features (the stone gate, the drawbridge and the drawbridge tower) and wider south of the stone gate. The houses occupied only a few feet on each side of the bridge. They received their main support either from the piers, which extended well beyond the bridge itself from west to east, or from 'hammer beams' laid from pier to pier parallel to the bridge. It was the length of the piers which made it possible to build quite large houses, up to 34 feet (10 metres) deep.

The numerous starlings restricted the river's tidal ebb and flow. The difference in water levels on the two sides of the bridge could be as much as 6 feet (1.8 m), producing ferocious rapids between the piers resembling a weir. Only the brave or foolhardy attempted to "shoot the bridge" – steer a boat between the starlings when in flood – and some were drowned in the attempt. The bridge was "for wise men to pass over, and for fools to pass under." The restricted flow also meant that in hard winters the river upstream was more susceptible to freezing.

The number of houses on the bridge reached its maximum in the late fourteenth century, when there were 140. Subsequently, many of the houses, originally only 10 to 11 feet wide, were merged, so that by 1605 there were 91. Originally they are likely to have had only two storeys, but they were gradually enlarged. In the seventeenth century, when there are detailed descriptions of them, almost all had four or five storeys (counting the garrets as a storey); three houses had six storeys. Two-thirds of the houses were rebuilt from 1477 to 1548. In the seventeenth century, the usual plan was a shop on the ground floor, a hall and often a chamber on the first floor, a kitchen and usually a chamber and a waterhouse (for hauling up water in buckets) on the second floor, and chambers and garrets above. Approximately every other house shared in a 'cross building' above the roadway, linking the houses either side and extending from the first floor upwards.

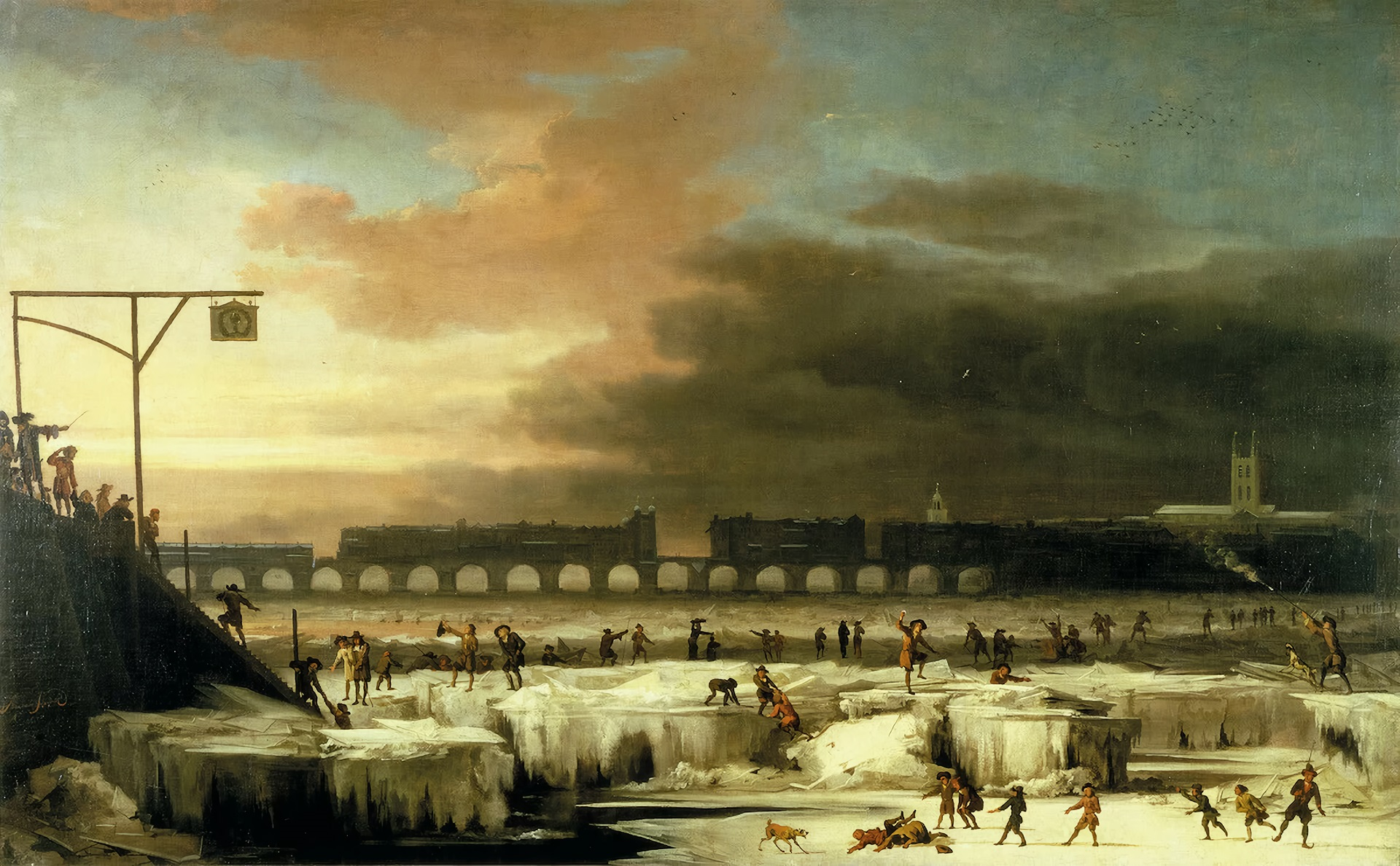
The Frozen Thames (1677) by Abraham Hondius in the Museum of London, showing Old London Bridge and Southwark Cathedral (St Saviours) at right

All the houses were shops, and the bridge was one of the City of London's four or five main shopping streets. There seems to have been a deliberate attempt to attract the more prestigious trades. In the late fourteenth century more than four-fifths of the shopkeepers were haberdashers, glovers, cutlers, bowyers and fletchers or from related trades. By 1600 all of these had dwindled except the haberdashers, and the spaces were filled by additional haberdashers, by traders selling textiles and by grocers. From the late seventeenth century there was a greater variety of trades, including metalworkers such as pinmakers and needle makers, sellers of durable goods such as trunks and brushes, booksellers and stationers.

The three major buildings on the bridge were the chapel, the drawbridge tower and the stone gate, all of which seem to have been present soon after the bridge's construction. The chapel was last rebuilt in 1387–1396, by Henry Yevele, master mason to the king. Following the Reformation, it was converted into a house in 1553. The drawbridge tower was where the severed heads of traitors were exhibited. The drawbridge ceased to be opened in the 1470s and in 1577–1579 the tower was replaced by Nonsuch House—a pair of magnificent houses. Its architect was Lewis Stockett, Surveyor of the Queen's Works, who gave it the second classical facade in London (after Somerset House in the Strand). The stone gate was last rebuilt in the 1470s, and later took over the function of displaying the heads of traitors. The heads were dipped in tar and boiled to preserve them against the elements, and were impaled on pikes. The head of William Wallace was the first recorded as appearing, in 1305, starting a long tradition. Other famous heads on pikes included those of Jack Cade in 1450, Thomas More in 1535, Bishop John Fisher in the same year, and Thomas Cromwell in 1540. In 1598, a German visitor to London, Paul Hentzner, counted over 30 heads on the bridge:

On the south is a bridge of stone eight hundred feet in length, of wonderful work; it is supported upon twenty piers of square stone, sixty feet high and thirty broad, joined by arches of about twenty feet diameter. The whole is covered on each side with houses so disposed as to have the appearance of a continued street, not at all of a bridge. Upon this is built a tower, on whose top the heads of such as have been executed for high treason are placed on iron spikes: we counted above thirty.

The last head was installed in 1661; subsequently heads were placed on Temple Bar instead, until the practice ceased.

There were two multi-seated public latrines, but they seem to have been at the two ends of the bridge, possibly on the riverbank. The one at the north end had two entrances in 1306. In 1481, one of the latrines fell into the Thames and five men were drowned. Neither of the latrines is recorded after 1591.

In 1578–1582 a Dutchman, Peter Morris, created a waterworks at the north end of the bridge. Water wheels under the two northernmost arches drove pumps that raised water to the top of a tower, from which wooden pipes conveyed it into the city. In 1591 water wheels were installed at the south end of the bridge to grind corn.

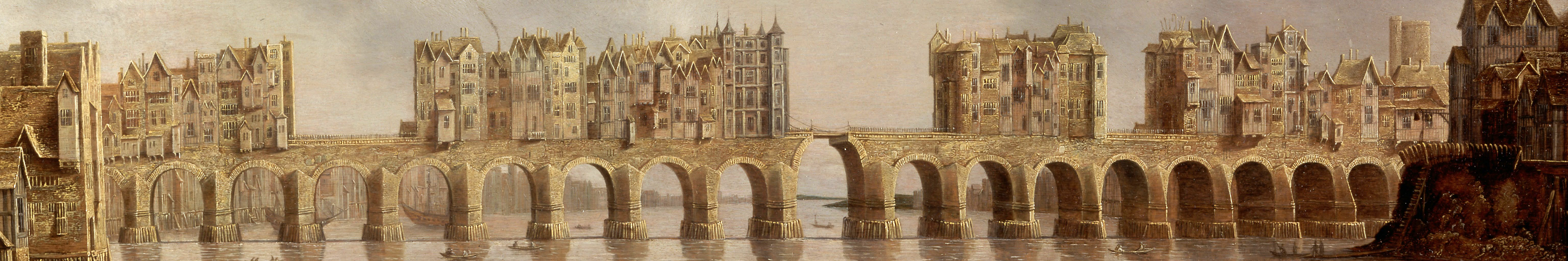
Detail of Old London Bridge on the 1632 oil painting View of London Bridge by Claude de Jongh, in the Yale Center for British Art

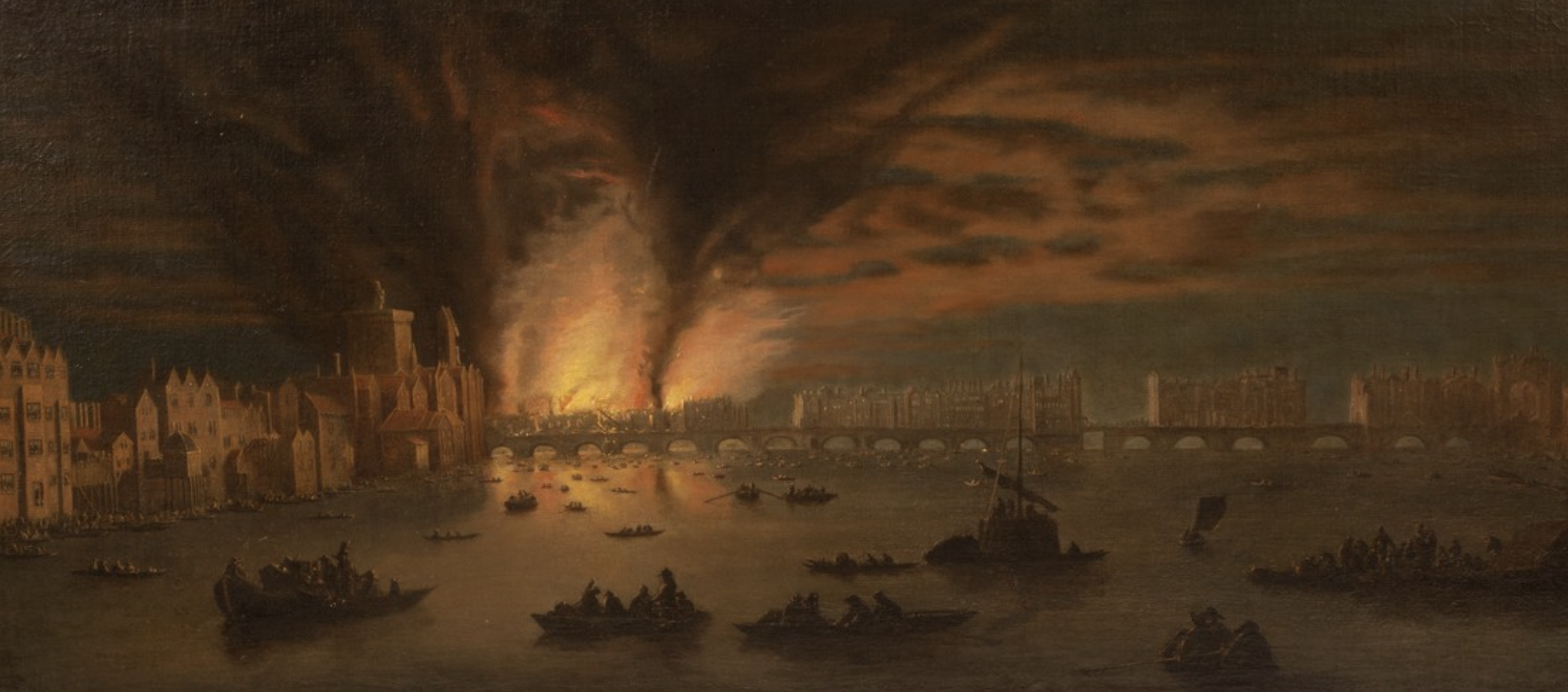
A view of London Bridge burning in the fire of 1633 Private Collection

In 1633 fire destroyed the houses on the northern part of the bridge. The gap was only partly filled by new houses, with the result that there was a firebreak that prevented the Great Fire of London (1666) spreading to the rest of the bridge and to Southwark. The Great Fire destroyed the bridge's waterwheels, preventing them from pumping water to fight the fire. For nearly 20 years, only sheds replaced the burnt buildings. They were replaced In the 1680s, when almost all the houses on the bridge were rebuilt. The roadway was widened to 20 feet (6.1 metres) by setting the houses further back, and was increased in height from one storey to two. The new houses extended further back over the river, which would cause trouble later.

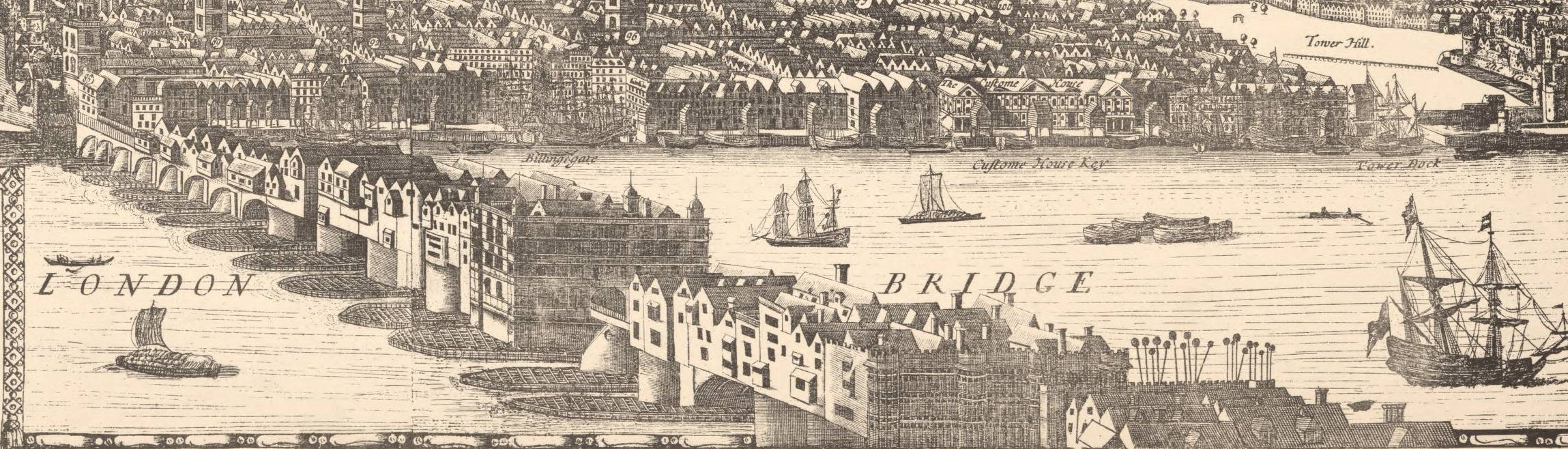
Drawing of London Bridge from a 1682 panorama

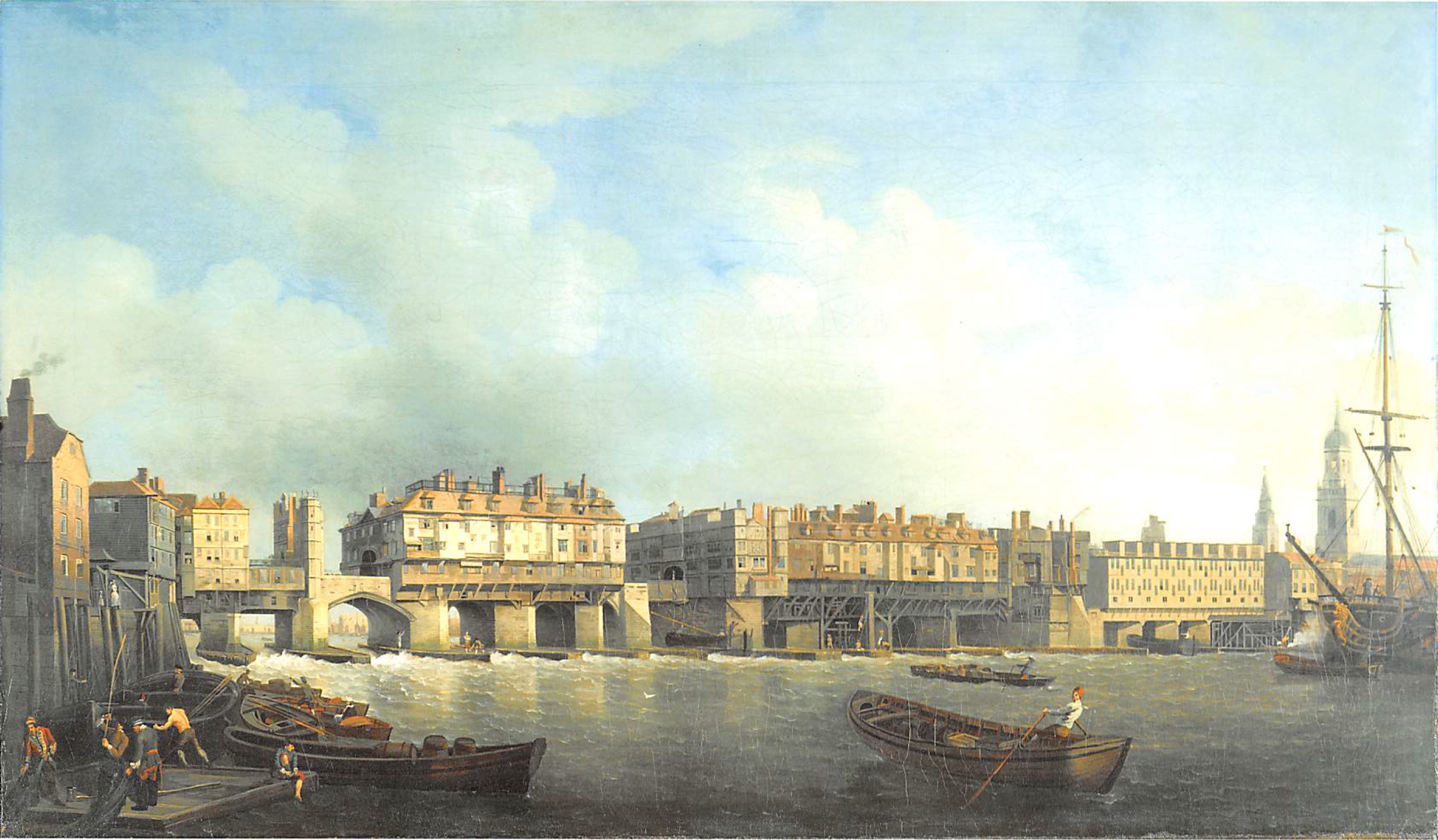
London Bridge in 1757 just before the removal of the houses, by Samuel Scott

In 1695, the bridge had 551 inhabitants. From 1670, attempts were made to keep traffic in each direction to one side, at first through a keep-right policy and from 1722, through a keep-left policy. This has been suggested as one possible origin for the practice of traffic in Britain driving on the left.

London Bridge Act 1756
- Act of Parliament
- Parliament of Great Britain
- Long title: An Act to improve, widen, and enlarge, the Passage over and through London Bridge.
- Citation: 29 Geo. 2. c. 40
- Territorial extent: Great Britain

Dates
- Royal assent: 27 May 1756
- Commencement: 24 June 1756 (Note: Section 1.)

Status: Current legislation

Text of statute as originally enacted

A fire in September 1725 destroyed all the houses south of the stone gate; they were rebuilt. The last houses to be built on the bridge were designed by George Dance the Elder in 1745, but these buildings had begun to subside within a decade. The London Bridge Act 1756 (29 Geo. 2. c. 40) gave the City Corporation the power to purchase all the properties on the bridge so that they could be demolished and the bridge improved. While this work was underway, a temporary wooden bridge was constructed to the west of London Bridge. It opened in October 1757 but caught fire and collapsed in the following April. The old bridge was reopened until a new wooden construction could be completed a year later. To help improve navigation under the bridge, its two centre arches were replaced by a single wider span, the Great Arch, in 1759.

Demolition of the houses was completed in 1761 and the last tenant departed after some 550 years of housing on the bridge. Under the supervision of Dance the Elder, the roadway was widened to 46 feet (14 m) and a balustrade was added "in the Gothic taste" together with 14 stone alcoves for pedestrians to shelter in. However, the creation of the Great Arch had weakened the rest of the structure and constant expensive repairs were required in the following decades; this, combined with congestion both on and under bridge, often leading to fatal accidents, resulted in public pressure for a modern replacement.

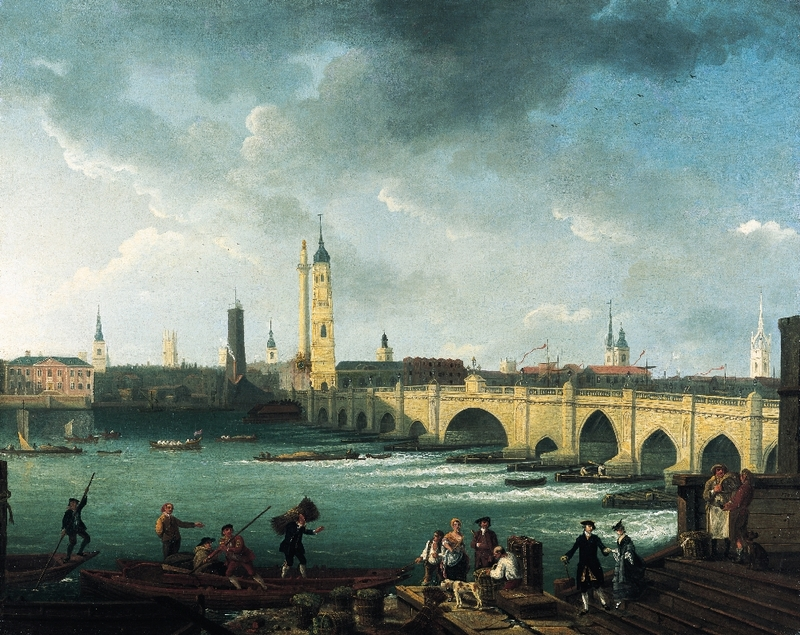
London Bridge from Pepper Alley Stairs by Herbert Pugh, showing the appearance of London Bridge after 1762, with the new "Great Arch" at the centre

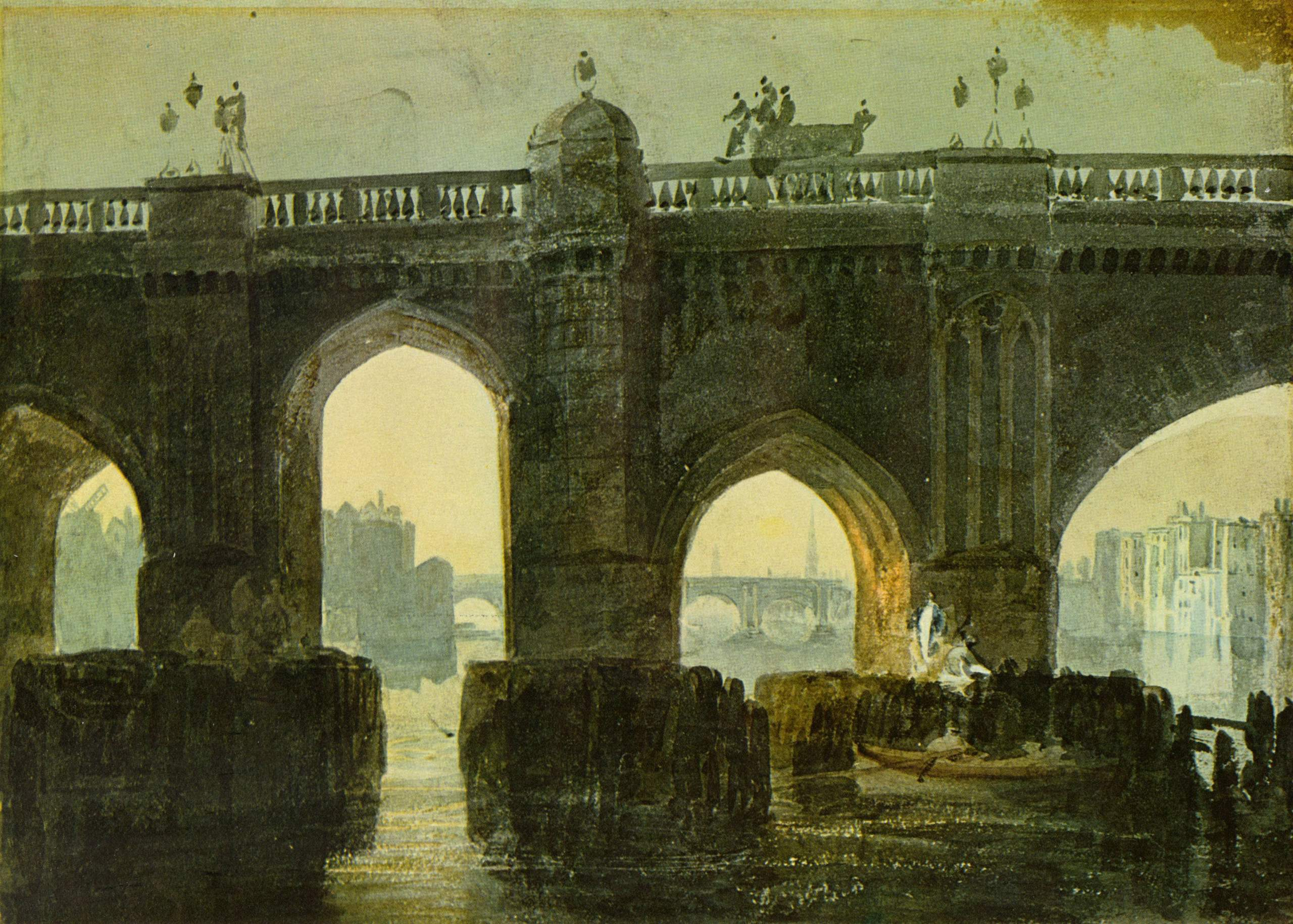
Old London Bridge by J. M. W. Turner, showing the new balustrade and the back of one of the pedestrian alcoves

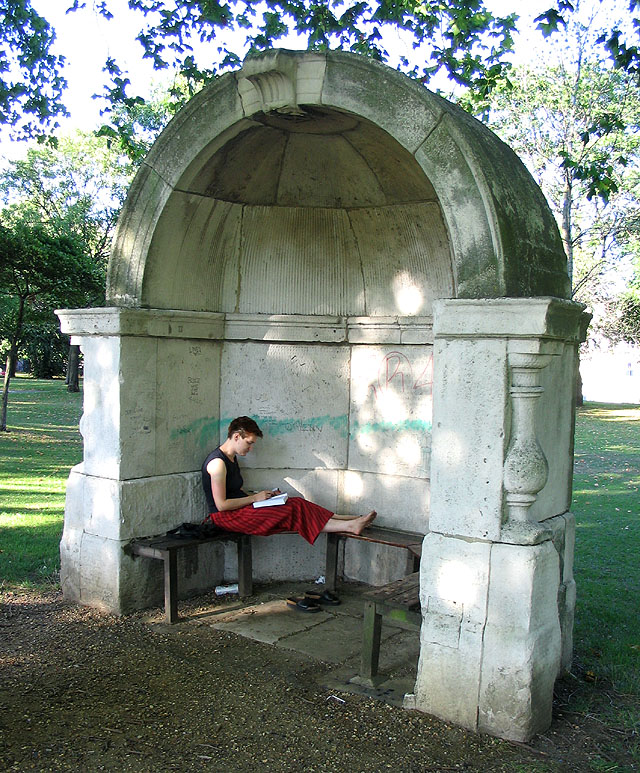
One of the pedestrian alcoves from the 1762 renovation, now in Victoria Park, Tower Hamlets – a similar alcove from the same source can be seen at the Guy's Campus of King's College London

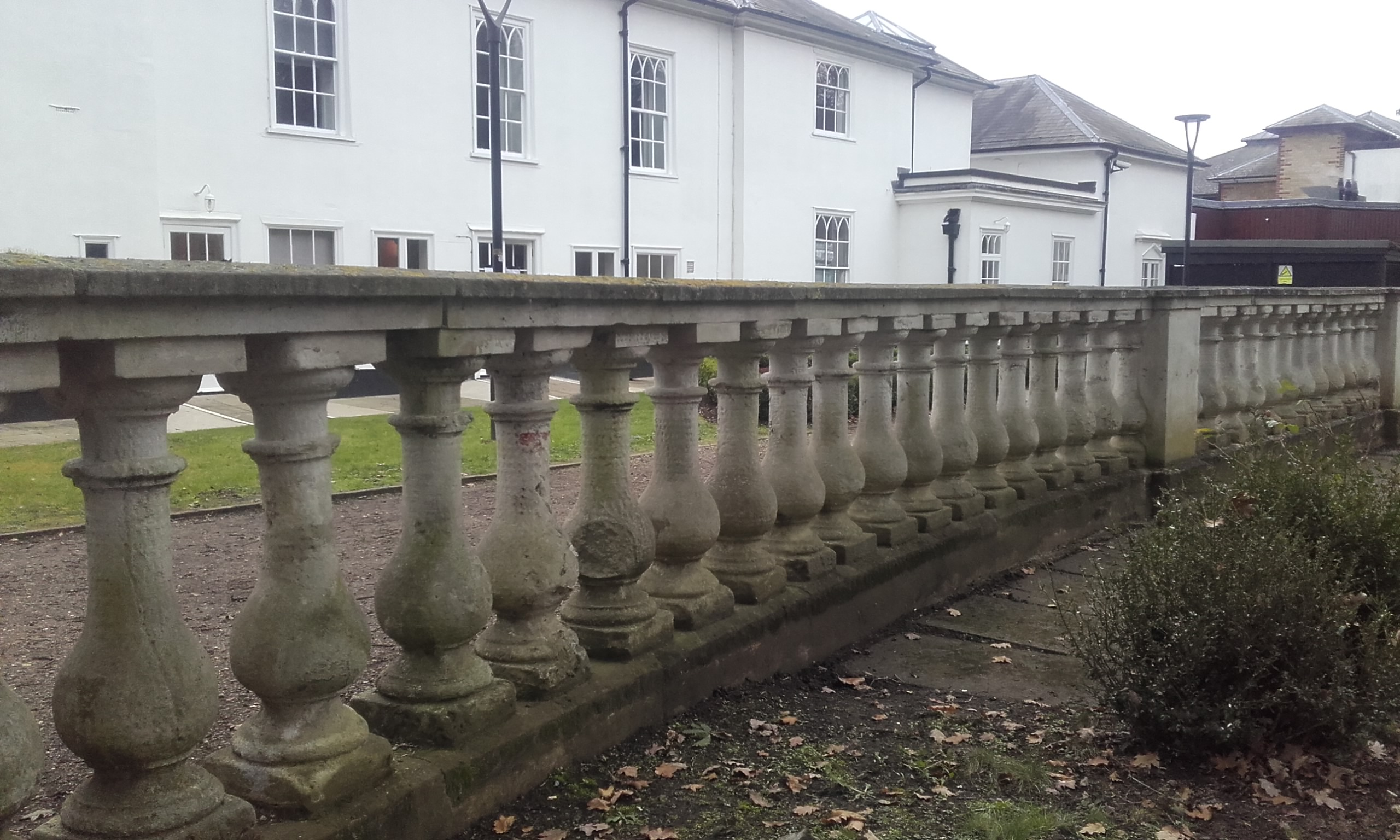
A section of balustrade from London Bridge, now at Gilwell Park in Essex

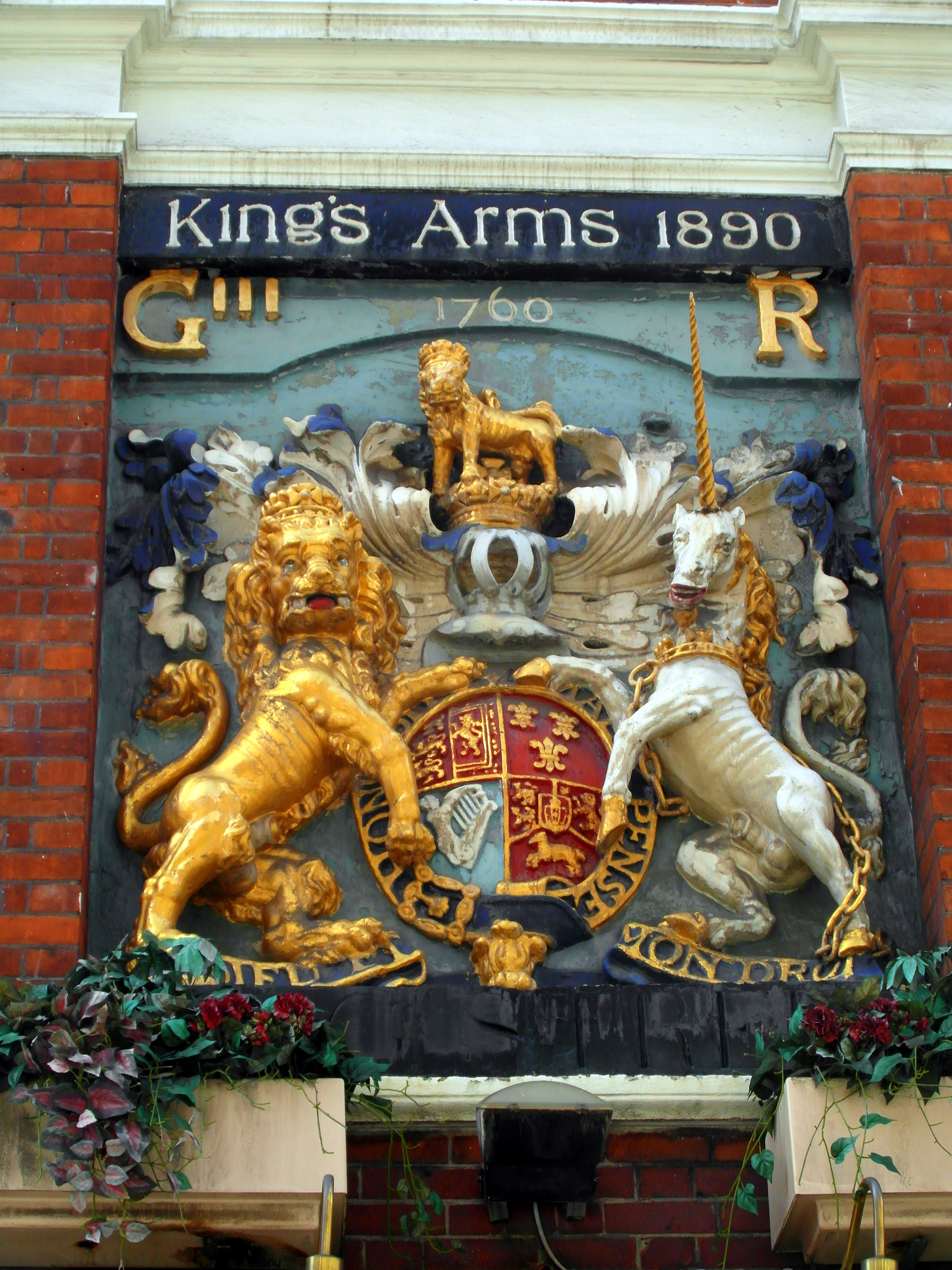
A relief of the Hanoverian Royal Arms from a gateway over the old London Bridge now forms part of the façade of the King's Arms pub, Southwark

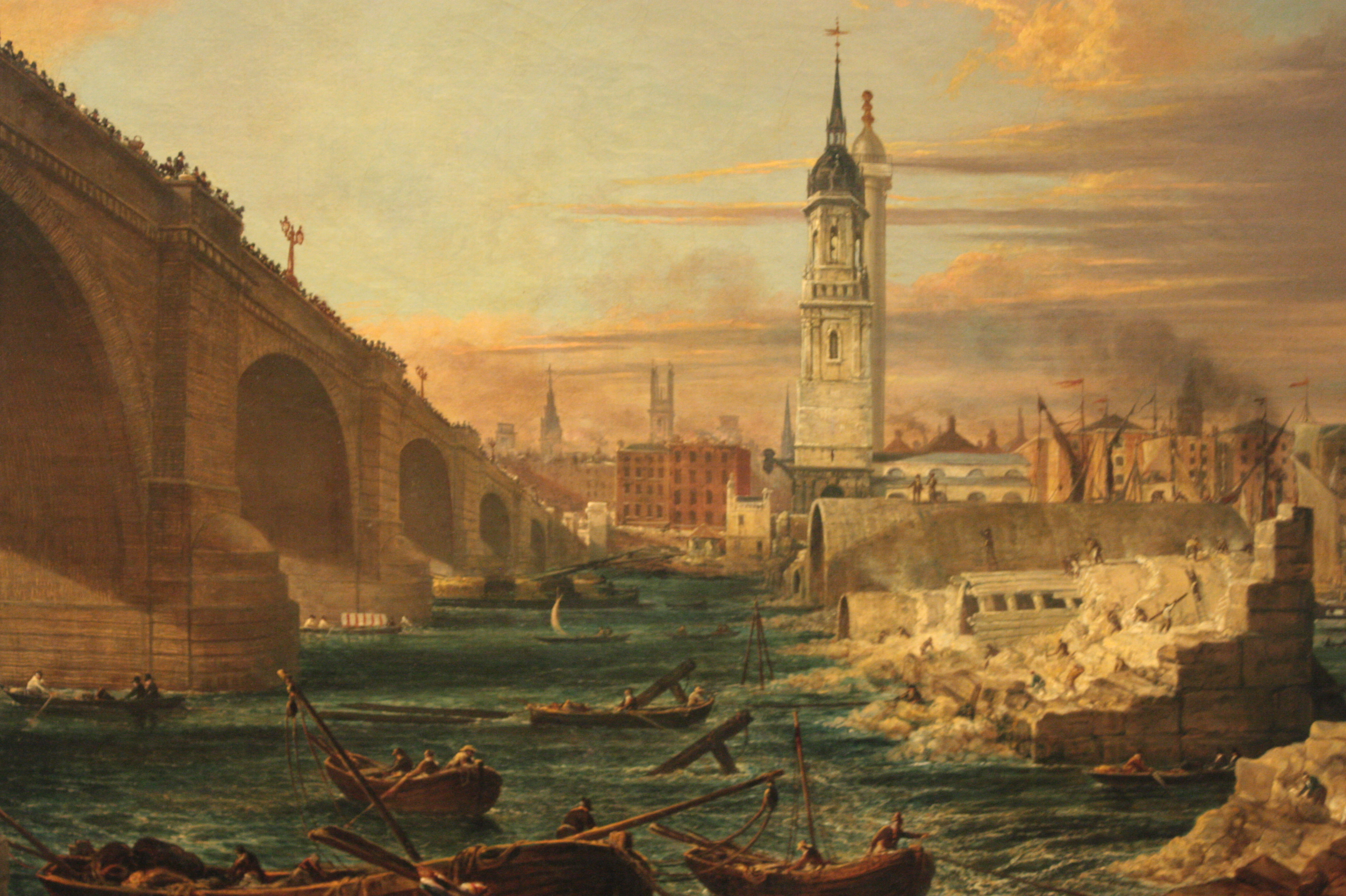
The Demolition of Old London Bridge, 1832, Guildhall Gallery, London

=== New London Bridge (1831–1967) ===
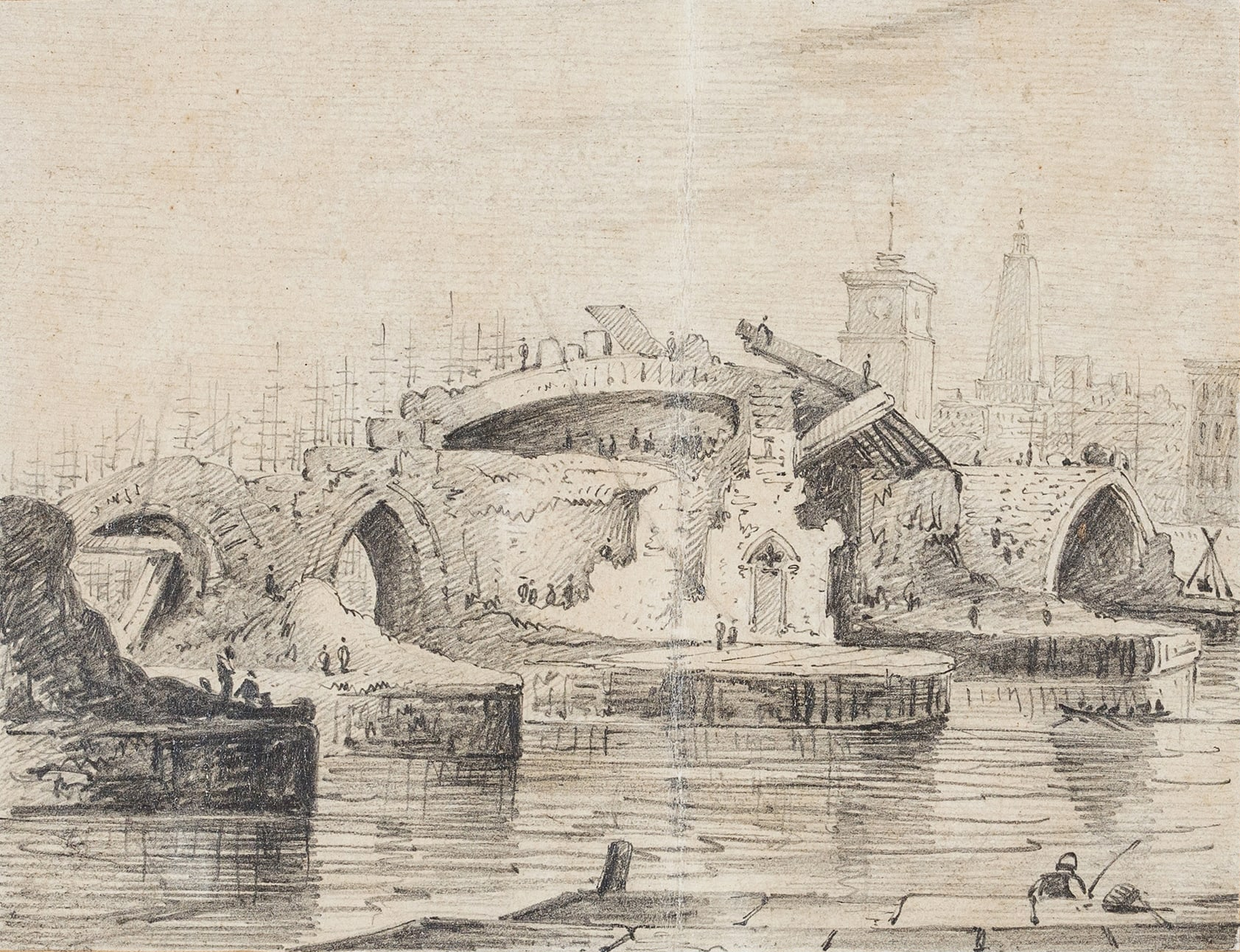
The remains of the bridge, as sketched by William Alfred Delamotte on 30 March 1832

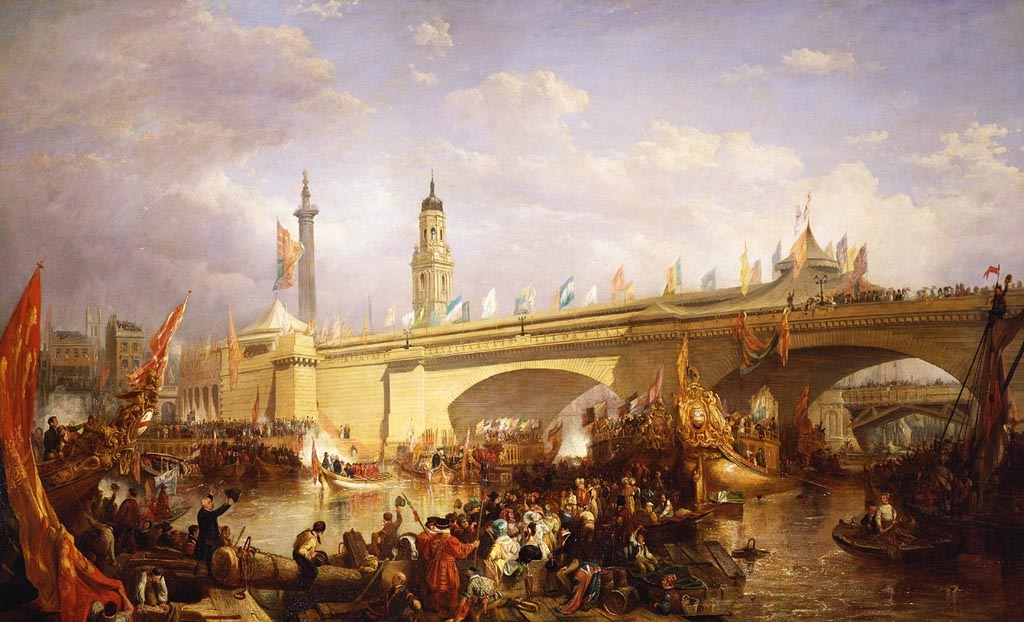
The Opening of New London Bridge by Clarkson Stanfield, 1832

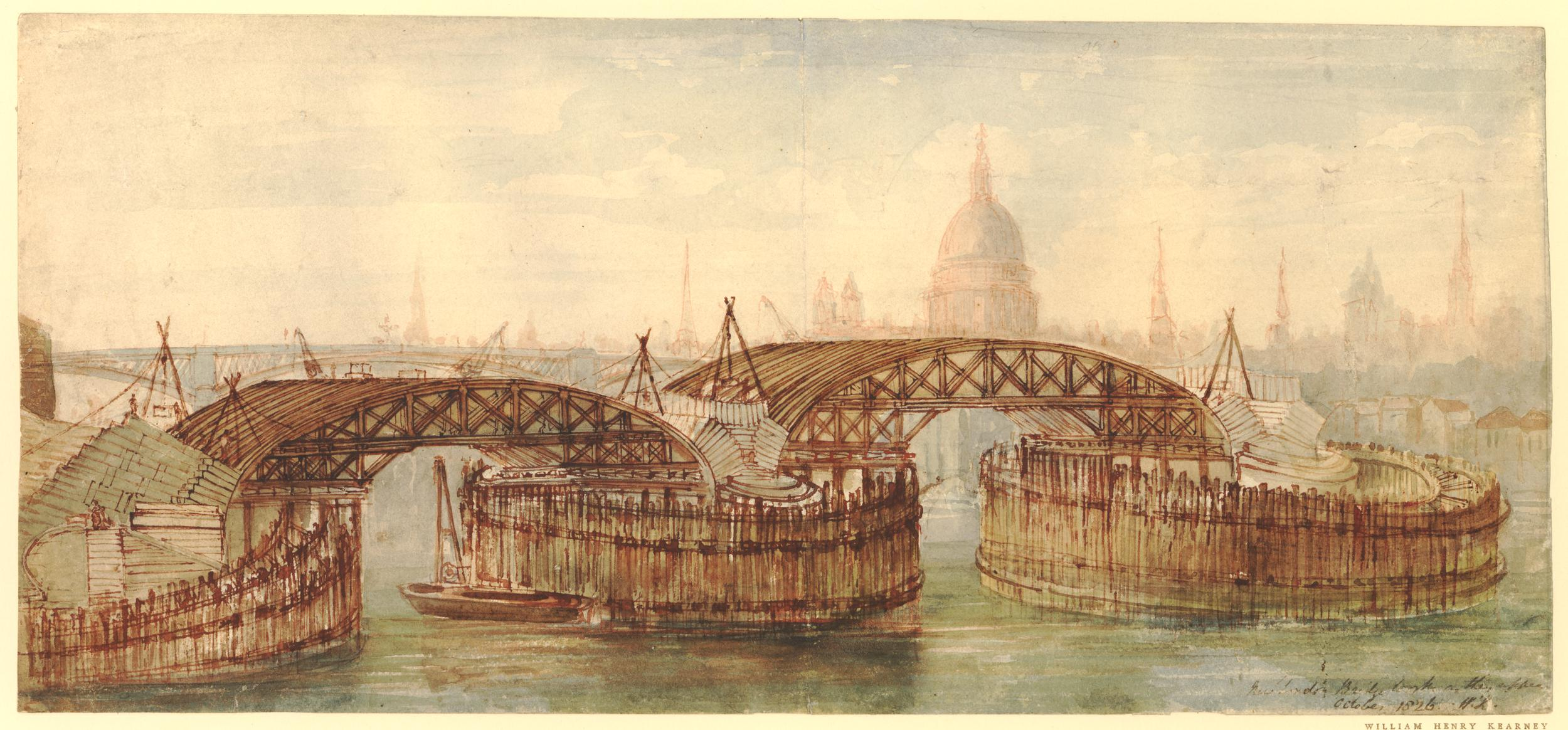
New London Bridge under construction, by William Henry Kearney, 1826

In 1799, a competition was opened to design a replacement for the medieval bridge. Entrants included Thomas Telford; he proposed a single iron arch span of 600 feet (180 m), with 65 feet (20 m) centre clearance beneath it for masted river traffic. His design was accepted as safe and practicable, following expert testimony. Preliminary surveys and works were begun, but Telford's design required exceptionally wide approaches and the extensive use of multiple, steeply inclined planes, which would have required the purchase and demolition of valuable adjacent properties.

A more conventional design of five stone arches, by John Rennie, was chosen instead. It was built 100 feet (30 m) west (upstream) of the original site by Jolliffe and Banks of Merstham, Surrey, under the supervision of Rennie's son. Work began in 1824 and the foundation stone was laid, in the southern coffer dam, on 15 June 1825.

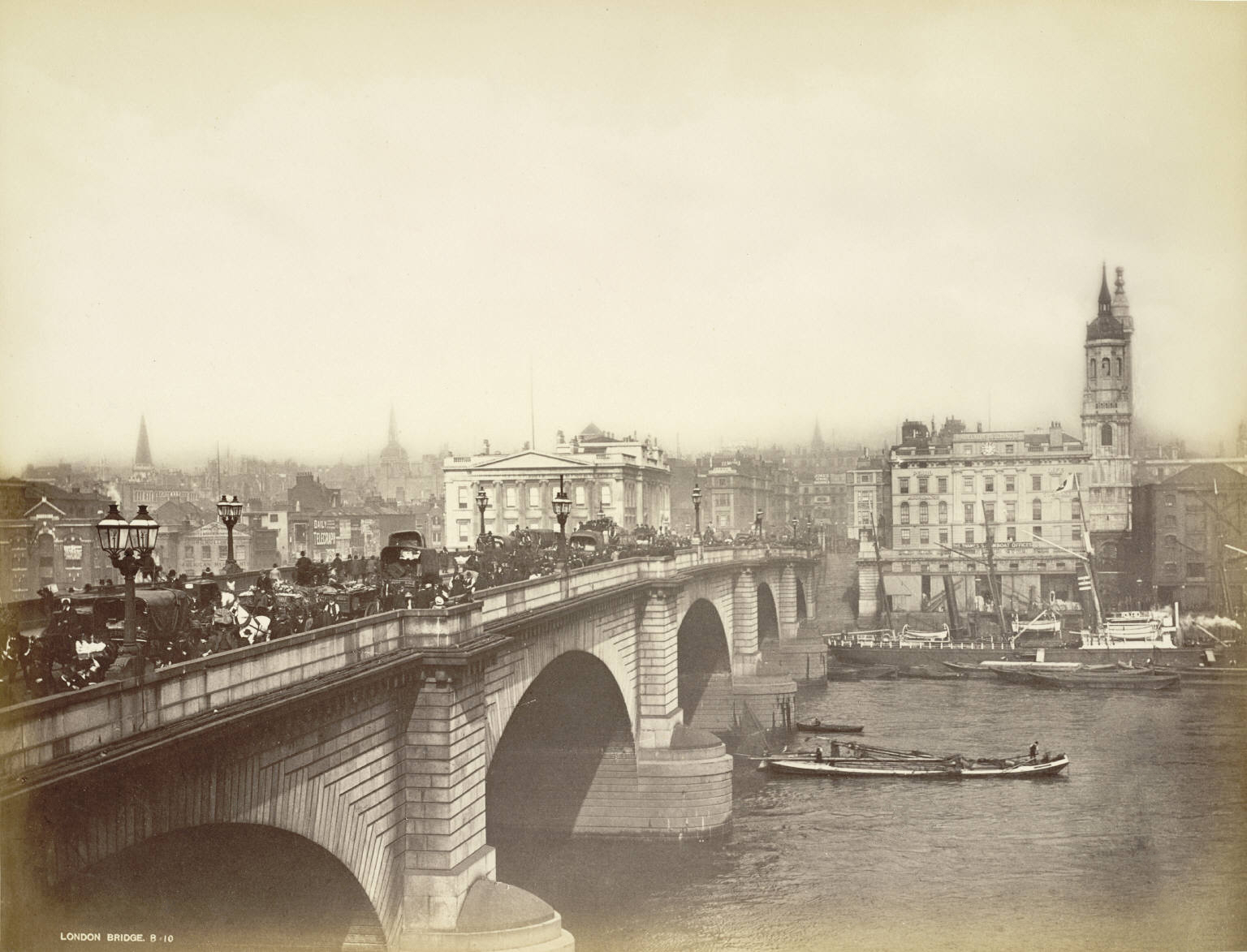
New London Bridge, c. 1870–1890

The old bridge continued in use while the new bridge was being built, and was demolished after the latter opened in 1831. New approach roads had to be built, which cost three times as much as the bridge itself. The total costs, around £2.5 million (£224 million in 2025), were shared by the British Government and the Corporation of London.

Rennie's bridge was 928 feet (283 m) long and 49 feet (15 m) wide, constructed from Haytor granite. The official opening took place on 1 August 1831; King William IV and Queen Adelaide attended a banquet in a pavilion erected on the bridge. The northern approach road, King William Street, was renamed after the monarch and a statue of the king subsequently installed.

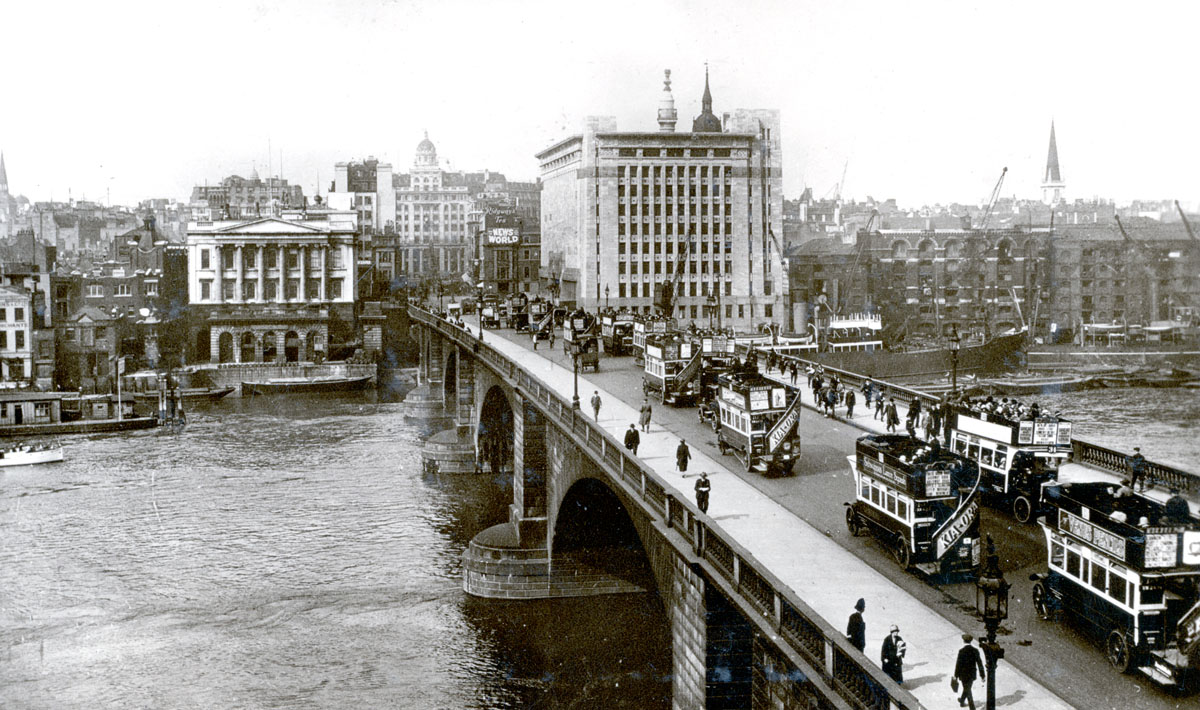
New London Bridge in 1927

In 1896 the bridge was the busiest point in London, and one of its most congested; 8,000 pedestrians and 900 vehicles crossed every hour. To designs by engineer Edward Cruttwell, it was widened by 13 feet (4.0 m), using granite corbels. Subsequent surveys showed that the bridge was sinking an inch (about 2.5 cm) every eight years, and by 1924 the east side had sunk some three to four inches (about 9 cm) lower than the west side. The bridge would have to be removed and replaced.

==== Sale to Robert McCulloch ====
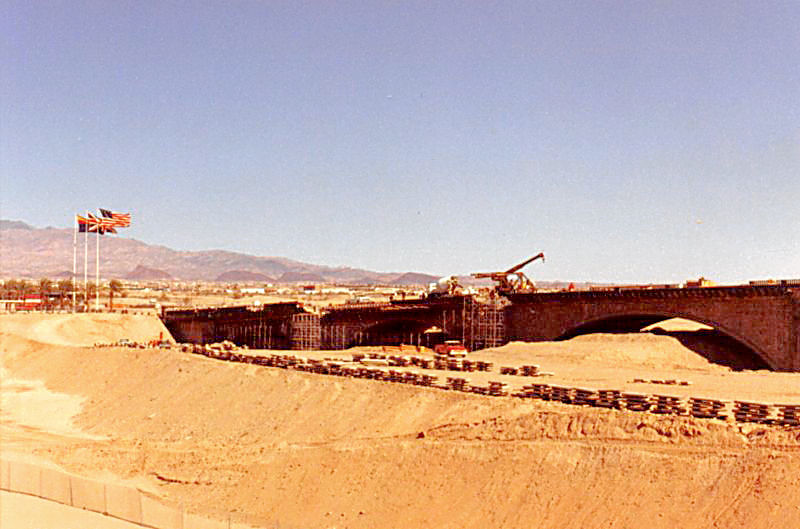
Rennie's New London Bridge during its reconstruction at Lake Havasu City, Arizona, March 1971

Common Council of the City of London member Ivan Luckin put forward the idea of selling the bridge, and recalled: "They all thought I was completely crazy when I suggested we should sell London Bridge when it needed replacing." Subsequently, in 1968, Council placed the bridge on the market and began to look for potential buyers. On 18 April 1968, Rennie's bridge was purchased by the Missourian entrepreneur Robert P. McCulloch of McCulloch Oil for US$2,460,000. The claim that McCulloch believed mistakenly that he was buying the more impressive Tower Bridge was denied by Luckin in a newspaper interview. Before the bridge was taken apart, each granite facing block was marked for later reassembly.

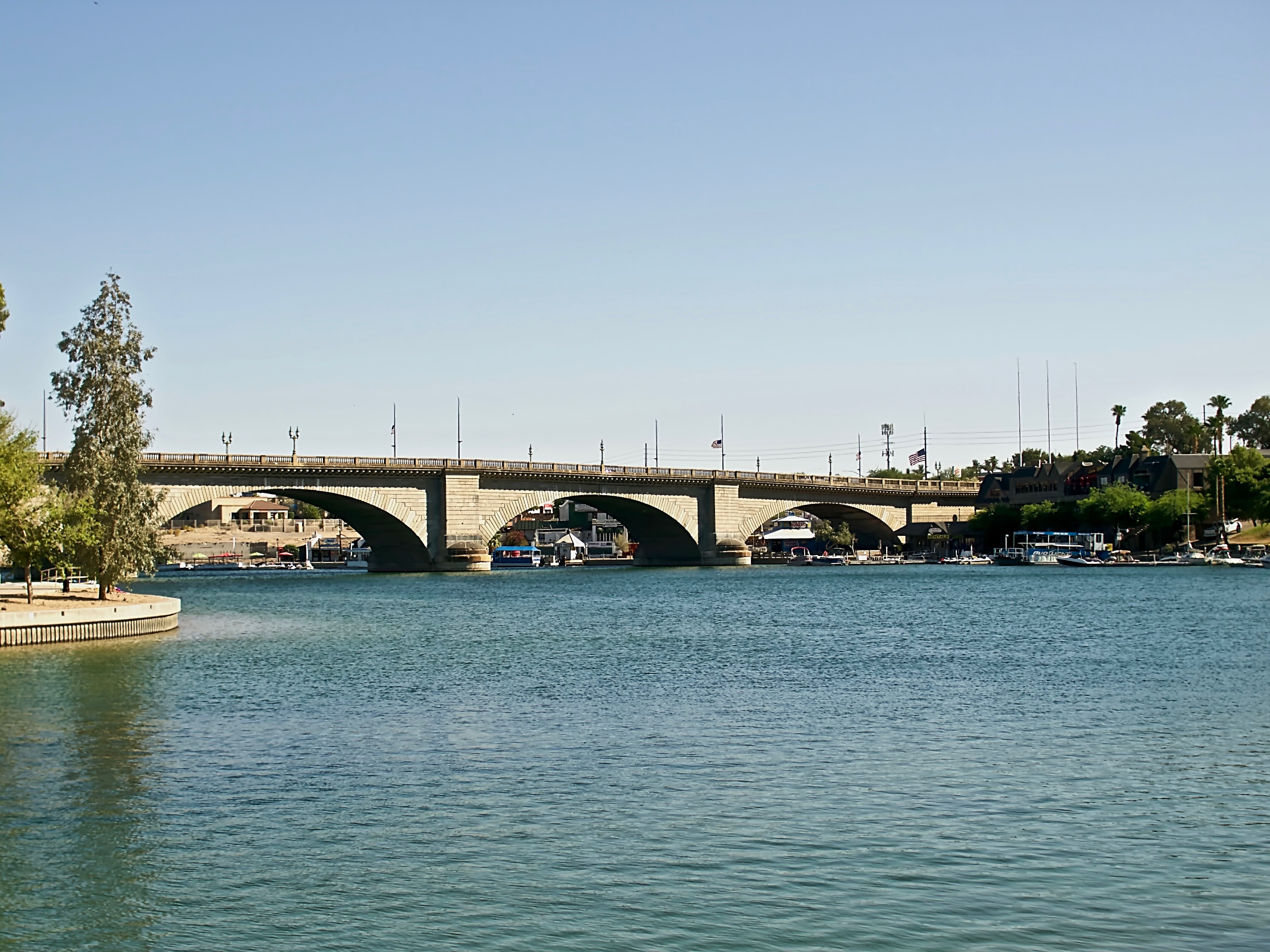
Rennie's New London Bridge rebuilt, Lake Havasu City, 2016

The blocks were taken to Merrivale Quarry at Princetown in Devon, where 15 to 20 cm (6 to 8 in) were sliced off the inner faces of many, to facilitate their fixing. (Stones left behind were sold in an online auction when the quarry was abandoned and flooded in 2003.) 10,000 tons of granite blocks were shipped via the Panama Canal to California, then trucked from Long Beach to Arizona. They were used to face a new, purpose-built hollow core steel-reinforced concrete structure, ensuring the bridge would support the weight of modern traffic. The bridge was reconstructed by Sundt Construction at Lake Havasu City, Arizona, and was re-dedicated on 10 October 1971 in a ceremony attended by London's Lord Mayor and celebrities. The bridge carries McCulloch Boulevard and spans the Bridgewater Channel, an artificial, navigable waterway that leads from the Uptown area of Lake Havasu City.

=== Modern London Bridge (1973–present) ===
London Bridge Act 1967
- Act of Parliament
- Parliament of the United Kingdom
- Long title: An Act to empower the Corporation of London to reconstruct London Bridge, to construct other works and to acquire lands compulsorily; and for other purposes.
- Citation: 1967 c. i
- Territorial extent: United Kingdom

Dates
- Royal assent: 16 February 1967
- Commencement: 16 February 1967 (Note: The Acts of Parliament (Commencement) Act 1793.)

Status: Current legislation

Text of statute as originally enacted

The current London Bridge was designed by architect Lord Holford and engineers Mott, Hay and Anderson. It was constructed by contractors John Mowlem and Co from 1967 to 1972, and opened by Queen Elizabeth II on 16 March 1973. It comprises three spans of prestressed-concrete box girders, a total of 833 feet (254 m) long. Structurally, the central span is a cantilever bridge, comprising a central suspended section between the cantilevered ends of the box girders over the side spans. (Note: Two expansion joints are visible in the roadway of the central section and vertical breaks in the sides of the bridge are visible from the river.) The cost of £4 million (£50.6 million in 2025), was met entirely by the Bridge House Estates charity. The current bridge was built in the same location as Rennie's bridge, with the previous bridge remaining in use while the first two girders were constructed upstream and downstream. Traffic was then transferred onto the two new girders, and the previous bridge demolished to allow the final two central girders to be added.

In 1984, the British warship HMS Jupiter collided with London Bridge, causing significant damage to both the ship and the bridge.

On Remembrance Day 2004, several bridges in London were furnished with red lighting as part of a night-time flight along the river by wartime aircraft. London Bridge was the one bridge not subsequently stripped of the illuminations, which are regularly switched on at night.

The current London Bridge is often shown in films, news and documentaries showing the throng of commuters journeying to work into the City from London Bridge Station (south to north). An example of this is actor Hugh Grant crossing the bridge north to south during the morning rush hour, in the 2002 film About a Boy.

On 11 July 2008, as part of the annual Lord Mayor's charity appeal and to mark the 800th anniversary of Old London Bridge's completion in the reign of King John, the Lord Mayor and Freemen of the City drove a flock of sheep across the bridge, supposedly by ancient rite.

On 3 June 2017, three pedestrians were killed by a van in a terrorist attack. Altogether, eight people died and 48 were injured in the attack. Security barriers were installed on the bridge to help isolate the pedestrian pavement from the road.

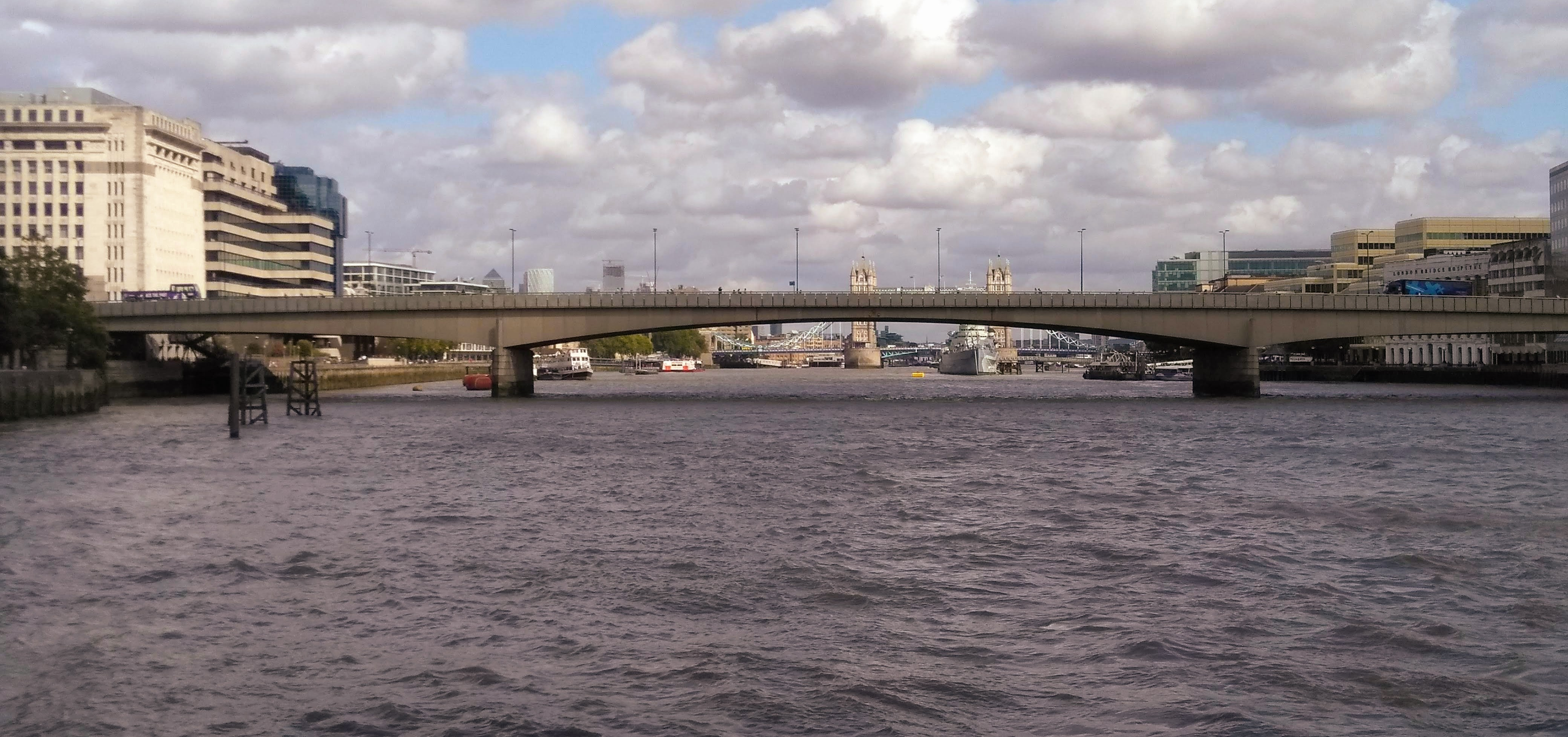
View of London Bridge from a boat passing under Cannon Street Railway Bridge

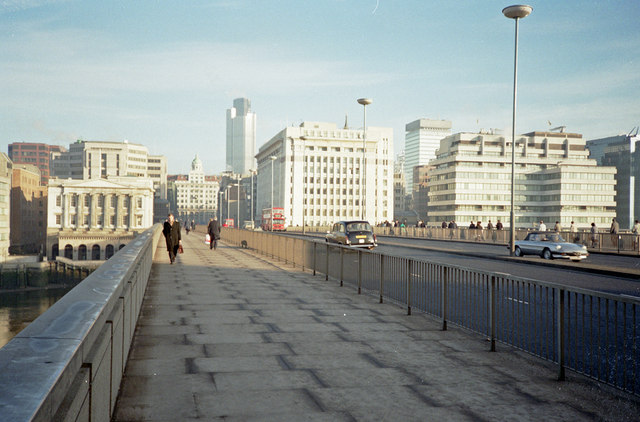
The current London Bridge in January 1987, with the National Westminster Tower skyscraper (Tower 42) opened six years earlier in the background

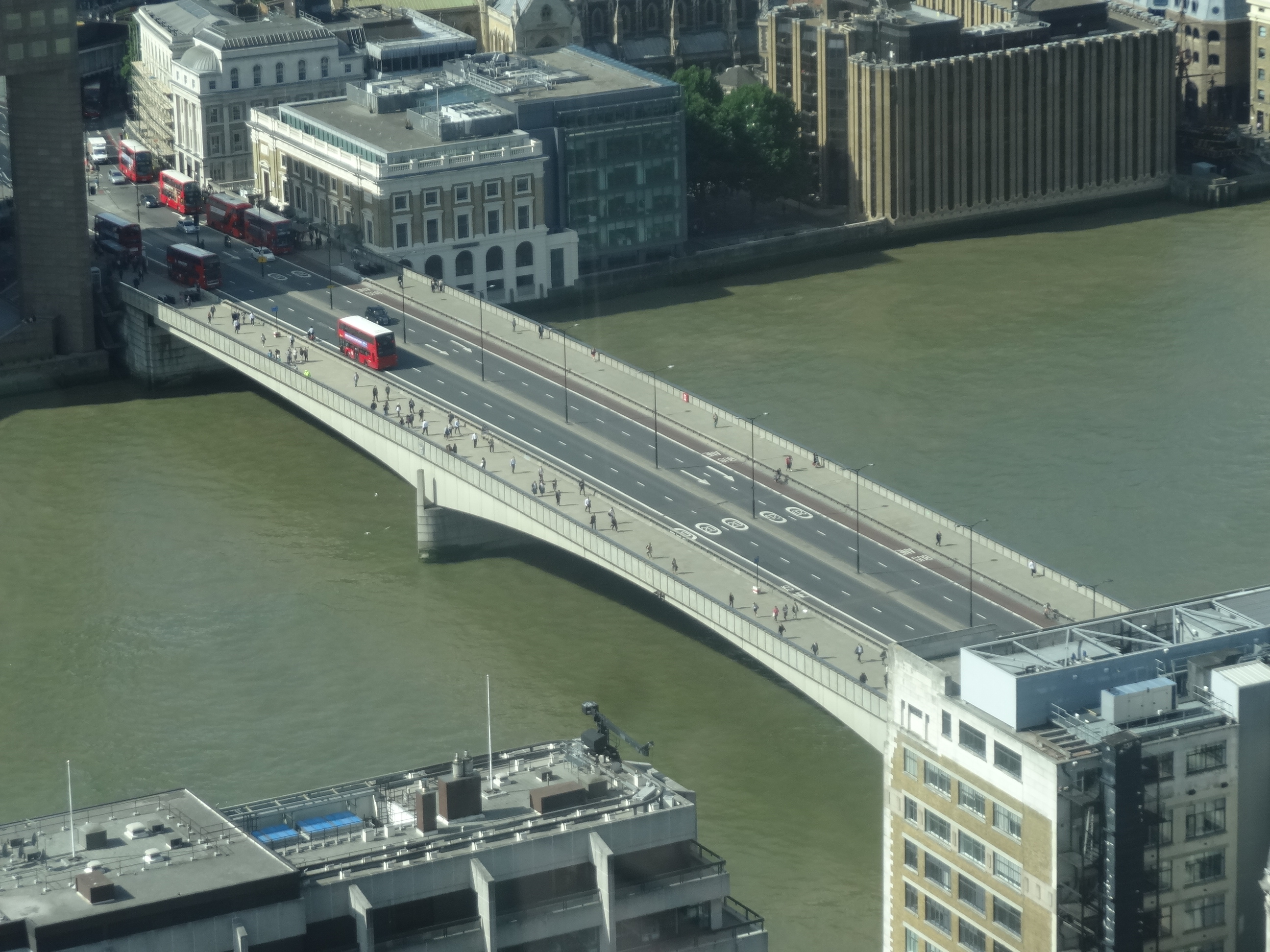
London Bridge from 20 Fenchurch Street

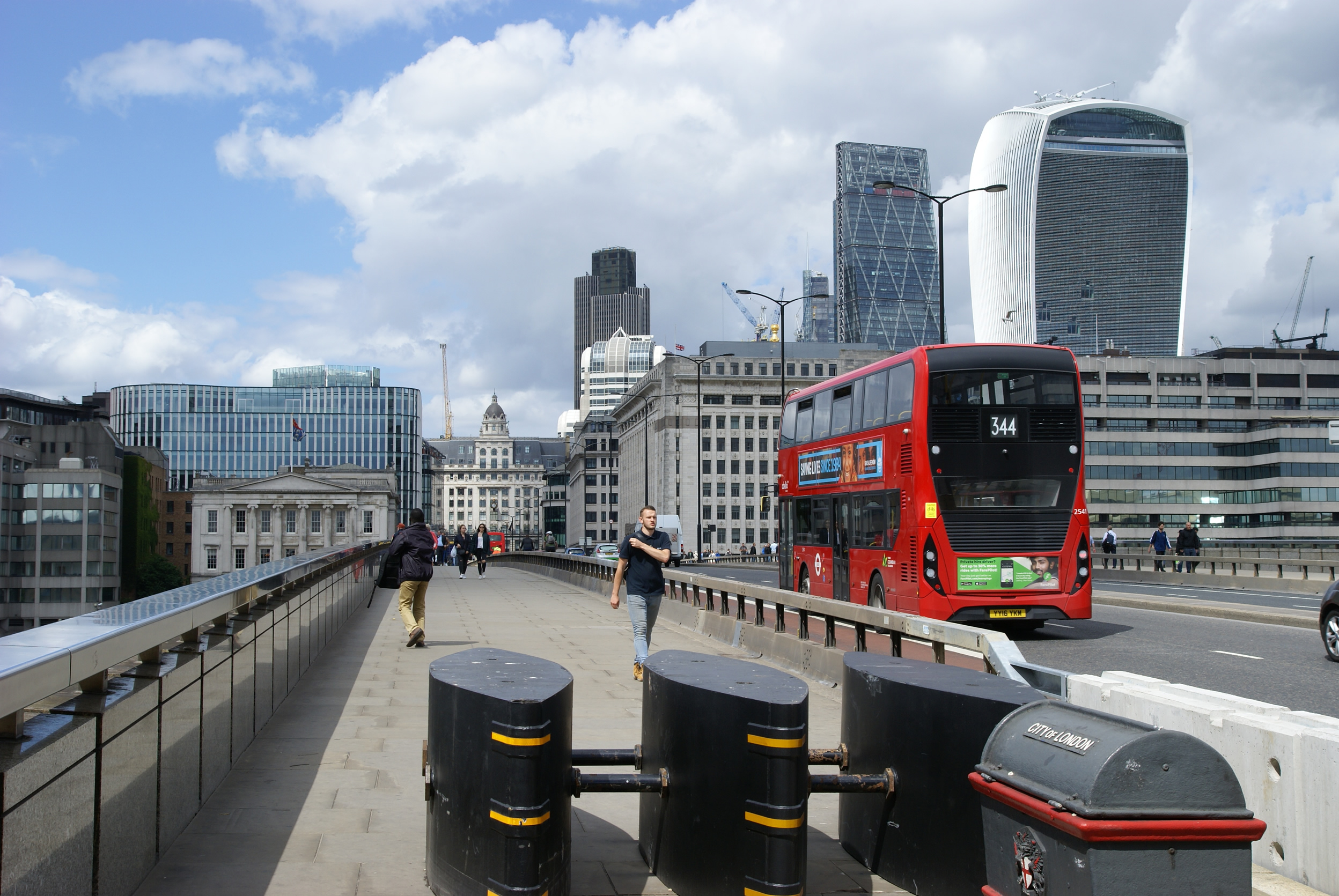
London Bridge with 2017 security barriers and the bulbous Walkie-Talkie building at right

== Transport ==
The nearest London Underground stations are Monument, at the northern end of the bridge, and London Bridge at the southern end. London Bridge station is also served by National Rail.

== In literature and popular culture ==
- The nursery rhyme and folk song "London Bridge Is Falling Down" has been speculatively connected to several of the bridge's historic collapses.
- The 1993 Joel Schumacher film Falling Down had characters interacting in different ways in regards to humming, singing, playing and listening to the nursery rhyme 'London Bridge Is Falling Down' throughout the movie. Also, the dialogue in scene in the restaurant between the characters Martin Prendergast (Robert Duvall) and Sandra Torres (Rachel Tocotin) talk about Prendergast retiring and moving to Lake Havasu, where the previous London Bridge now stands.
- Rennie's New London Bridge is a prominent landmark in T. S. Eliot's poem The Waste Land, wherein he compares the shuffling commuters across London Bridge to the hell-bound souls of Dante's Inferno. Also in that poem is a reference to the "inexplicable splendour of Ionian white and gold" of the church of St Magnus-the-Martyr, designed by Sir Christopher Wren, which marks the northern approach to the bridge, and the poem also ends with the lines "I sat upon the shore/fishing, with the arid plain behind me./Shall I at least set my lands in order?/London bridge is falling down, falling down, falling down".
- In Charles Dickens' Sketches by Boz, in the story entitled Scotland-yard there is much discussion by coal-heavers on the replacement of London Bridge in 1832, including a portent that the event will dry up the Thames.
- Gary P. Nunn's song "London Homesick Blues" includes the lyrics, "Even London Bridge has fallen down, and moved to Arizona, now I know why."
- English composer Eric Coates wrote a march about London Bridge in 1934.
- London Bridge is named in the World War II song "The King is Still in London" by Roma Campbell-Hunter & Hugh Charles.
- Fergie released a song titled "London Bridge" in 2006 as the lead single of her first solo album, The Dutchess. The music video for the track features the singer on a boat near London's Tower Bridge, which, despite the song's title, is not London Bridge. The song peaked at number one on Billboard's Hot 100 chart.

== See also ==
- Tower Bridge
- List of Roman bridges
- Roman bridge
- List of crossings of the River Thames
- List of bridges in London

== Bibliography ==
- Gerhold, Dorian, London Bridge and its Houses, c.1209-1761, London Topographical Society, 2019, ISBN 978-17-89257-51-9; 2nd edition, Oxbow Books, 2021, ISBN 1-789257-51-4.
- Home, Gordon, Old London Bridge, John Lane the Bodley Head Limited, 1931.
- Jackson, Peter, London Bridge – A Visual History, Historical Publications, revised edition, 2002, ISBN 0-948667-82-6.
- Murray, Peter & Stevens, Mary Anne, Living Bridges – The inhabited bridge, past, present and future, Royal Academy of Arts, London, 1996, ISBN 3-7913-1734-2.
- Pierce, Patricia, Old London Bridge – The Story of the Longest Inhabited Bridge in Europe, Headline Books, 2001, ISBN 0-7472-3493-0.
- Watson, Bruce, Brigham, Trevor and Dyson, Tony, London Bridge: 2000 years of a river crossing, Museum of London Archaeology Service, ISBN 1-901992-18-7.
- Yee, Albert, London Bridge – Progress Drawings, no publisher, 1974, ISBN 978-0-904742-04-6.
