= The Opening of New London Bridge =

Painting by Clarkson Stanfield

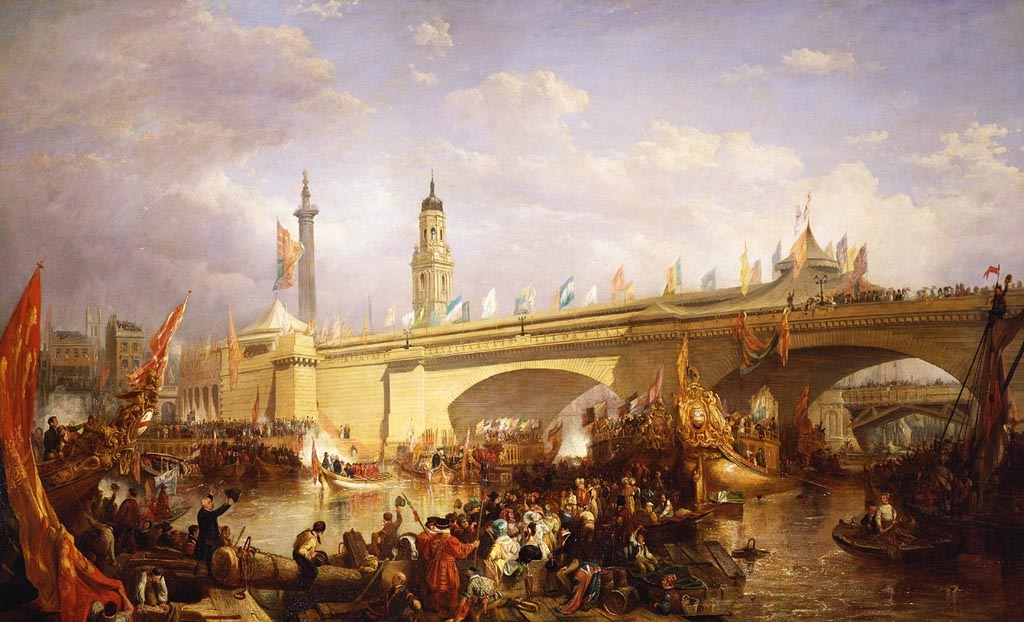
- Artist: Clarkson Stanfield
- Year: 1832
- Type: History painting
- Medium: Oil on canvas
- Dimensions: 152.1 cm × 244.8 cm (59.9 in × 96.4 in)
- Location: Royal Collection

The Opening of New London Bridge is an 1832 history painting by the British artist Clarkson Stanfield. It portrays the opening of New London Bridge on 1 August 1831 by King William IV. A new bridge to replace the medieval structure was designed John Rennie the Elder and partly overseen by his son John Rennie the Younger. The view is from the South Bank with The Monument and the tower of St Magnus seen on the north side. On the bridge itself is a pavilion erected for the ceremony where a banquet was held. The old bridge can be seen through the arches of the new one, shortly before it was demolished.

It was one of a pair of royal commissions Stanfield received around this time along with Portsmouth Harbour. It was exhibited at the Royal Academy's Summer Exhibition of 1832 at Somerset House. It remains in the Royal Collection today.

== See also ==
- The Opening of London Bridge, an 1832 work by George Jones
- The Opening of Waterloo Bridge, an 1832 work by John Constable

== Bibliography ==
- Herrmann, Luke. Nineteenth Century British Painting. Charles de la Mare, 2000.
- Millar, Oliver. The Victorian Pictures in the Collection of Her Majesty the Queen. Cambridge University Press, 1992.
- Smiles, Sam. Eye Witness: Artists and Visual Documentation in Britain 1770–1830. Routledge, 2018.
