= Abraham Hondius =

Dutch Golden Age painter

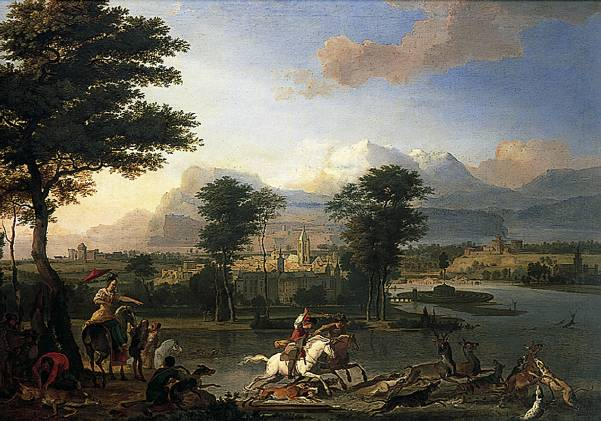
Abraham Hondius, The Stag Hunt , Norwich Castle, 1675

Abraham Danielsz. Hondius (about 1631 – 17 September 1691) was a Dutch Golden Age painter known for his depictions of animals.

== Career ==
Hondius was born in Rotterdam. He was the son of a city stonemason, Daniel Abramsz de Hondt. Hondius trained under Pieter de Bloot (1601–1658) and Cornelis Saftleven. He lived in Rotterdam until he moved to Amsterdam in 1659. He migrated to London in 1666, where he spent the rest of his life. Throughout his career, Hondius combined several stylistic influences and struggled to develop a style of his own. However, he specialized in animal pieces: more than two-thirds of his paintings, etchings and drawings are hunting scenes, animals fighting and animal studies. He also painted landscapes, genre and religious scenes. He also painted views of London such as The Frozen Thames and London Bridge. His last known work is Ape and Cat Fighting over Dead Poultry, dated 1690.

== Gallery ==
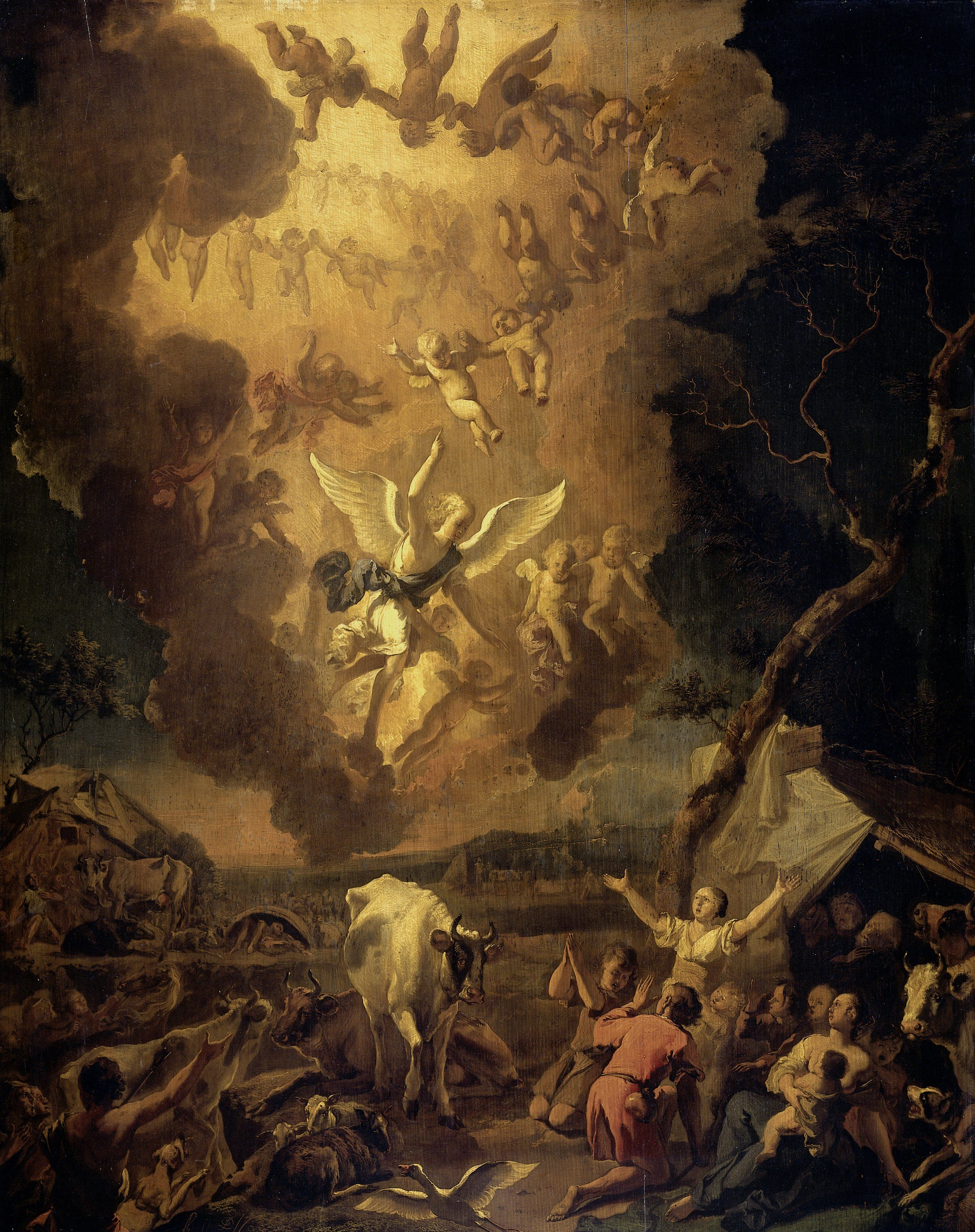
The Proclamation to the Shepherds, 1663, Rijksmuseum Amsterdam

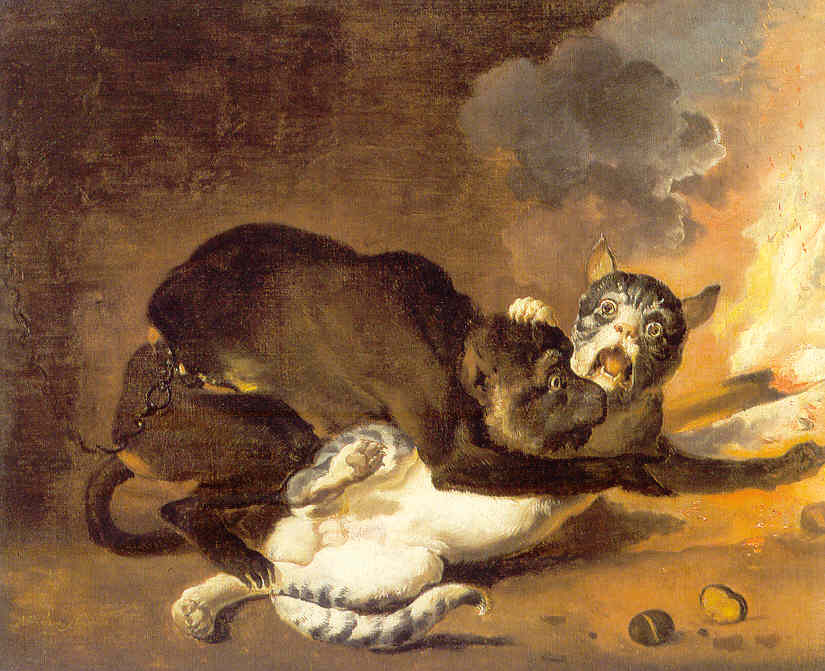
The Monkey and the Cat, 1670, Cleveland Museum of Art

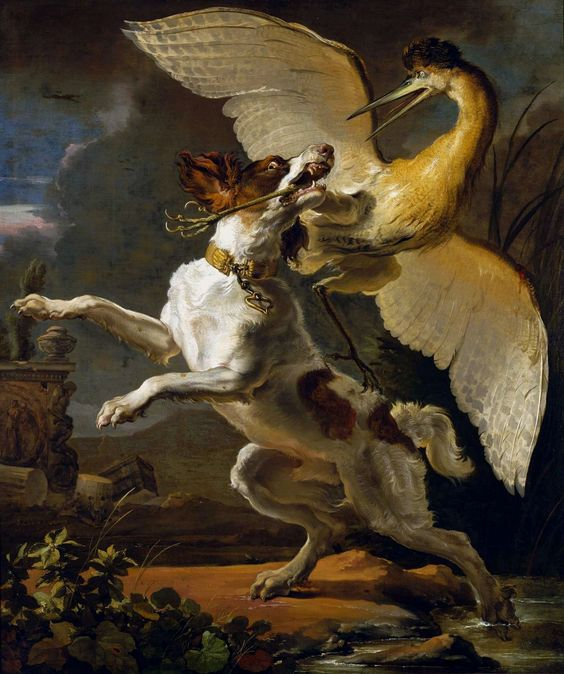
Fight between a dog and a heron, 1670, National Museum in Warsaw

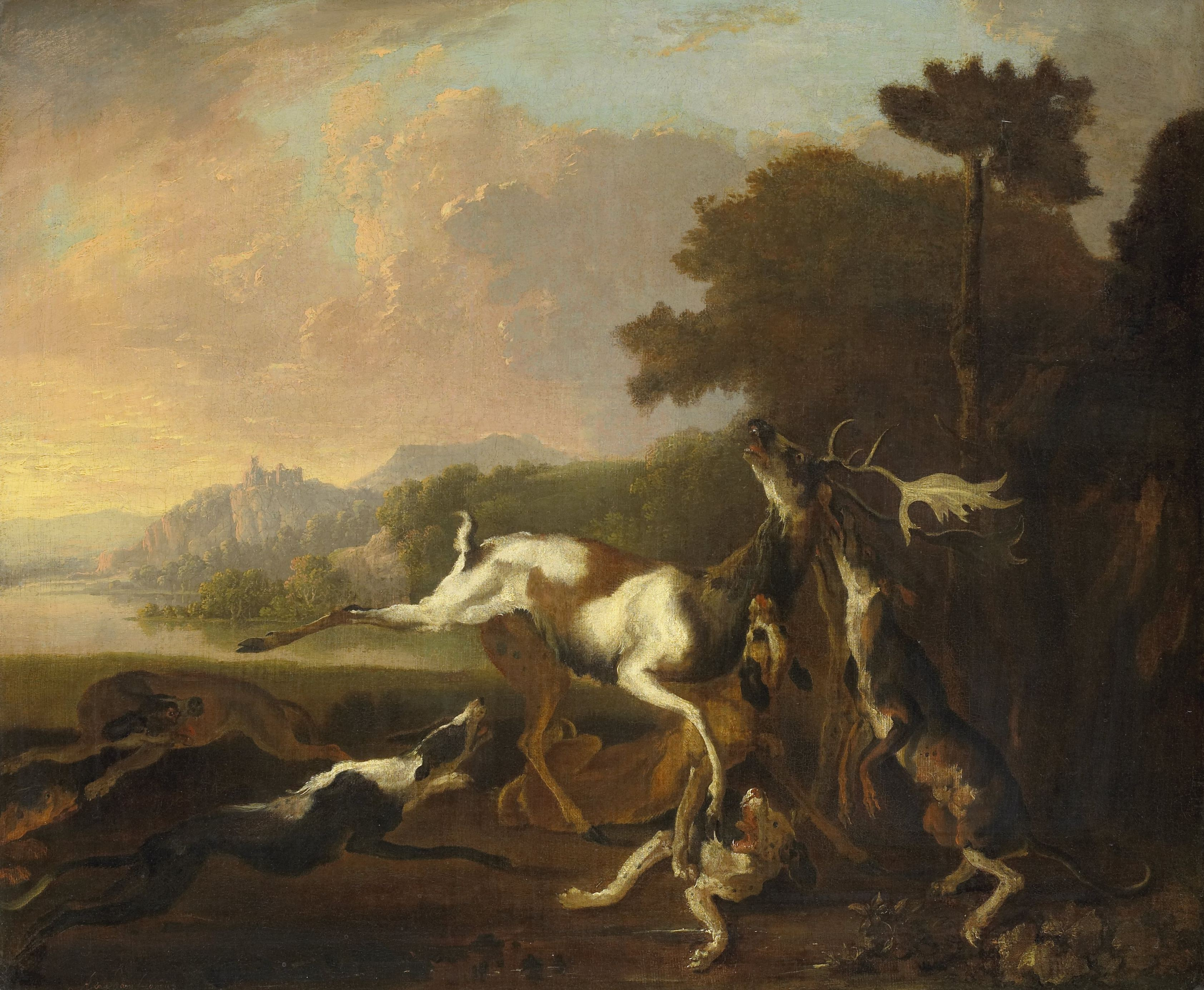
The Deer Hunt, Rijksmuseum

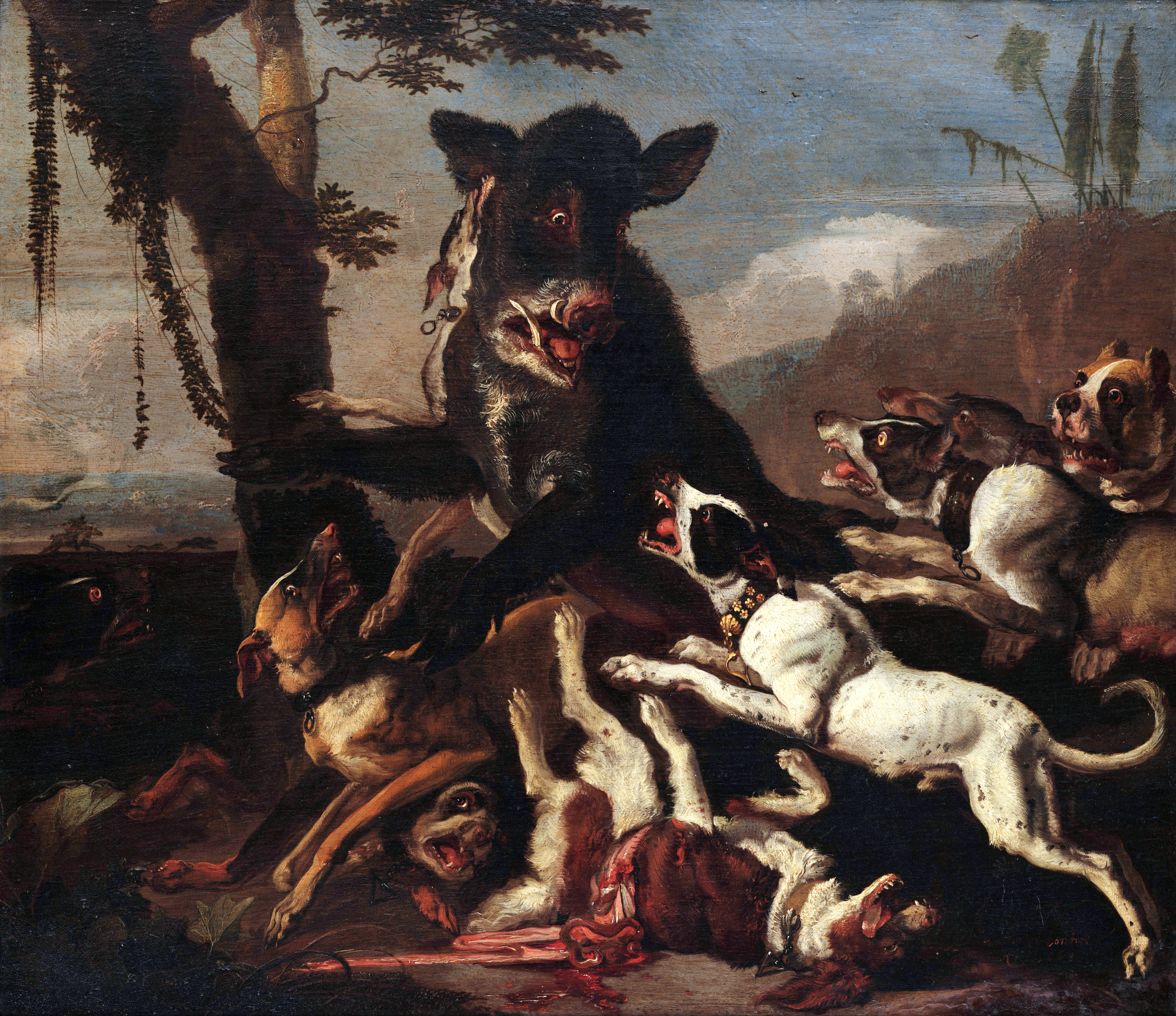
wild boar hunting, São Paulo

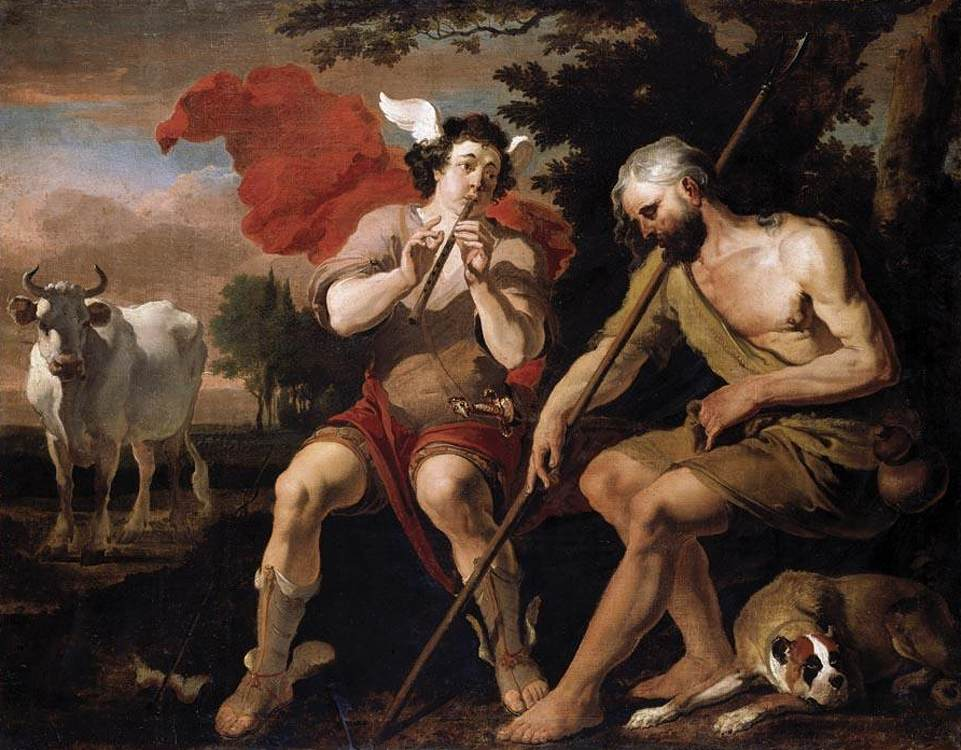
Mercury and Argos, private collection

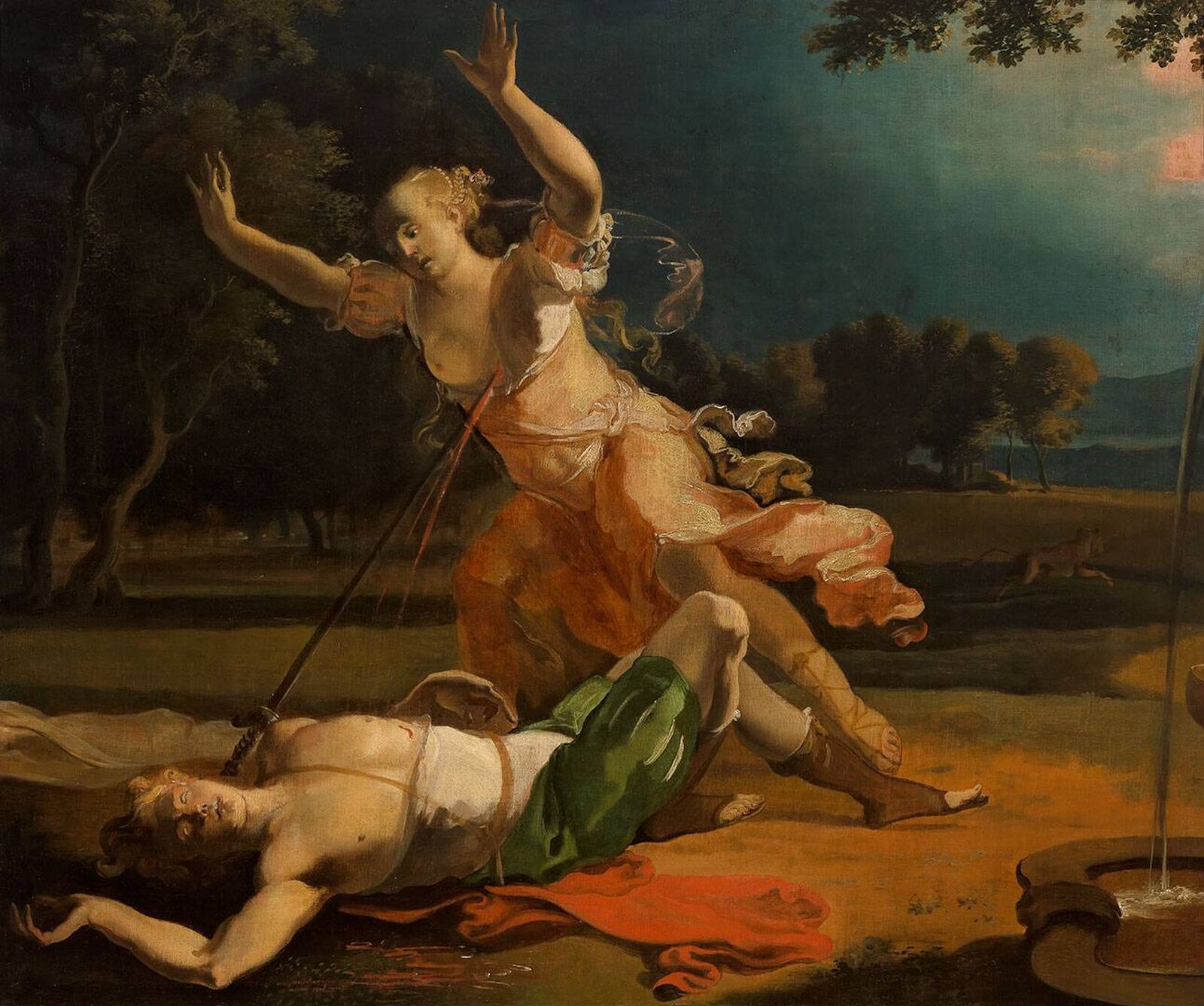
Pyramus and Thisbe, Museum Boijmans van Beuningen, Rotterdam

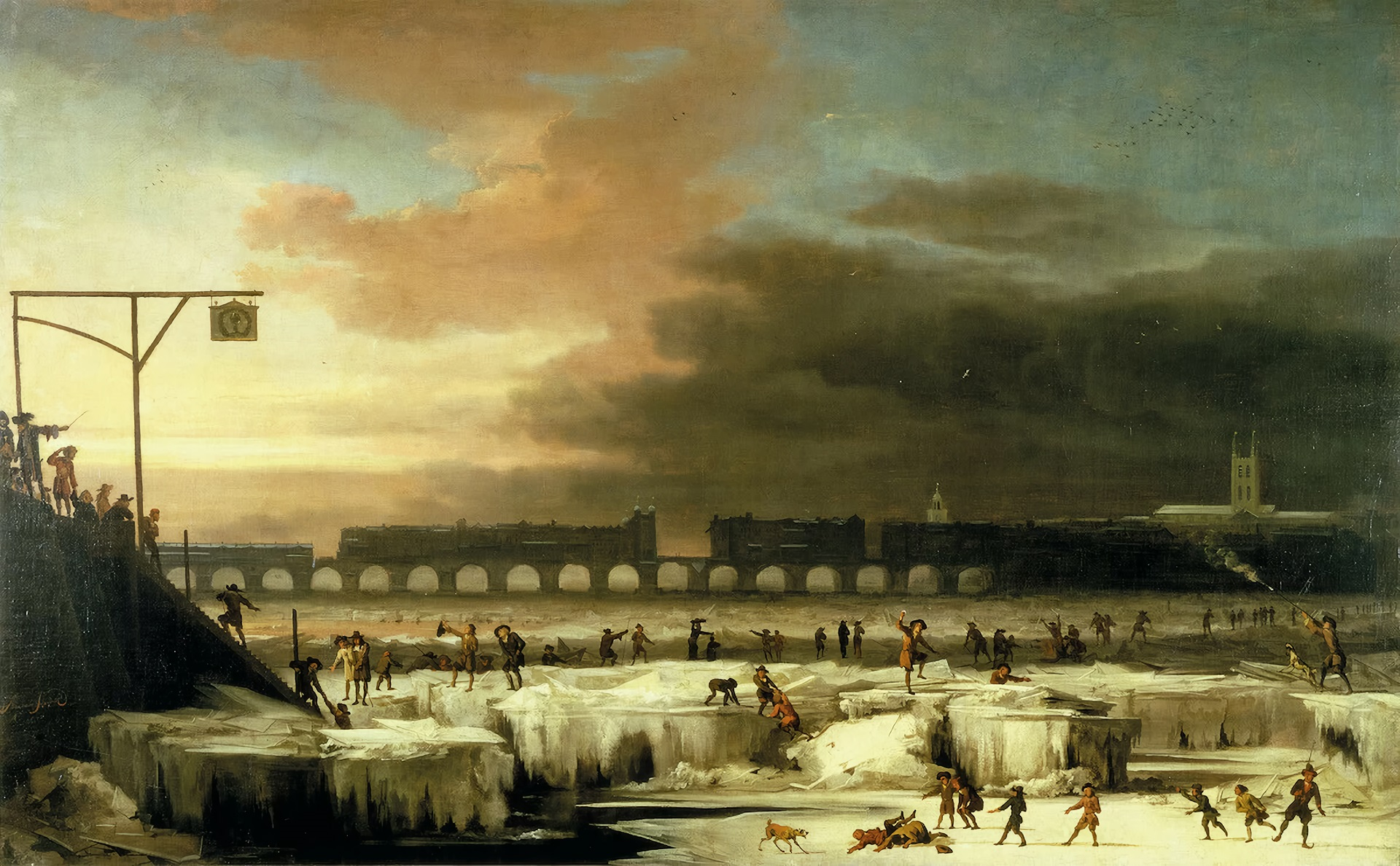
The Frozen Thames by Abraham Hondius in the Museum of London, showing Old London Bridge and what is now Southwark Cathedral in 1677.
