= The Frozen Thames =

Painting by Abraham Hondius

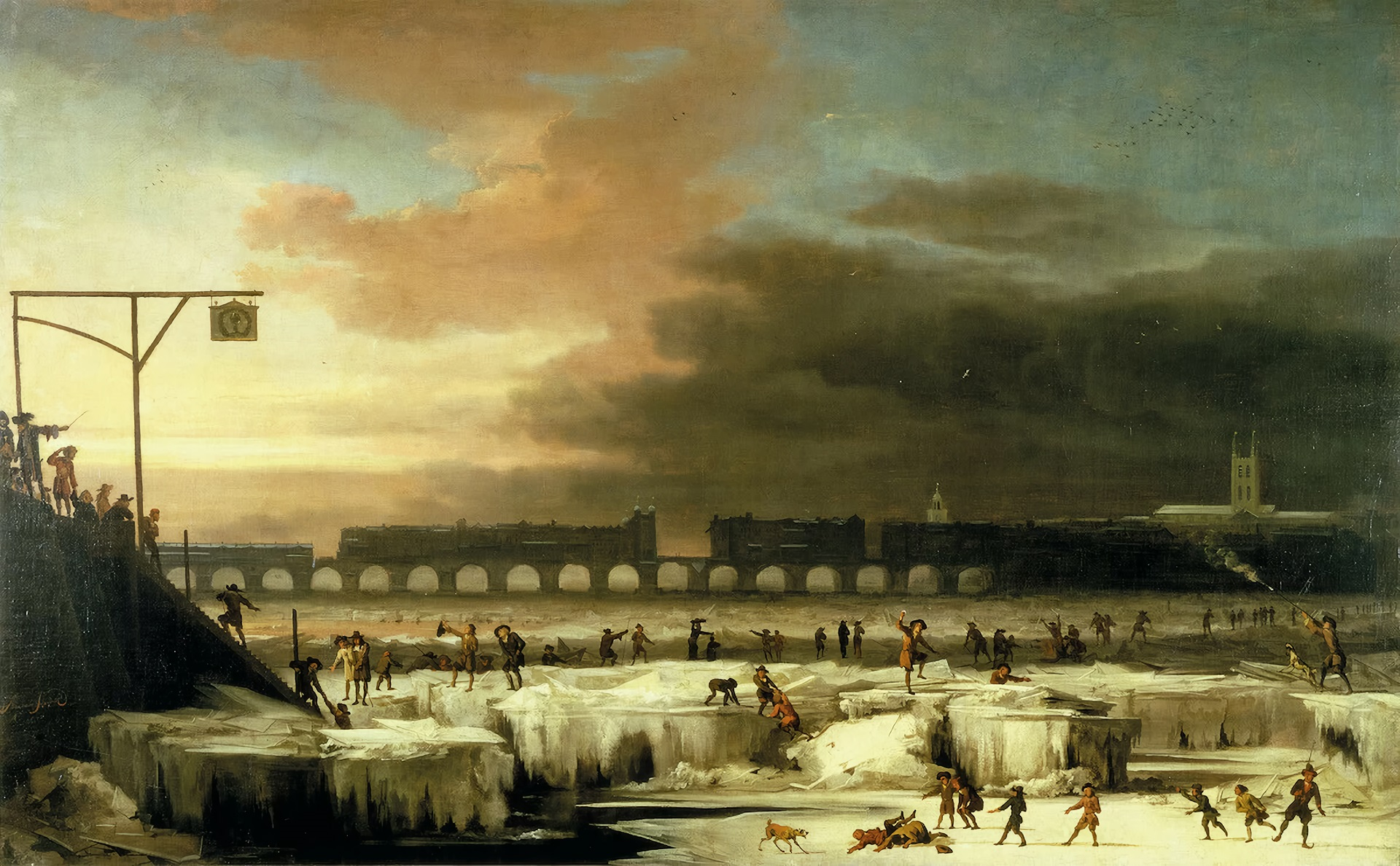
- Artist: Abraham Hondius
- Year: 1677
- Type: Oil on canvas, landscape painting
- Dimensions: 107.8 cm × 175.6 cm (42.4 in × 69.1 in)
- Location: London Museum; London

The Frozen Thames is a 1677 landscape painting by the Dutch artist Abraham Hondius. It depicts a view of the River Thames in London when it had frozen over in the winter of 1676. The painting looks eastwards towards Old London Bridge with buildings on it. Beyond it can be seen the tower of St Olave's Church and what is now Southwark Cathedral. As part of the Little Ice Age the Thames occasionally froze over and frost fairs were held.

Today it is in the collection of the London Museum, having been acquired in 1935.

== Bibliography ==
- Humphreys, Helen. The Frozen Thames. Aurum Press, 2012.
- Liedtke, Walter A. Dutch Paintings in the Metropolitan Museum of Art, Volume 1. Metropolitan Museum of Art, 2007.
- Thomas, Christopher, Chopping, Andy & Wellman, Tracy (ed.) London's Archaeological Secrets: A World City Revealed. Yale University Press, 2003.
