= William Henry Kearney =

Watercolour painter

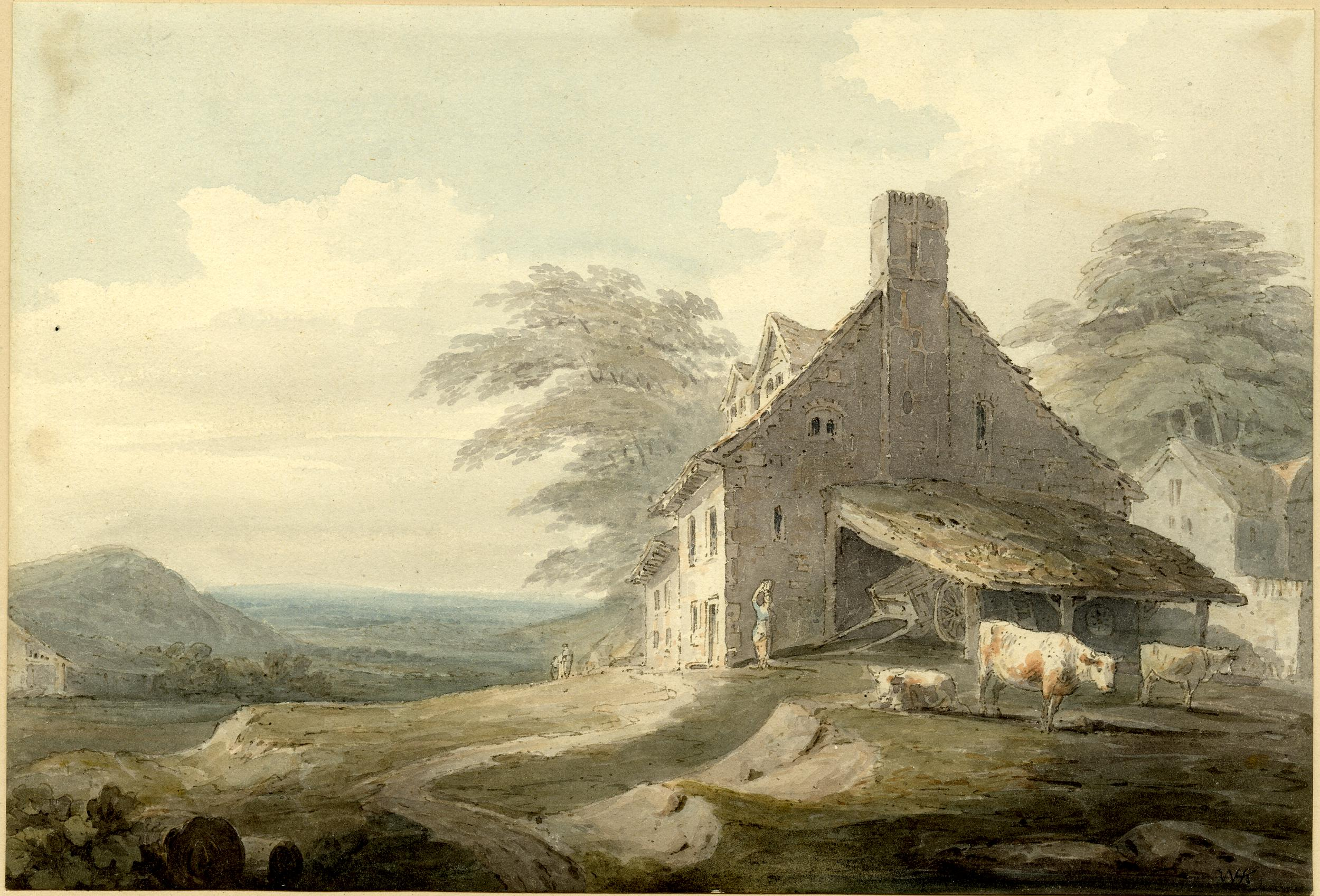
View of Dolgelly

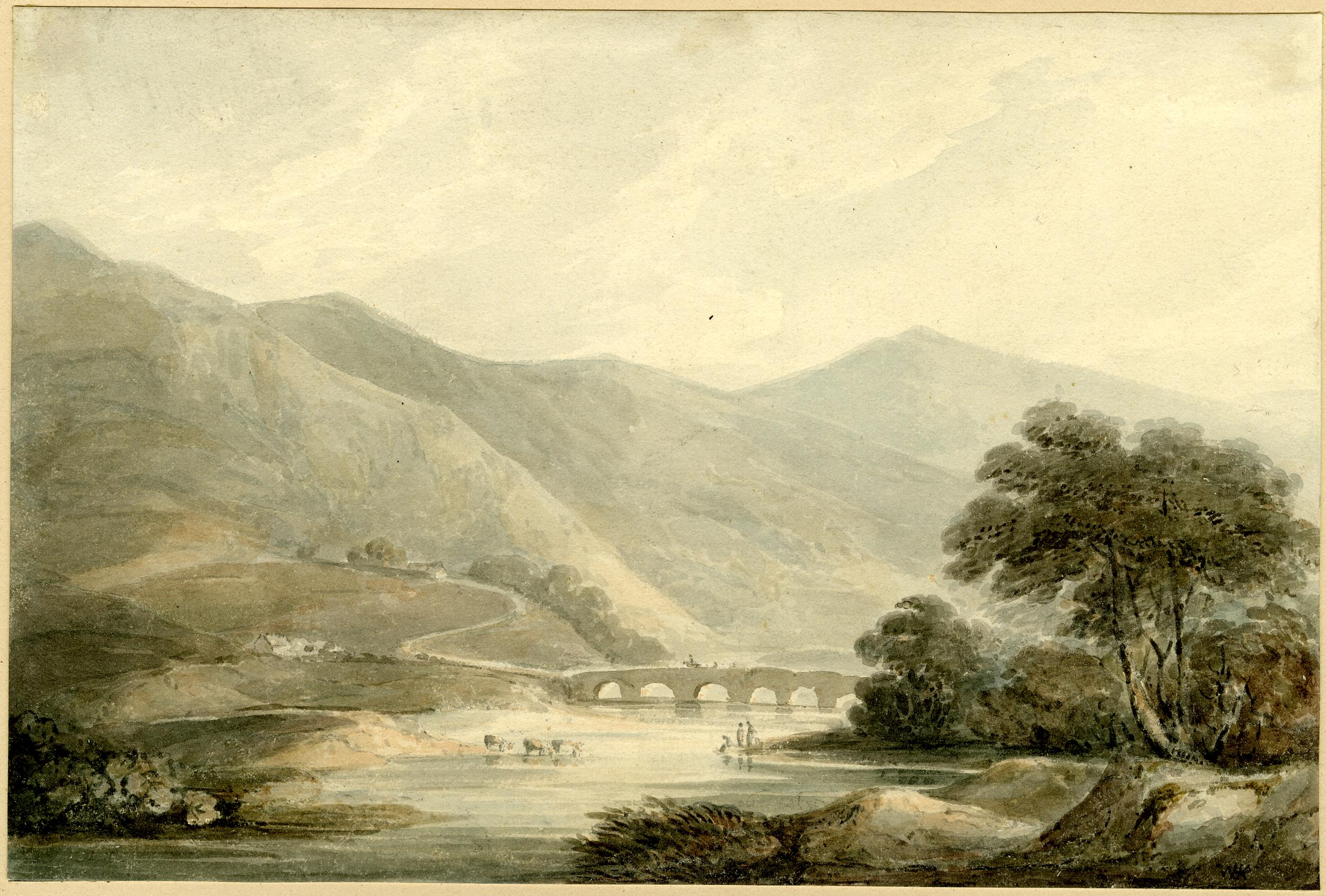
View of Abergavenny

William Henry Kearney, RI (c. 1800–1858) was an English water-colour painter of landscapes and figure subjects.

== Life ==
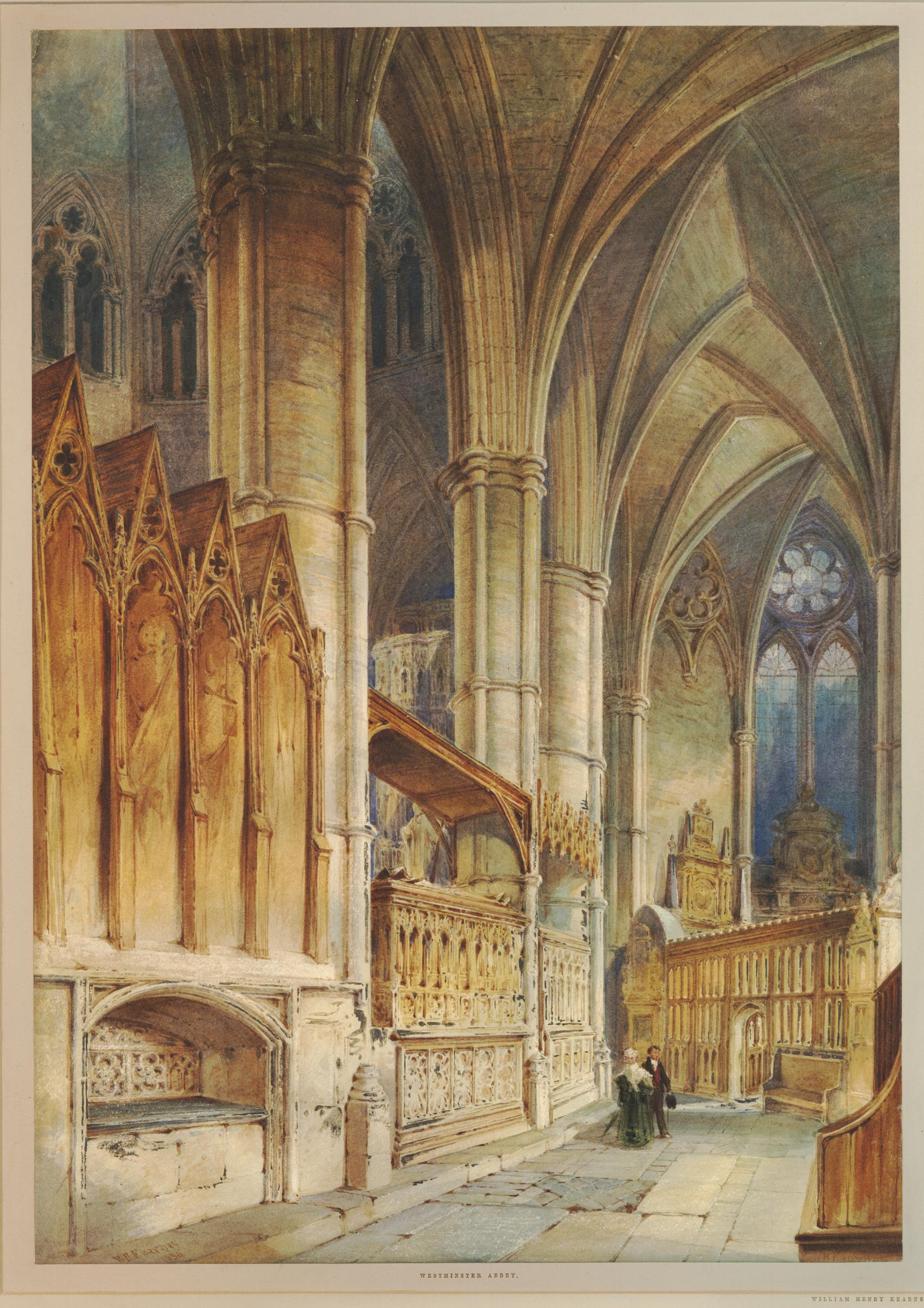
View in the south aisle of the choir of Westminster Abbey (1836)

William Henry Kearney, born in 1800 or 1801, was probably the child of that name, son of John and Eleanor Kerney, who was baptised at St Mary's, Rotherhithe, London, on 3 May 1801. He was admitted to the Royal Academy Schools on 18 November 1823 at the age of twenty-two.

He was one of the foundation members in 1831, and subsequently a vice-president of the New Society of Painters in Water Colours (later renamed the Institute of Painters in Water Colours). He exhibited at their first exhibition in 1834, and would go on to exhibit 170 pictures there. He had previously been an exhibitor at the Royal Academy, commencing in 1823. He exhibited nine times at the Royal Academy between 1823 and 1850.

Kearney died at his at his home, 114 High Holborn, London, on 25 June 1858, aged fifty-seven. He was survived by his wife, whose name may have been Hester.

== Works ==
Kearney worked in the early pure manner of water-colour painting, and his works have been highly valued. There are two fair examples, views in Wales, in the print room at the British Museum; another two are in the collections of the Victoria and Albert Museum.

Among his works were Love's Young Dream, Ruins of the Sally-port, Framlingham (now in the National Gallery of Ireland), and The Courtship of Quintin Matsys, and The Fatal Picture.

He published Illustrations of the Surrey Zoological Gardens (3 parts, 1832).
