= Young Anglers =

Painting by William Collins

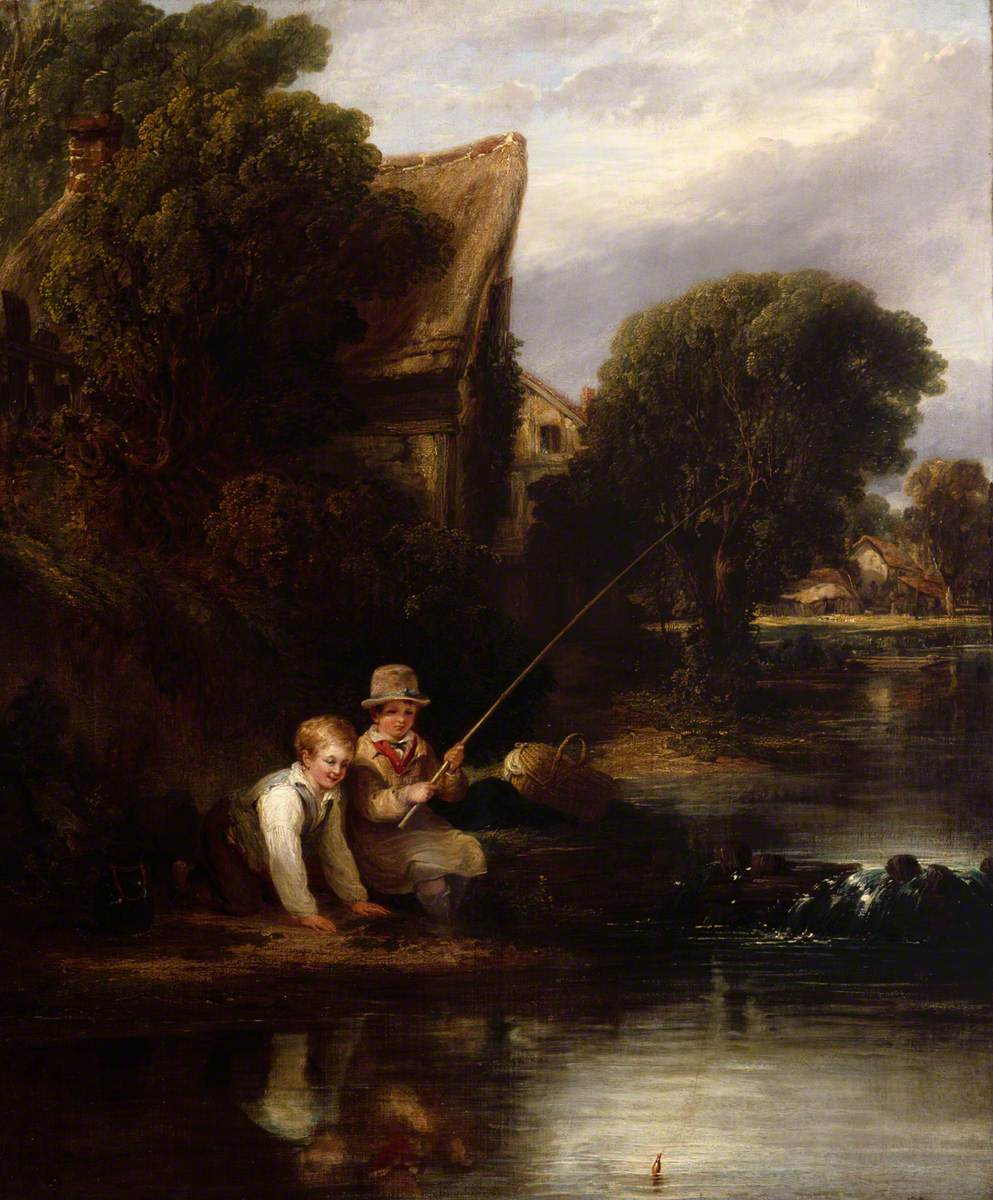
- Artist: William Collins
- Year: 1820
- Type: Oil on canvas, genre painting
- Dimensions: 106.4 cm × 93.7 cm (41.9 in × 36.9 in)
- Location: Royal Academy of Arts; London

Young Anglers is an 1820 oil painting by the British artist William Collins. It features a depiction in rural England, where two boys on the bank of a river in a village are happily fishing. Such nostalgic, Romantic views were common in the work of Collins.

When Collins was elected as a full member of the Royal Academy of Arts in 1820 he presented this as his diploma work. It remains in the collection of the Royal Academy today. The theme of boys fishing or collecting shrimps or prawns recurred in his work such as Shrimp Boys at Cromer or Prawn Fishing. The same year a mezzotint Boys Fishing was produced by the engraver Francis James Collins was produced based on Collins' work.

== Bibliography ==
- Grant, Maurice Harold. A Chronological History of the Old English Landscape Painters. University of California, 1926.
- Solkin, David H. Painting Out of the Ordinary: Modernity and the Art of Everyday Life in Early Nineteenth-century Britain. Yale University Press, 2009.
- Wood, Christopher Newall, Christopher & Richardson, Margaret. Victorian Painters. ACC Art Books, 1995.
