= The Stray Kitten =

Painting by William Collins

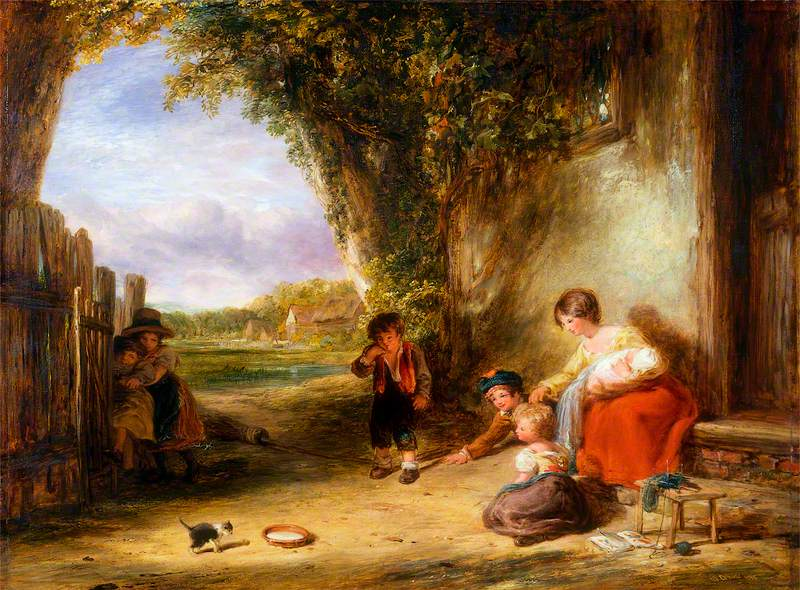
- Version in the Victoria and Albert Museum
- Artist: William Collins
- Year: 1835
- Type: Oil on panel, genre painting
- Dimensions: 45.7 cm × 61 cm (18.0 in × 24 in)
- Location: Victoria and Albert Museum, London

The Stray Kitten is an 1835 oil painting by the British artist William Collins. A genre painting, it depicts a scene outside a cottage in rural England where a group of children watch a stray kitten approaching a saucer of milk. This was a replica work by Collins based on his original painting that was displayed at the Royal Academy Exhibition of 1833 at Somerset House in London. The work was acquired by the art collector John Sheepshanks who in 1857 donated it to the Victoria and Albert Museum in South Kensington as part of the Sheepshanks Gift. The artist's son Wilkie Collins mentions the painting in his 1848 book Memoirs of the Life of William Collins.

== Bibliography ==
- Lambourne, Lionel. An Introduction to "Victorian" Genre Painting: From Wilkie to Frith. Victoria and Albert Museum, 1982.
- Redgrave, Richard. The Sheepshanks Gallery. Bell and Daldy, 1870.
- Roe, Sonia. Oil Paintings in Public Ownership in the Victoria and Albert Museum. Public Catalogue Foundation, 2008.
