= J. J. Hill =

J. J. Hill may refer to:

- James John Hill (1811–1882), English landscape and portrait painter
- James Jerome Hill (1838–1916), Canadian-American railroad executive
- John James Hill (1853–1932), English stonemason and builder in the United States

== See also ==
- J. Hill, American music arranger
- Hill (surname)#J
