= Prawn Fishing =

Painting by William Collins

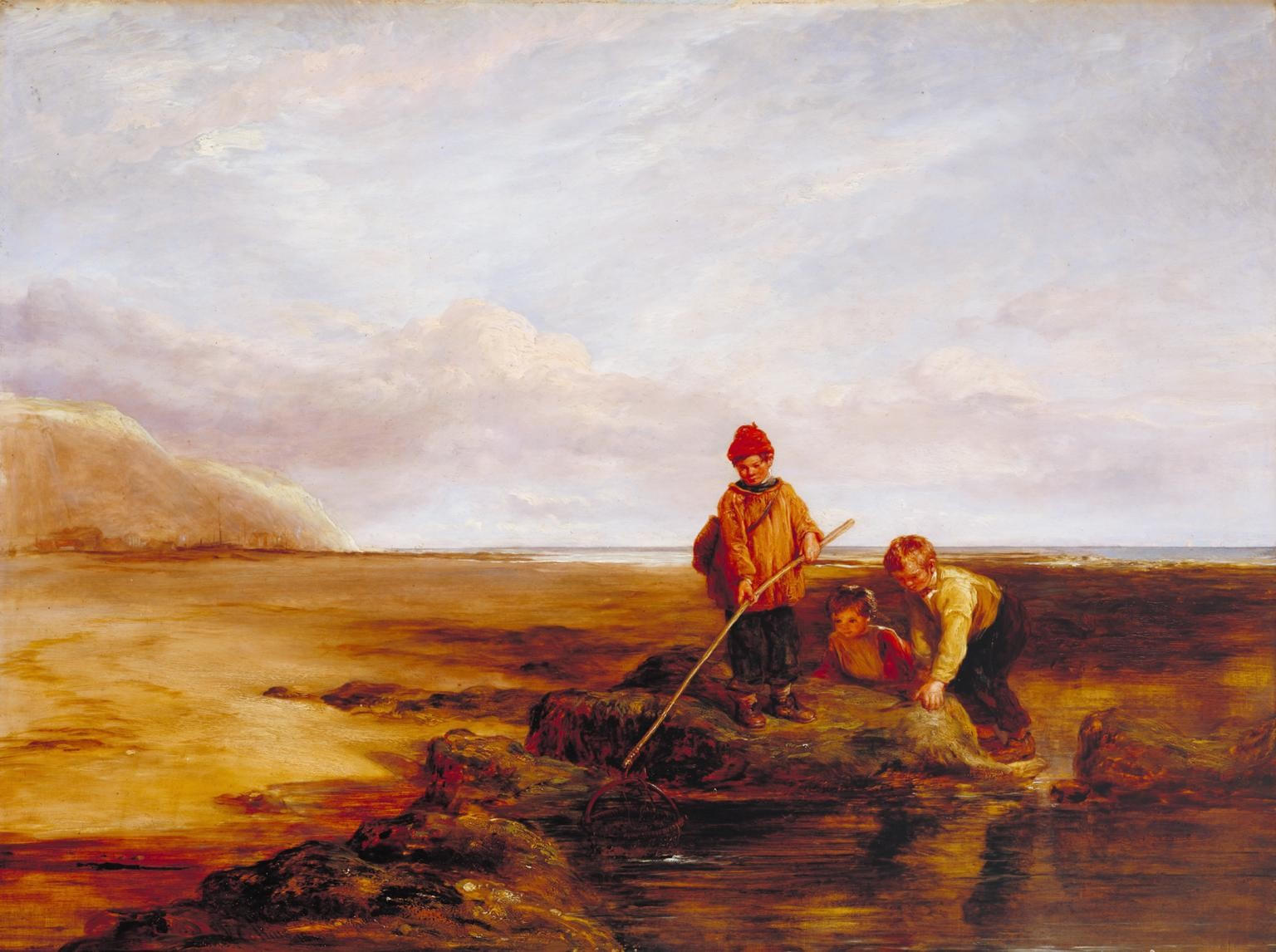
- Artist: William Collins
- Year: 1828
- Type: Oil on panel, genre painting
- Dimensions: 43.5 cm × 58.4 cm (17.1 in × 23.0 in)
- Location: Tate Britain, London

Prawn Fishing is an 1828 genre painting by the British artist William Collins. It depicts a group of boys on a beach at low tide looking for prawns. It was inspired by a visit he had made to the Isle of Wight in 1827. Much of the artist's work during the period was a romantic, idealised view of children playing of at work. An engraving was produced based on the picture by James Tibbits Willmore.

The painting was displayed at the Royal Academy Exhibition of 1829 led at Somerset House in London. It was acquired by the art collector Robert Vernon who in 1847 donated it to the National Gallery as part of the Vernon Gift. Today it is part of the collection of the Tate Britain in Pimlico. It is mention in the 1848 biography of him Memoirs of the Life of William Collins written by his son Wilkie Collins.

== Bibliography ==
- Herrmann, Luke. Nineteenth Century British Painting. Charles de la Mare, 2000.
