= James John Hill =

English painter

- 'Mother and Child,' by James John Hill, painted sometime in the mid 19th century
- Born: 1811; Broad Street, Birmingham, England
- Died: 27 January 1882 (aged 70–71); Highgate, London, England
- Other name: J. J. Hill
- Occupation: Artist

James John Hill RBA (1811 – 27 January 1882), known also by his alias J. J. Hill, was an English landscape and portrait painter, known for his many rustic paintings and portraits of Lady Burdett-Coutts.

== Early life and career ==
James John Hill was born sometime in 1811 in Broad Street, Birmingham to Daniel Hill, plater, and Elizabeth Rowlinson, the daughter of a brass founder. He was educated at Hazelwood School, a school founded by the educational reformer Rowland Hill (no relation), and he attended Joseph Barber's art academy in Great Charles Street, at the time being taught by his son Vincent. His fellow pupils included Thomas Creswick, James Tibbits Willmore, Thomas Baker, and Peter Hollins.

Having moved to London in 1839, Hill was elected in 1842 a member of the Society of British Artists. There, he became known as a 'popular contributor' among his fellow artists, showing off his artwork in a number of their exhibitions across the next forty years. He operated primarily in London, painting many portraits of Lady Burdett-Coutts, a Victorian philanthropist, and her many pets. He was allegedly a good friend of hers. His paintings were known to depict mainly girls and boys and their families residing in the countryside, nature being present in almost all of his artwork, and in his later career he moved from painting mainly portraits and people to painting landscapes. Most of his landscape paintings were inspired by his visit to Ireland in 1854. He found less success in painting landscapes than he did scenes of wildlife and people.

== Later career ==
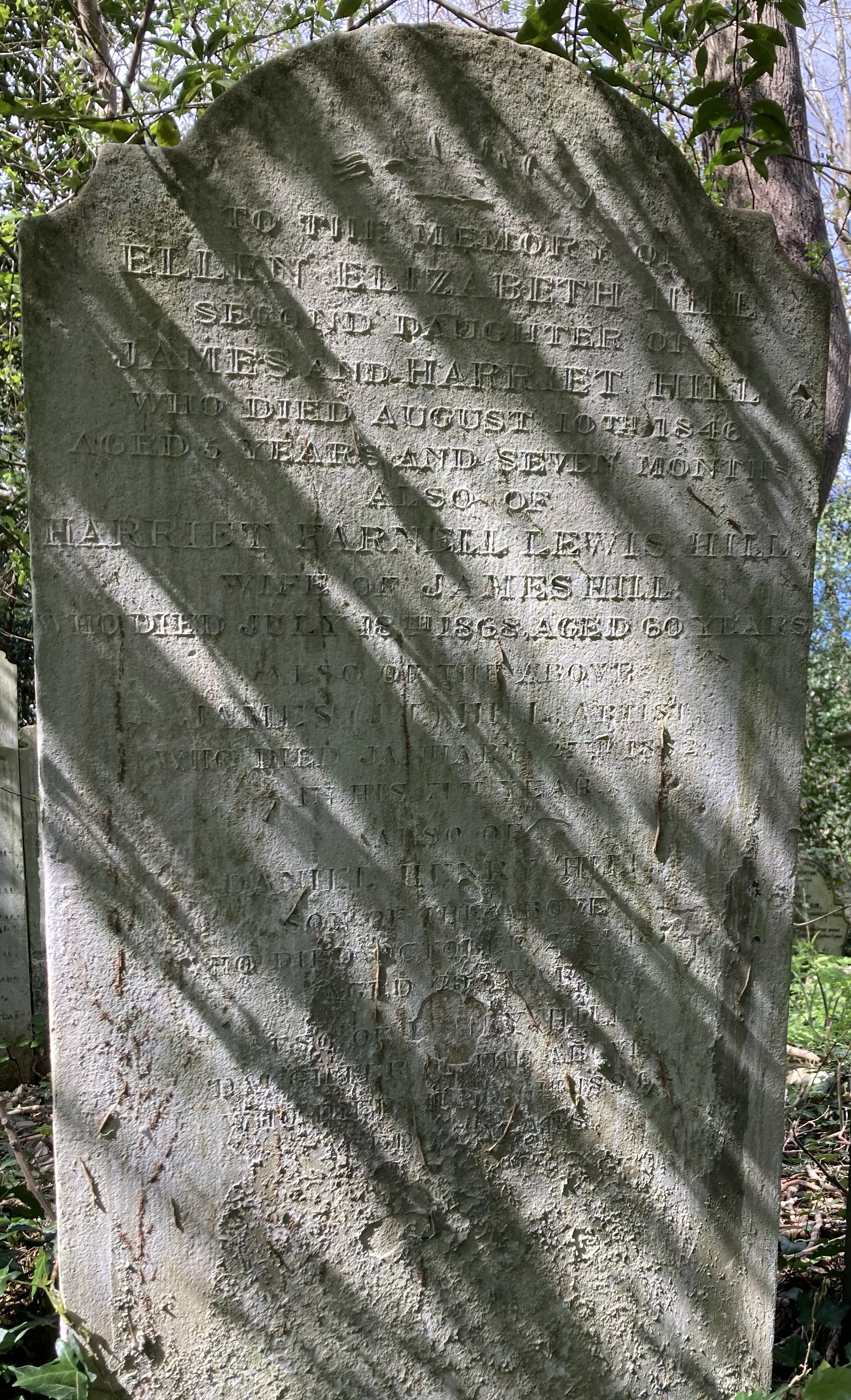
Grave of James John Hill in Highgate Cemetery

In his later life, Hill devoted himself primarily to painting landscapes and had a number of his paintings featured in London newspapers.

He died on 27 January 1882, aged 71, at Sutton House, London, having contracted bronchitis and was buried in a family grave on the west side of Highgate Cemetery.

== Family ==
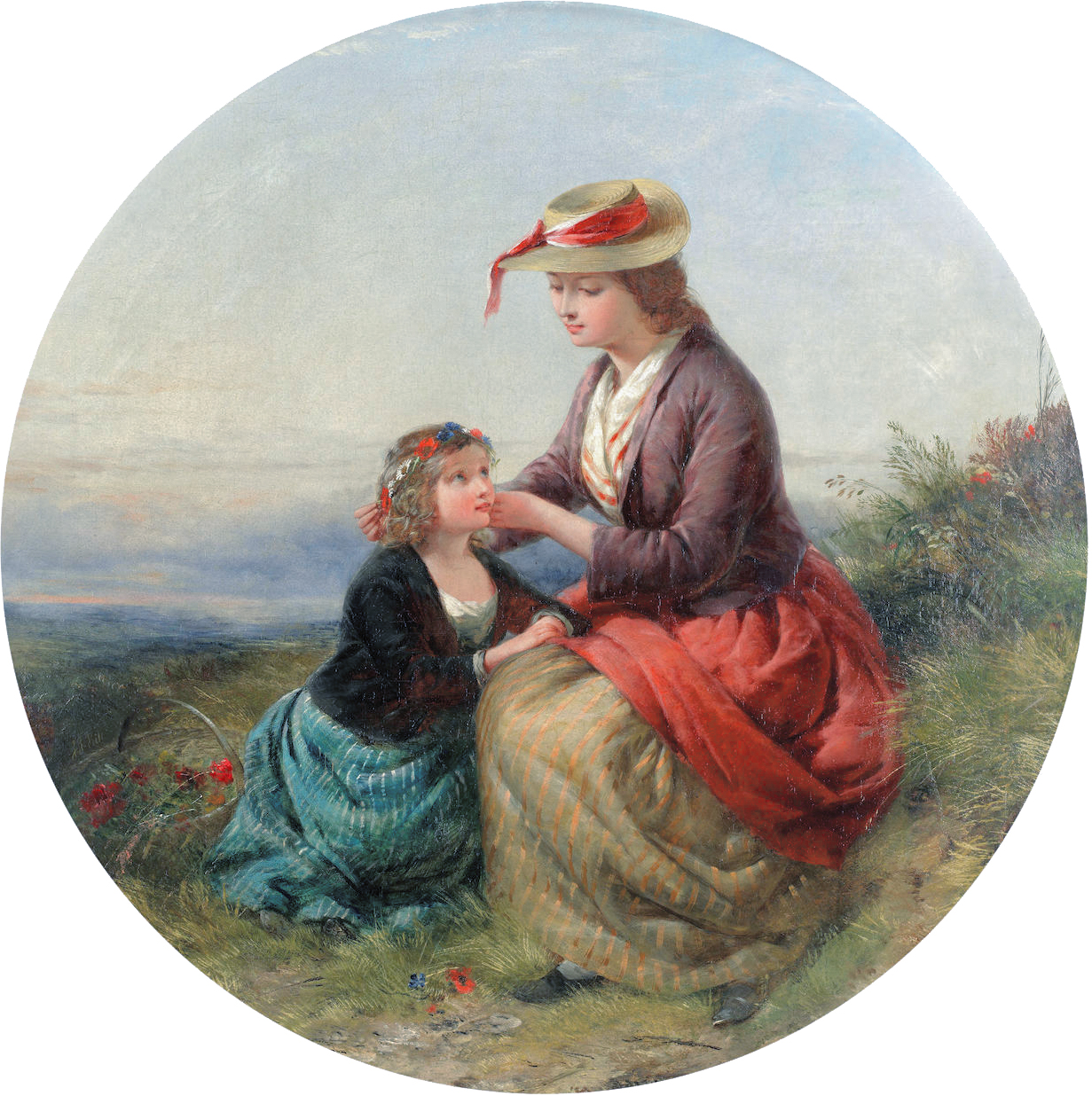
A spring headdress

Hill had five children altogether. His first child – also James John Hill – was born to an unknown mother in 1838, and the other four – Daniel, Emily, Thomas and Alfred – to Harriet Parsons. His eldest son went on to become a marine engineer and had many children of his own. Hill's brother, Daniel Rowlinson Hill, was an architect based in Birmingham, and his cousin was Daniel Rowlinson Ratcliff, a lock and safe manufacturer and also an MP.

== See also ==
- List of British artists
- Royal Society of British Artists
- Thomas Baker
- Lady Burdett-Coutts
- Thomas Creswick
- Peter Hollins
- James Tibbits Willmore
