= James Tibbits Willmore =

English engraver (1800–1863)

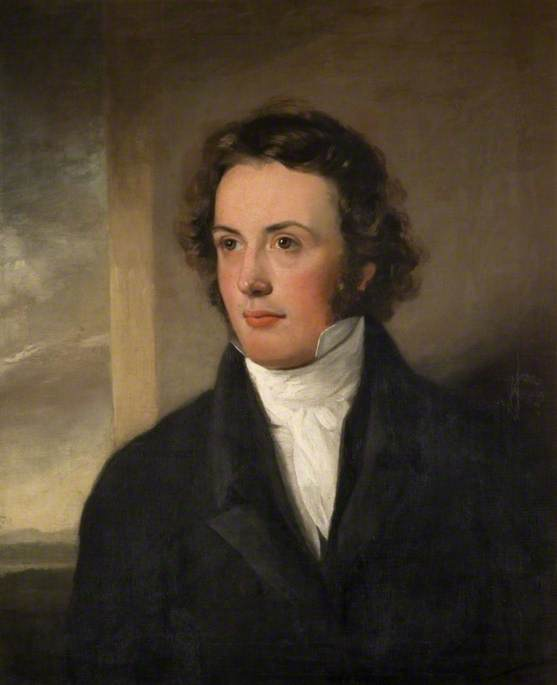
- Portrait of Willmore c. 1828
- Born: September 1800; Handsworth, England
- Died: 12 March 1863 (aged 62); London, England
- Resting place: Highgate Cemetery
- Occupation: Engraver

James Tibbits Willmore ARA (September 1800 – 12 March 1863) was a British engraver.

== Biography ==
He was born at Bristnal's End, Handsworth (then Staffordshire, now West Midlands). Contemporaneous authorities differ on the spelling of his middle name, as seen in the citations below.

His father, James Willmore, was a manufacturer of silverware. At the age of fourteen Willmore was apprenticed to the Birmingham engraver William Radclyffe. His younger brother Arthur Willmore (1814–1888) trained with him, and also became an engraver. Radclyffe had received drawing lessons in Birmingham from Joseph Barber. He married, and in 1823 he went to London where he worked for Charles Heath for three years. He later worked on the plates of William Brockedon's Passes of the Alps and Turner's England and Wales.

He made engravings after Chalon, Leitch, Stanfield, Landseer, Eastlake, Creswick and Ansdell, and especially after Turner. Willmore engraved thirteen pictures on copper for Turner's England and Wales series, beginning in 1828, and eight on steel for his Rivers of France. He made a number of large single plates after Turner, including Ancient Italy in 1842. The next year he exhibited this print at the Royal Academy (the first he had shown there), and was elected an associate engraver of the academy.

He died on 12 March 1863 and is buried on the western side of Highgate Cemetery.

== Gallery ==
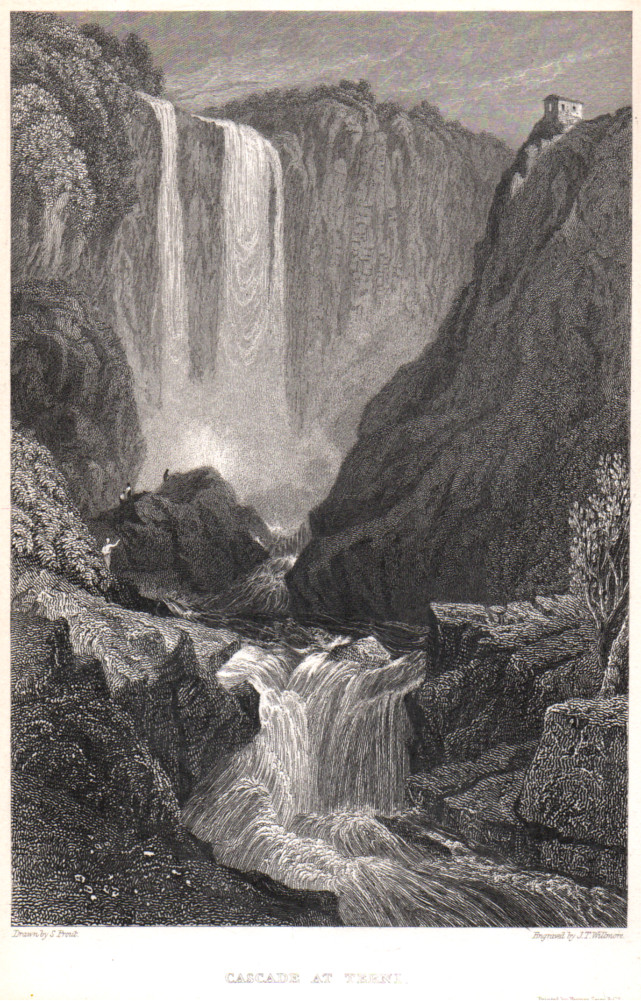
Engraving of the 'Cascade at Terni' by James Tibbits Willmore after a drawing by Samuel Prout. Published 1830.

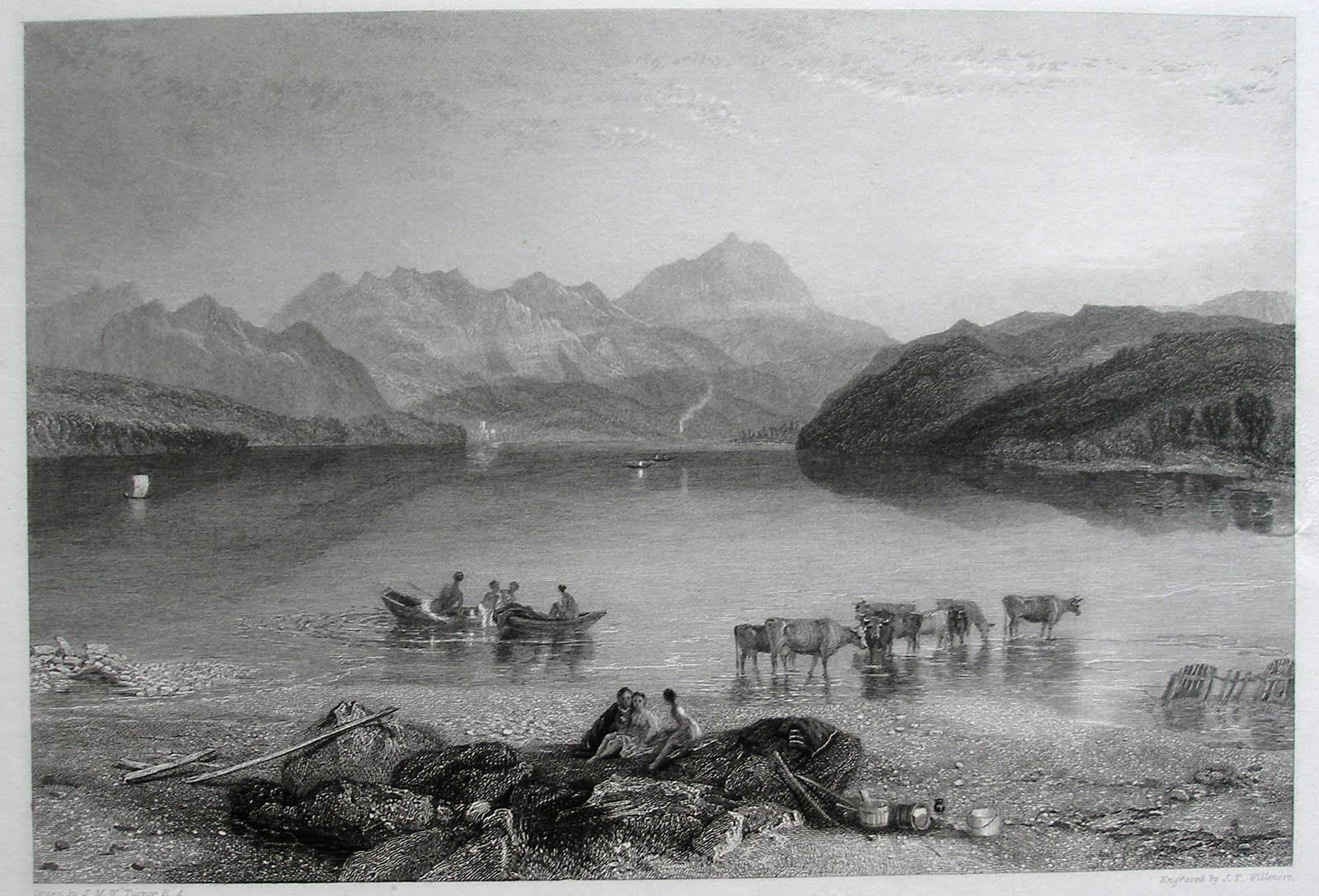
Ullswater, Cumberland Engraving by James Tibbits Willmore for Turner's Picturesque Views in England and Wales

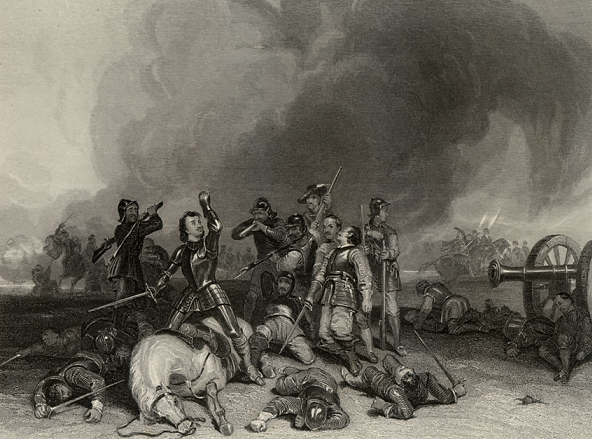
Battle of Hopton Heath after George Cattermole (1800–1868)

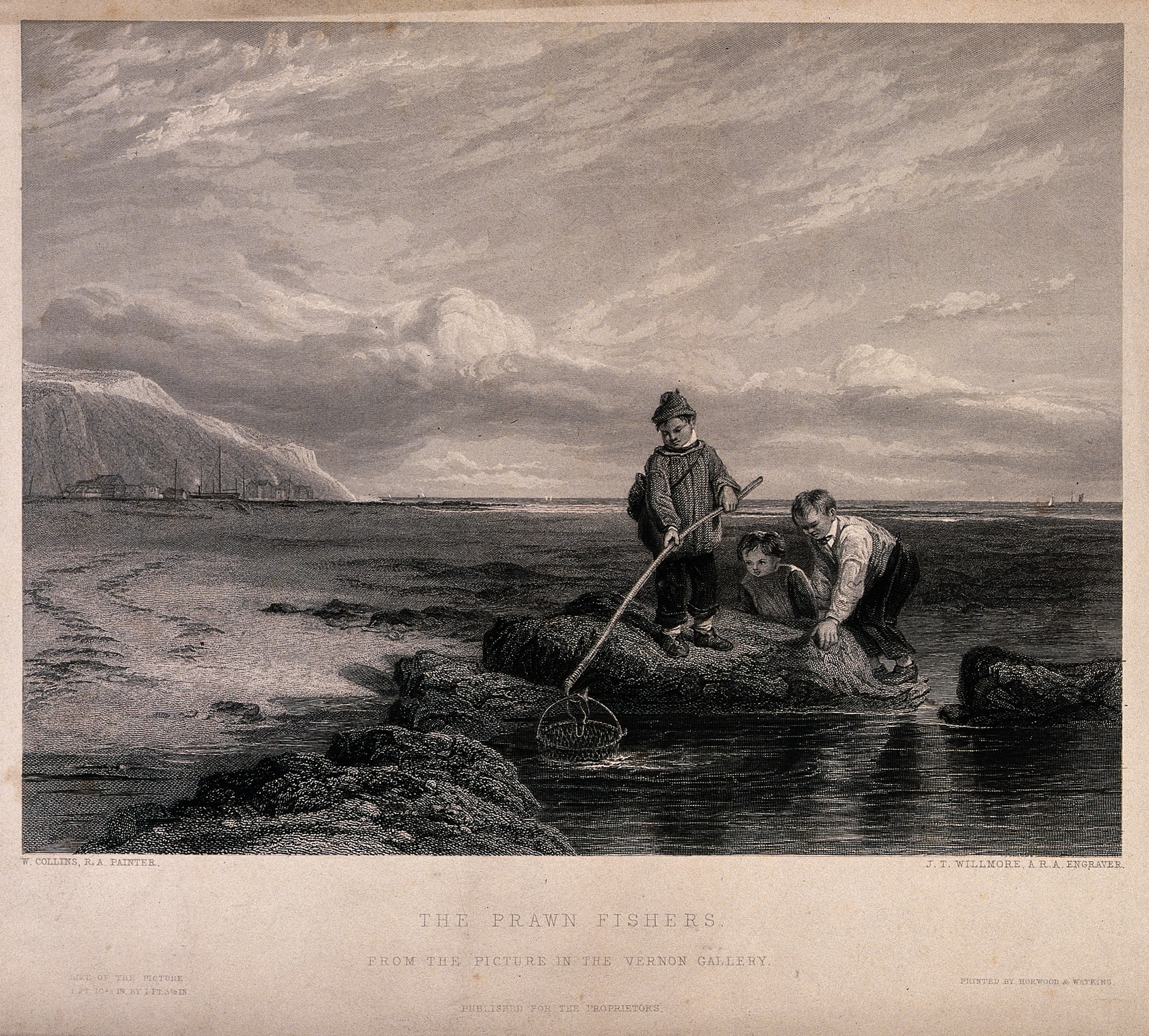
Three young boys are fishing in rock pools with a large net after Prawn Fishing by William Collins

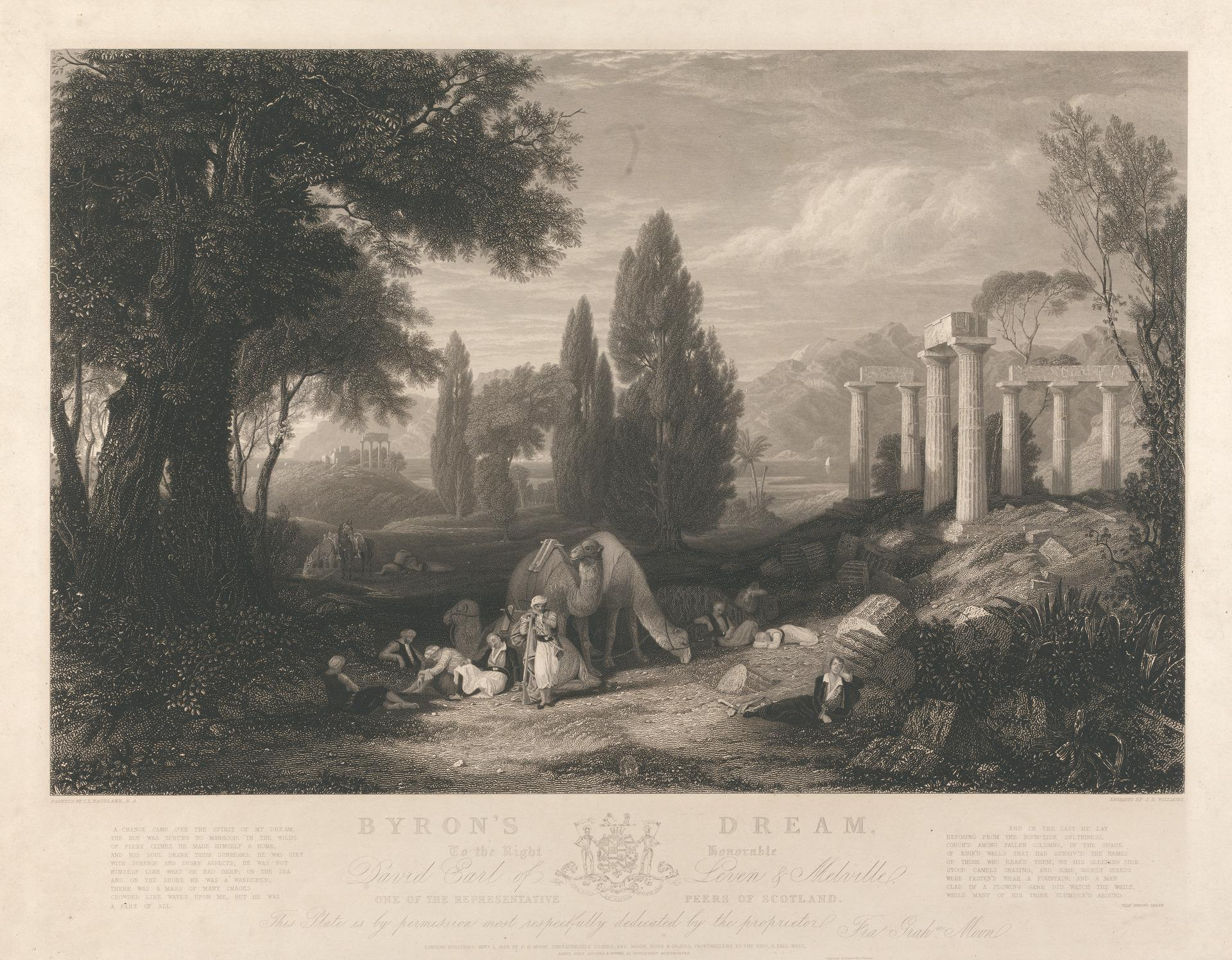
1833 engraving based on Charles Lock Eastlake's Lord Byron's Dream

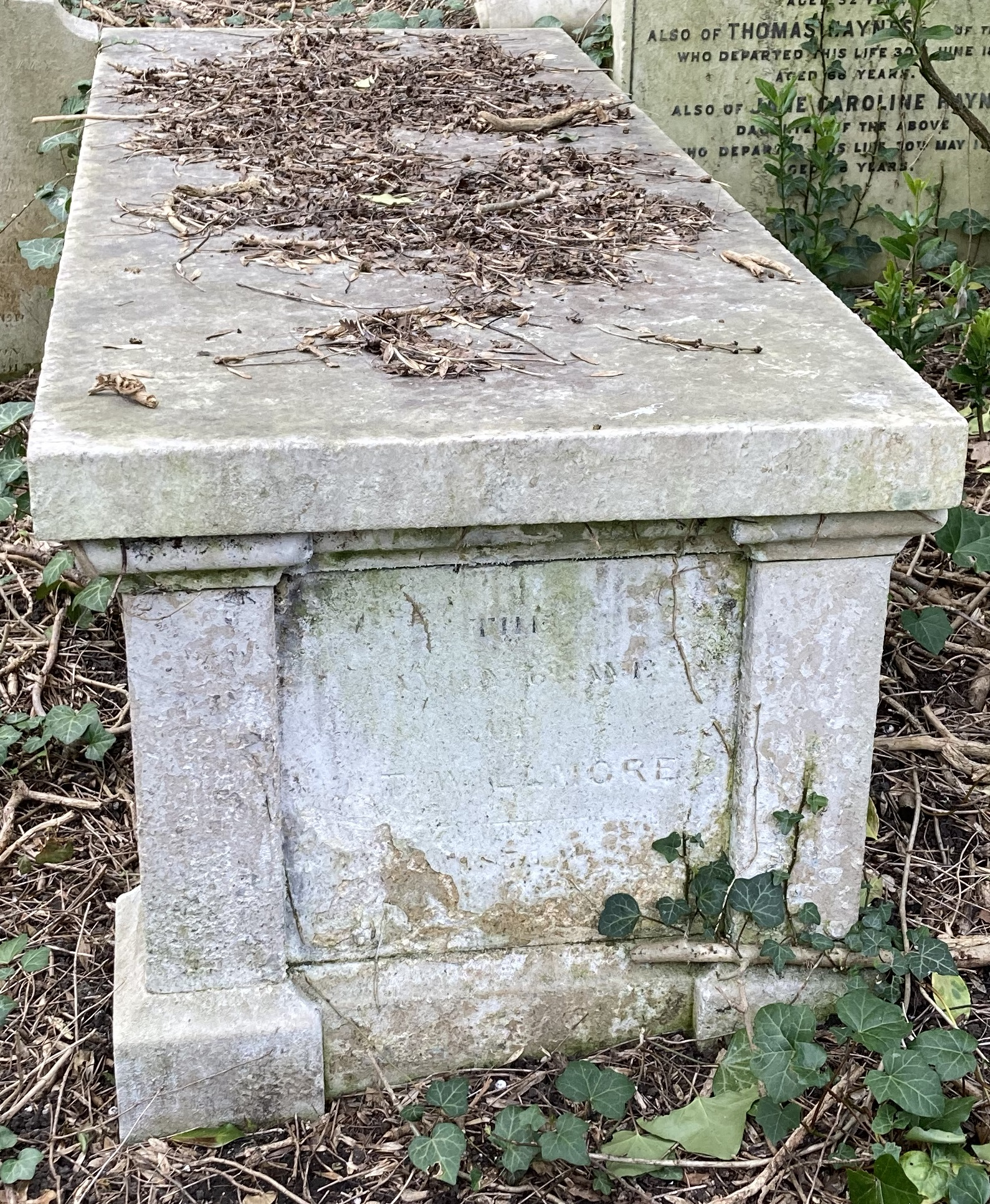
Grave of James Tibbits Willmore in Highgate Cemetery
