= Lord Byron's Dream =

Painting by Charles Lock Eastlake

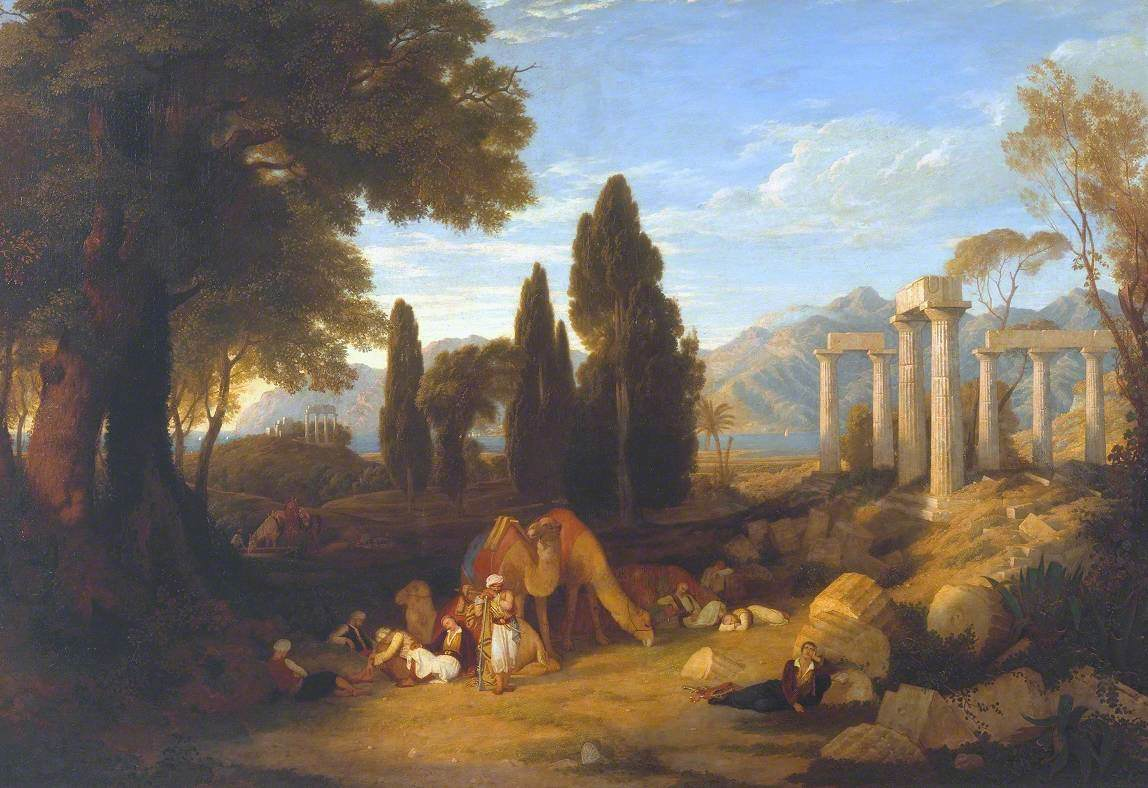
- Artist: Charles Lock Eastlake
- Year: 1827
- Type: Oil on canvas, historical painting
- Dimensions: 118.1 cm × 170.8 cm (46.5 in × 67.2 in)
- Location: Tate Britain, London

Lord Byron's Dream is a landscape painting by the British artist and future president of the Royal Academy Charles Lock Eastlake, from 1827.

== History and description ==
Painted in Rome in 1827 while Eastlake was on an artistic Grand Tour, it was shipped to England and placed in the care of his friend J. M. W. Turner, who had admired it while he himself was in Italy. Turner assisted in the painting's exhibition at the Royal Academy Exhibition of 1829, while Eastlake was still abroad.

The painting is inspired by Lord Byron's 1816 poem The Dream and depicts the Romantic poet on his travels taking a rest by a ruined temple and dreaming his future poem. It refers specifically to lines 114–122 of the poem, and may have inspired Turner's own later work Childe Harold's Pilgrimage (exhibited in 1832), based on another of Byron's poems.

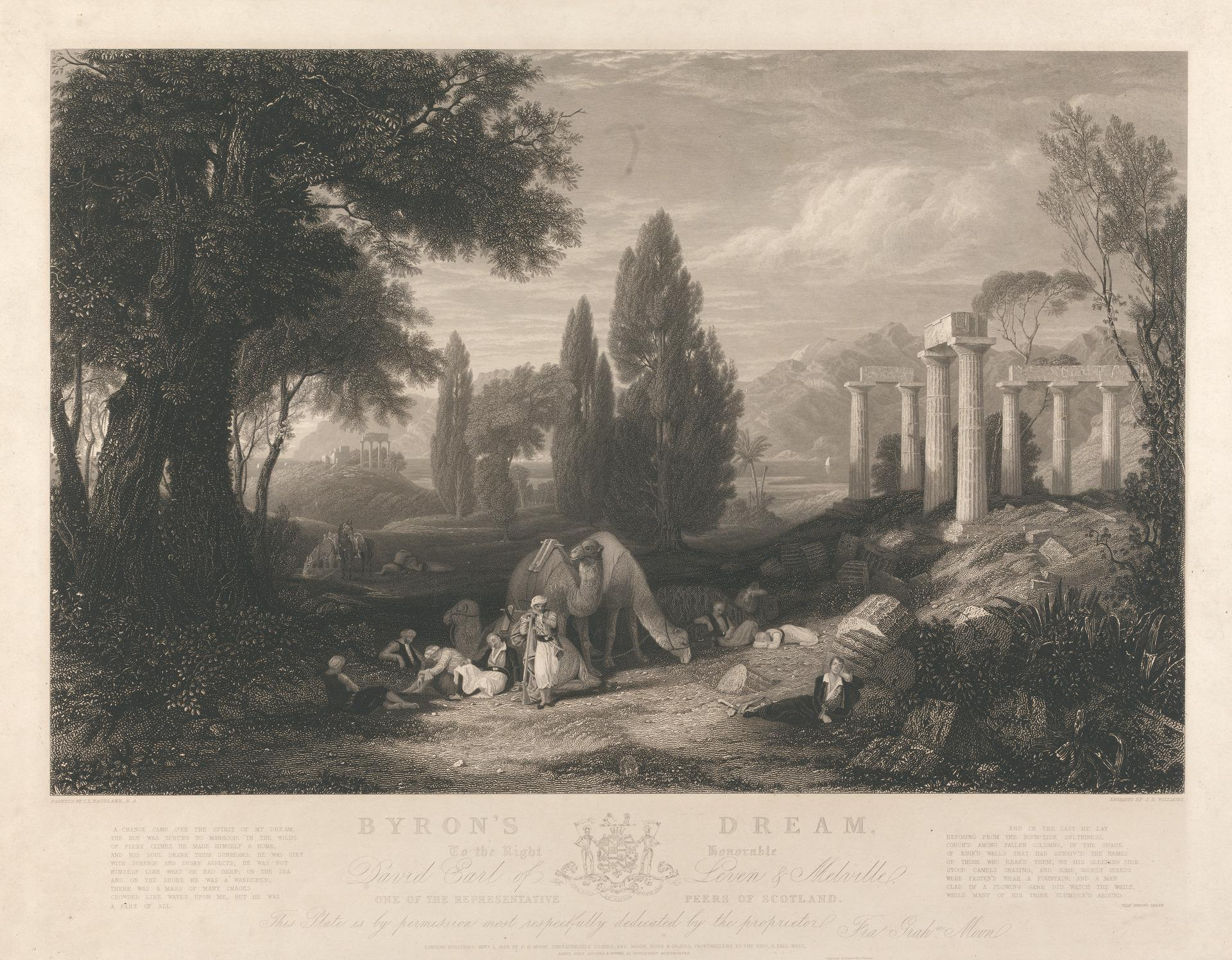
1833 engraving by James Tibbits Willmore based on the painting.

The painting is now in the collection of Tate Britain in London, which acquired it in 1872.

An engraving of 1833 by James Tibbits Willmore based on Eastlake's work is now in the Yale Center for British Art.

== Bibliography ==
- Beevers, Robert. The Byronic Image: The Poet Portrayed. Olivia Press, 2005.
- Beaton, Roderick. Byron's War: Romantic Rebellion, Greek Revolution. Cambridge University Press, 2013.
- Heffernan, James. Cultivating Picturacy: Visual Art and Verbal Interventions. Baylor University Press, 2006.
- St Clair, William. Who Saved the Parthenon?: A New History of the Acropolis Before, During and After the Greek Revolution. Open Book Publishers, 2022.
- Solecki, Sam. The Etruscans in the Modern Imagination. McGill-Queen's Press, 2022.
