= May Day (painting) =

Painting by William Collins

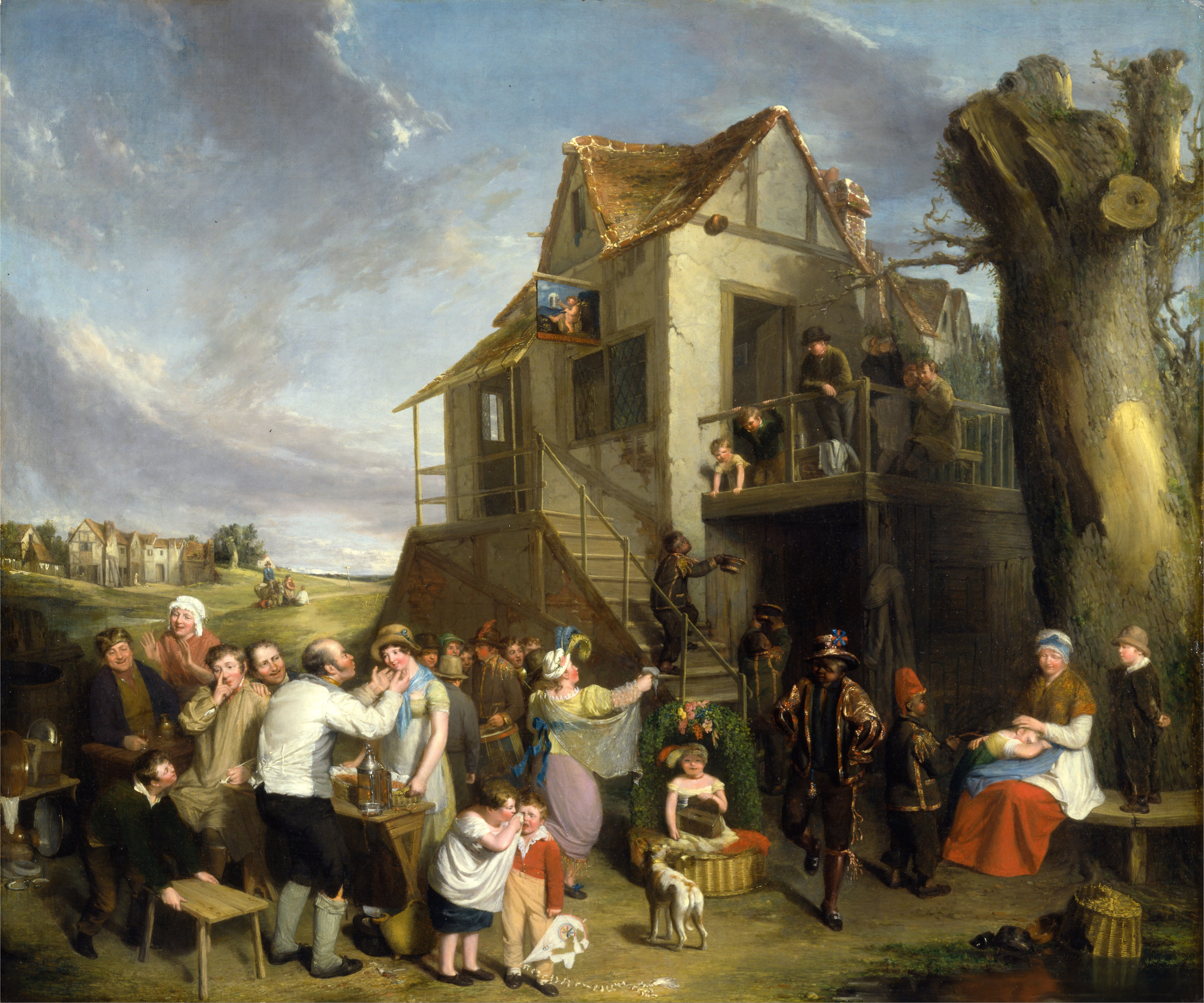
- Artist: William Collins
- Year: 1812
- Type: Oil on canvas, genre painting
- Dimensions: 94 cm × 111.8 cm (37 in × 44.01 in)
- Location: Yale Center for British Art; New Haven

May Day is an oil on canvas genre painting by the British artist William Collins, from 1812.

== History and description ==
It depicts a group of revellers celebrating the traditional May Day festival, outside an English village inn, possibly on the outskirts of London. Young chimney sweeps in costume are shown begging for coins, while a May Queen dances to the beat of a drum. It was entered into the British Institution's annual exhibition. Collins was paid 150 guineas for the painting. Today it is in the collection of the Yale Center for British Art, in New Haven.

== Bibliography ==
- Cameron, David Kerr. The English Fair. Sutton Publishing, 1998.
- Peters, Catherine. The King of Inventors: A Life of Wilkie Collins. Princeton University Press, 2014.
- Solkin, David H. Painting Out of the Ordinary: Modernity and the Art of Everyday Life in Early Nineteenth-century Britain. Yale University Press, 2009.
