= Shrimp Boys at Cromer =

Painting by William Collins

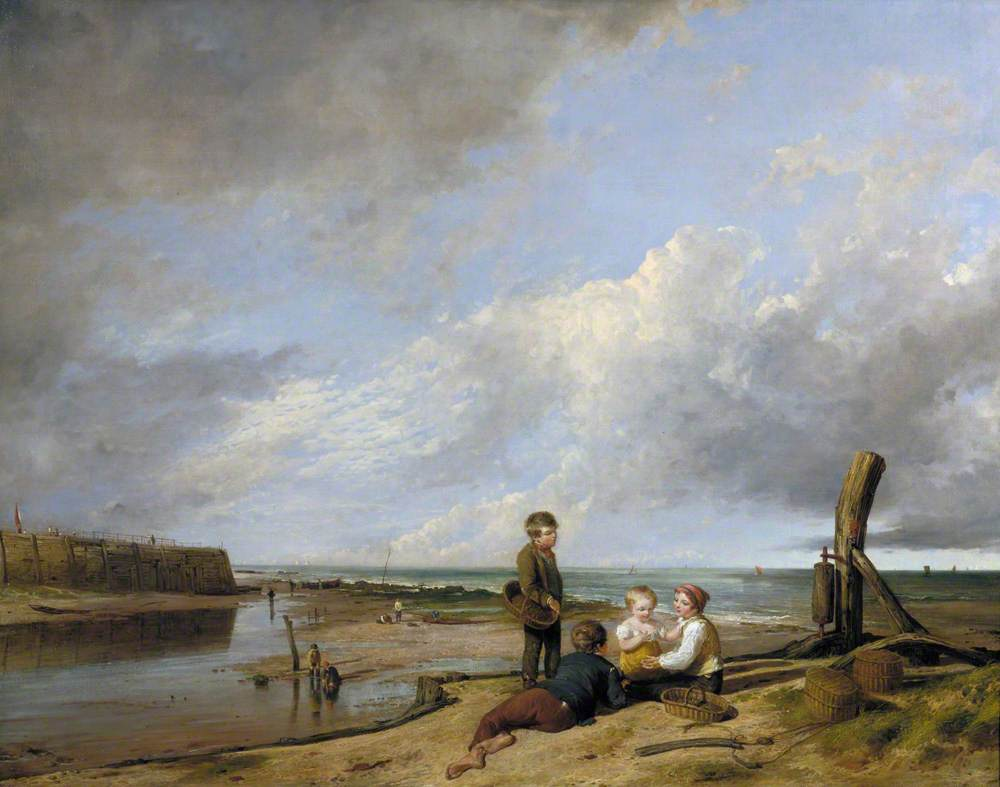
- Artist: William Collins
- Year: 1815
- Type: Oil on canvas, genre painting
- Dimensions: 86 cm × 133 cm (34 in × 52 in)
- Location: Guildhall Art Gallery; London

Shrimp Boys at Cromer is an 1815 oil painting by the British artist William Collins. A genre painting, it depicts a scene on the coast of England near Cromer in Norfolk as a group of children pause while shrimping. Shrimps were an important part of the local economy. Collins had visited the Norfolk coast the previous year and it served as the inspiration for several pictures.

The painting was displayed at the Royal Academy Exhibition of 1816 held at Somerset House in London. A mezzotint based on the work was produced by the engraver William Ward. The picture was later acquired by the art collector Charles Gassiot who in 1902 donated it to the Guildhall Art Gallery in the City of London.

== Bibliography ==
- Baker, William. Wilkie Collins's Library: A Reconstruction. Bloomsbury Publishing, 2002.
- Gear, Josephine. Masters Or Servants?: A Study of Selected English Painters and Their Patrons of the Late Eighteenth and Early Nineteenth Centuries. Garland Publishing, 1977.
- Roe, Sonia & Hardy, Pat. Oil Paintings in Public Ownership in the City of London. Public Catalogue Foundation, 2009.
