= William Collins (painter) =

English painter (1788-1847)

William Collins RA
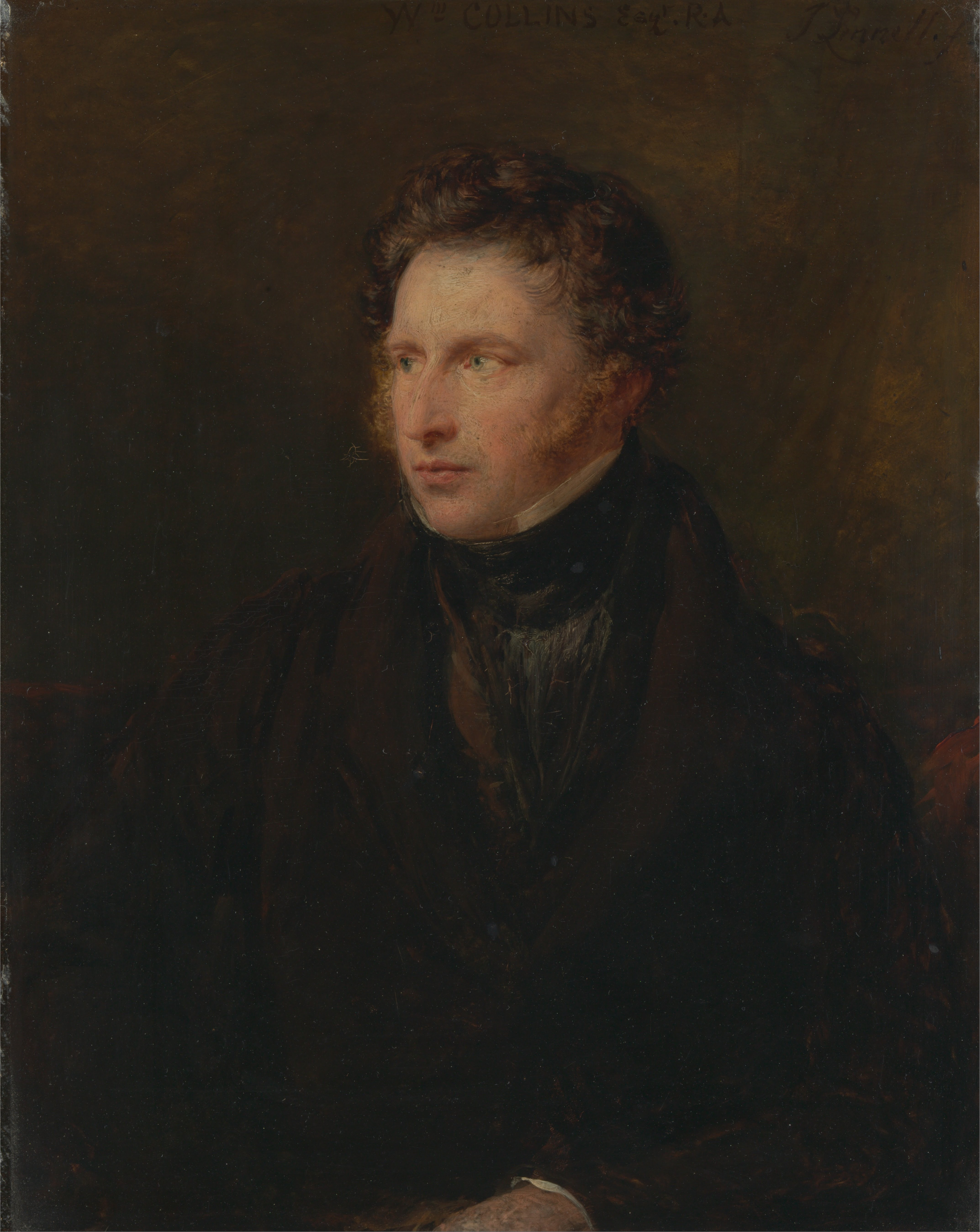
- Portrait of William Collins (1831) by John Linnell
- Born: 8 September 1788; London, England
- Died: 17 February 1847 (aged 58); London, United Kingdom

William Collins RA (8 September 1788, London – 17 February 1847, London) was an English landscape and genre painter. His sentimental paintings of poor people enjoying nature became a posthumous high fashion, notably in the 1870s when his market price rose higher than Constable (Cromer Sands, £3780, 1872) and stayed so until 1894. Turner, his model, far exceeded him in value (The Grand Canal, Venice, sold to Vanderbilt in 1885 for £20,000).

== Life and work ==
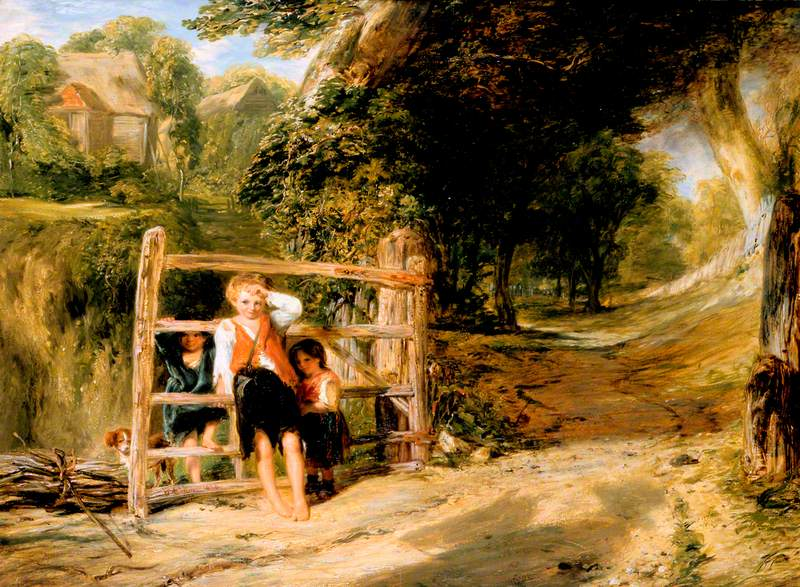
Rustic Civility (1832)

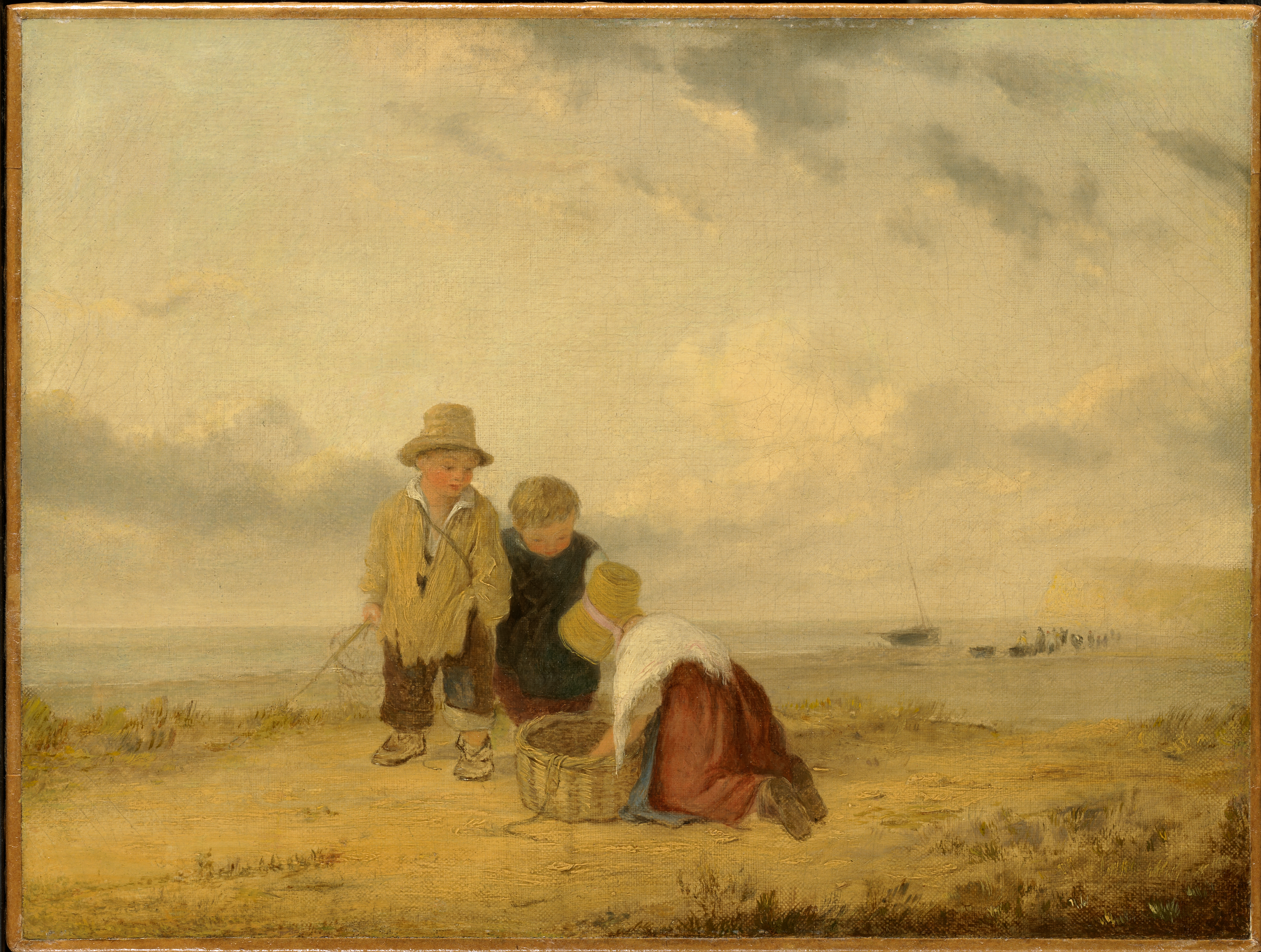
Embodying features of tonalism long before the movement's rise in popularity, Children on the Beach was painted c. 1815–1820 and is housed at the Clark Art Institute.

Collins was born in Great Titchfield Street, London, son of William Collins Sr., an Irish-born picture-dealer and writer. He showed a great aptitude for art from an early age, and was for a while an informal pupil of George Morland. In 1807, he entered the schools of the Royal Academy (at the same time as William Etty), and exhibited at the Academy for the first time in the same year. In 1809 he was awarded a medal in the life school, and exhibited three pictures\: Boy at Breakfast, Boys with a Bird's-nest and a Portrait of Master Lee as he spoke the Prologue at the Haymarket Theatre.

In 1811, Collins sold a picture entitled The Young Fifer to the Marquis of Stafford for 80 guineas (£88), and the next year produced the work which made him famous, The Sale of the Pet Lamb, which was sold for 140 guineas (£154) and engraved by S. W. Reynolds. He now became the chief support of his family after the death of his father (in financial difficulty) and found some valuable patrons, especially Sir Thomas Freeman Heathcote, Sir John Leicester, Sir Robert Peel, Sir George Beaumont, and Lord Liverpool. In 1814 two pictures, The Blackberry Gatherers and The Birdcatchers (both sold privately) won him an associateship of the Royal Academy (ARA).

In 1815, Collins undertook a sketching tour of the coast near Cromer and produced a Scene on the Coast of Norfolk which was acquired by the Prince Regent. In 1817 he visited Paris with Leslie and Washington Allston and painted The Departure of the Diligence from Rouen, and the Scene on the Boulevards (both sold privately) – these were exhibited at the Royal Academy in 1818. He also painted several portraits about this time.

In 1820, Collins was elected a Royal Academician (RA), presenting as his diploma picture Young Anglers. In 1822 he married Harriet Geddes, sister of the portrait painter Margaret Sarah Carpenter. He continued to exhibit with popularity and travel in England and Scotland. In 1826 he painted The Fisherman's Departure, (engraved by Phelps), and in 1828 made a tour of the Netherlands and Belgium, living for short time in Boulogne in 1836. Rustic Hospitality was painted in 1834 and in 1836 Sunday Morning and As Happy as a King, the subject of the latter being suggested to Collins by the story of a country boy whose ideal of regal happiness was swinging on a gate all day and eating fat bacon. Collins painted several works with children as the primary focus, including Children on a Mountain Top (1846), with his earliest examples featuring a color palette closer to tonalism decades before the movement's rise to popularity in the 1880s.

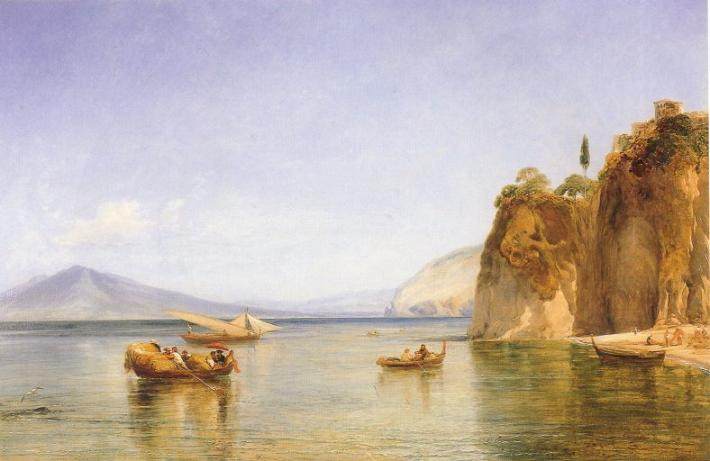
Scene from the Caves of Ulysses, at Sorrento (1841)

In September 1836, Collins left London for Italy, where he remained for two years, occupying himself with advancing his knowledge of painting, but he had to return due to illness. He then began a series of pictures depicting Italian life, including Poor Travellers at the door of a Capuchin Convent near Vico, Bay of Naples and A Scene near Subiaco, both exhibited at the Royal Academy in 1839. They were followed in 1840–1841 by two New Testament subjects: Our Saviour with the Doctors in the Temple, and The Two Disciples at Emmaus.

From 1840 to 1842 Collins was librarian to the Royal Academy and in 1843 moved to a large house at 1 Devonport Street, Hyde Park Gardens. In 1840 he visited Germany and in 1842 the Shetland Islands, the latter inspiring a series of illustrations for Sir Walter Scott's novel Pirate, which appeared in the "Waverley" edition of the book.

In 1846 Collins's Early Morning was exhibited. Ruskin commented, "I have never seen the oppression of sunlight in a clear, lurid, rainy atmosphere more perfectly or faithfully rendered, and the various portions of reflected and scattered light are all studied with equal truth and solemn feeling." Collins also produced some watercolours such as The Rat-catcher, Landing Fish, A Street in Naples and Kentish Peasant Girls, and did several etchings, most of which were given to the British Museum by Mrs. Collins, along with engravings of his best works.

== Death ==
Collins died of heart disease, "terminating in dropsy", in Devonport Street on 17 February 1847. He was buried in the cemetery of the church of St. Mary, Paddington, where a monument in the form of a cross was erected by his widow. The grave now stands isolated, on the north side of St Marys Gardens, after the churchyard's conversion into a public park in 1881. It has been vandalised, and the marble cross is missing; the inscription is also eroding.

He left two sons, the elder being the novelist William Wilkie Collins, named after his godfather, who wrote a biography of his father entitled Memoirs of the Life of William Collins (1848), and the younger being Charles Allston Collins, also a painter. In 1850, three years after Collins died, his widow Harriet and their sons moved to 17 Hanover Terrace, Regent's Park, next door to Collins's former patron and friend John Gibbons (1777–1851) at No. 16, and in 1856, when Collins's widow Harriet gave up No. 17, she moved next door to stay with Gibbons's widow, Elizabeth Steen.

== Works ==
Collins exhibited at the Royal Academy every year from 1807 to 1846 (a total of 124 pictures) and showed 45 pictures at the British Institution. His major works are listed in Volume 2 (pp. 341–352) of "Memoirs" (see Bibliography).

Today his works appear in the collections at the Victoria and Albert Museum and Tate Britain in London and at other regional centres.

== Gallery ==
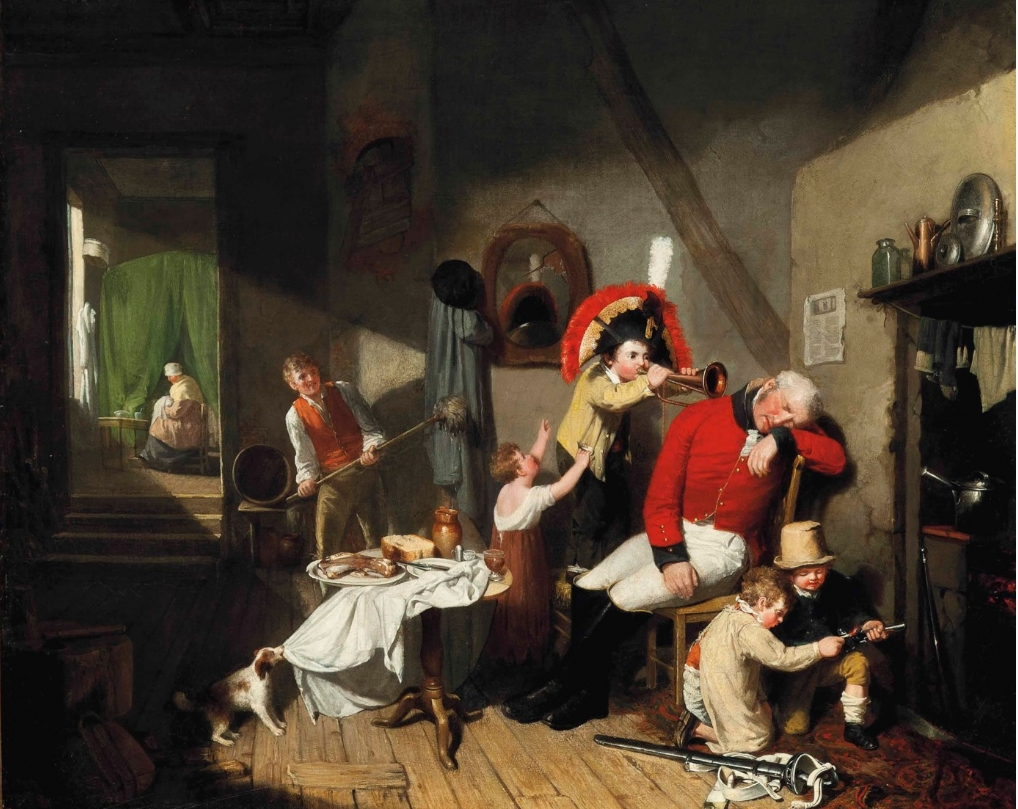
The Weary Trumpeter, 1811

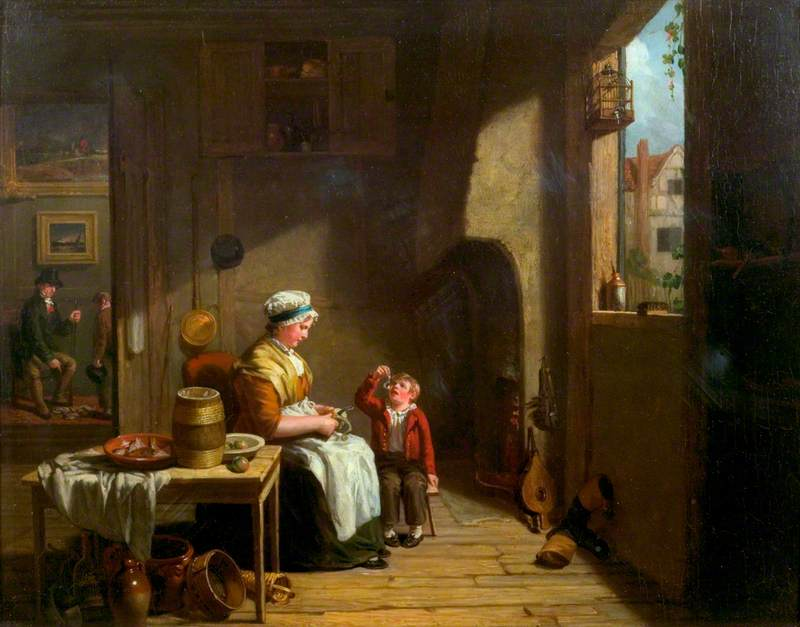
A Country Kitchen, 1811

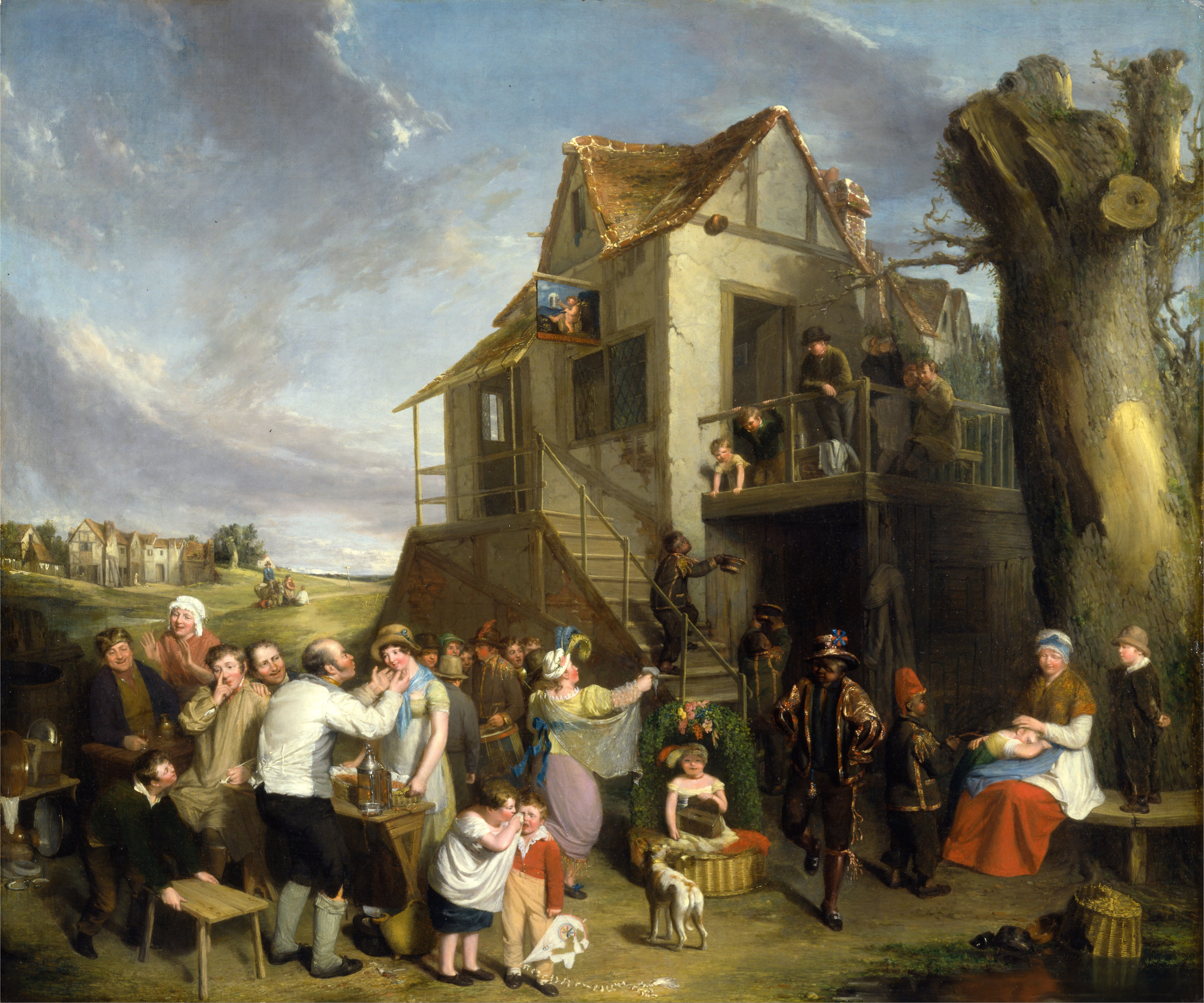
May Day, 1812

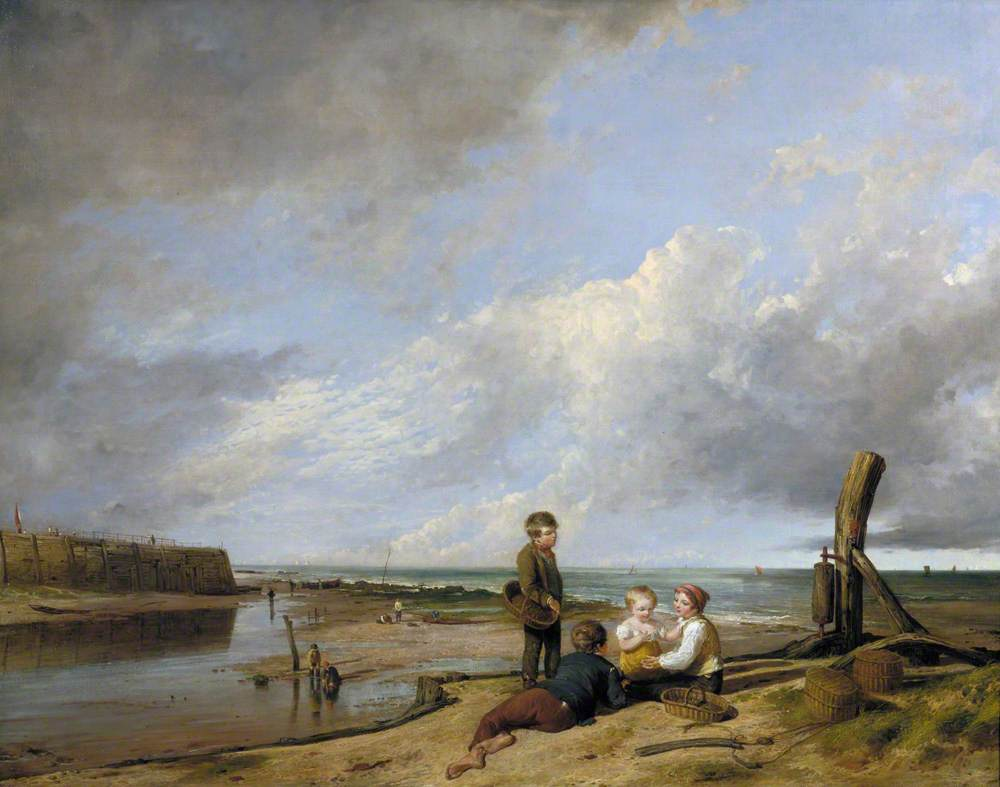
Shrimp Boys at Cromer, 1815

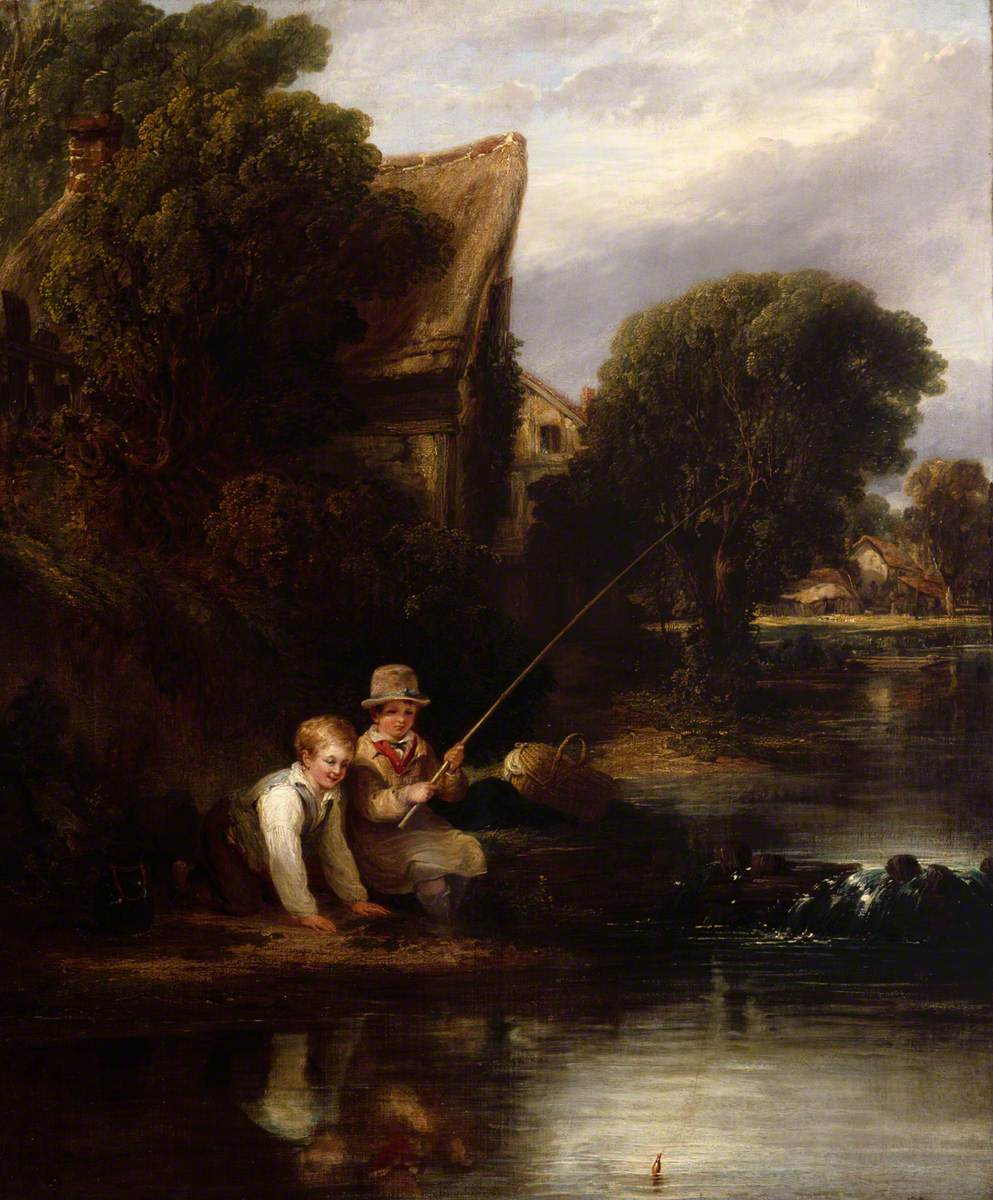
Young Anglers, 1820

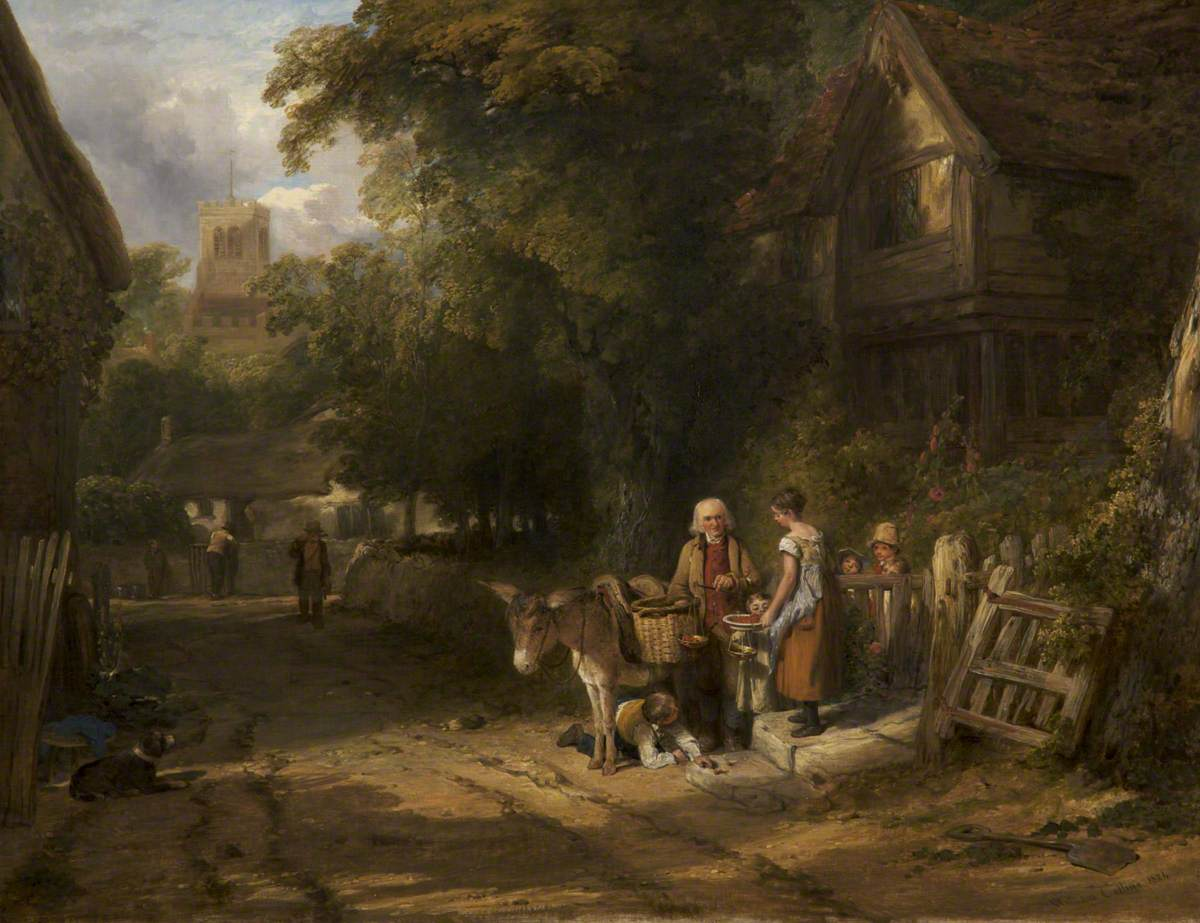
The Cherry Seller, 1824

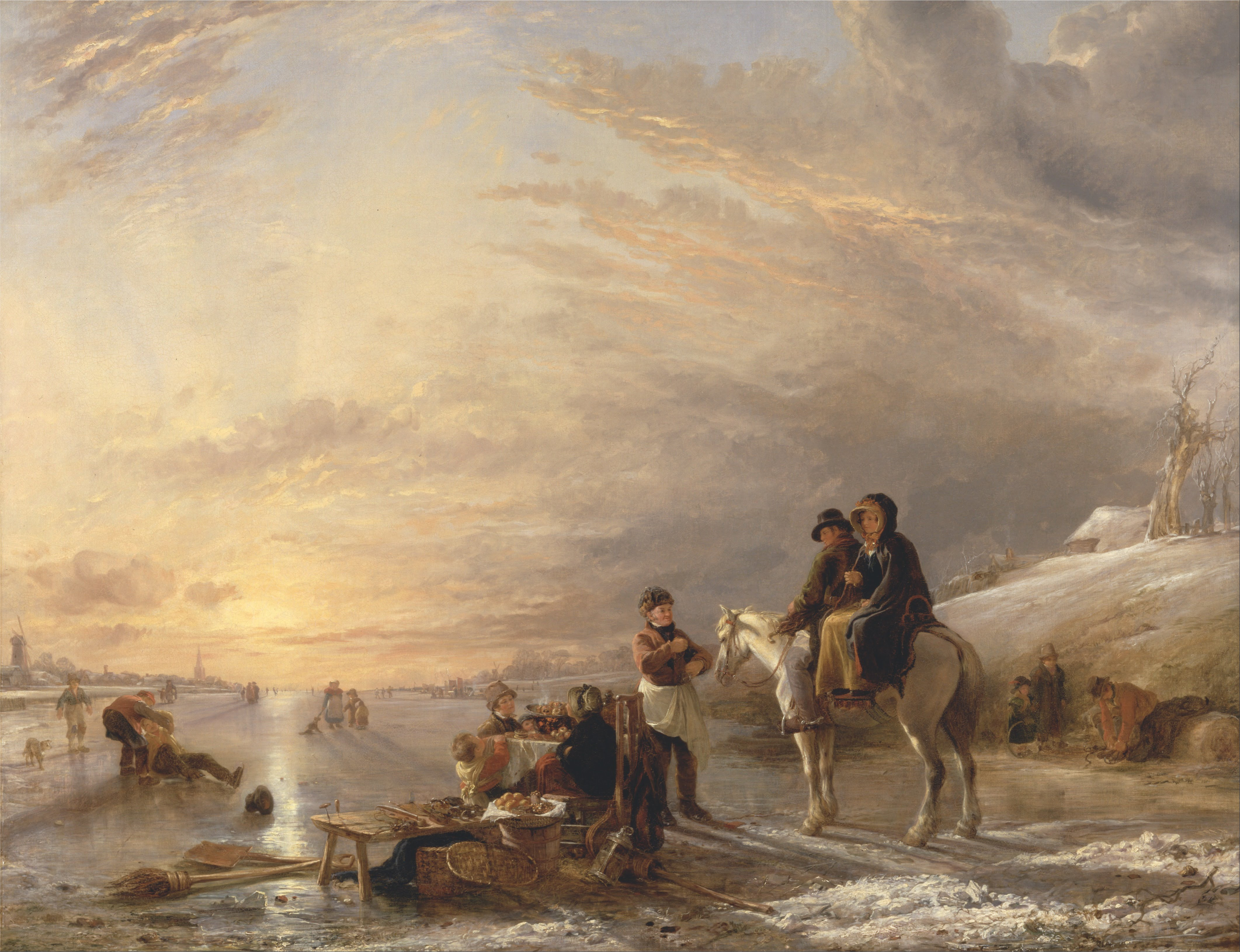
A Frost Scene, 1827

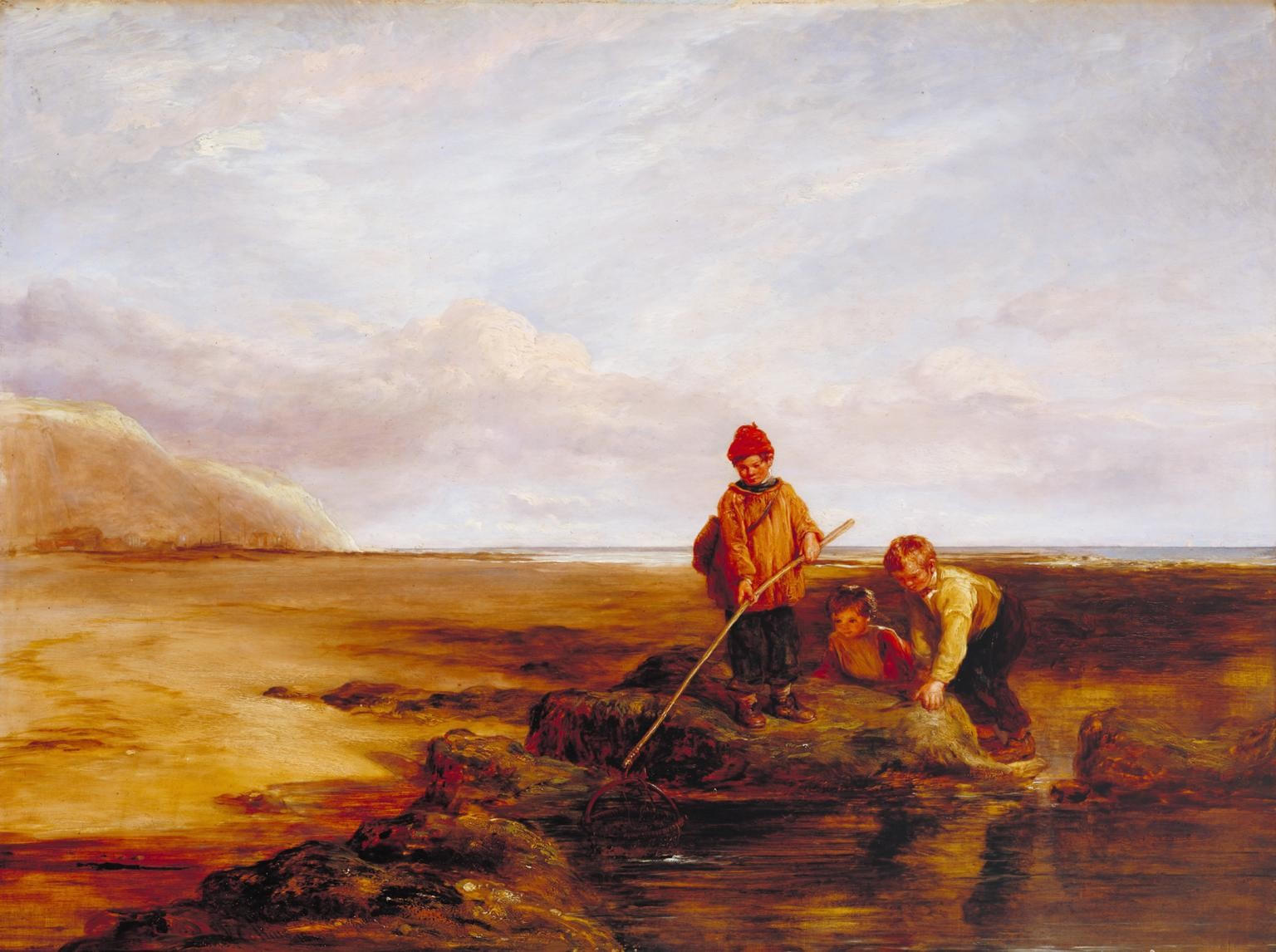
Prawn Fishing, 1828

Skittle Players, 1832

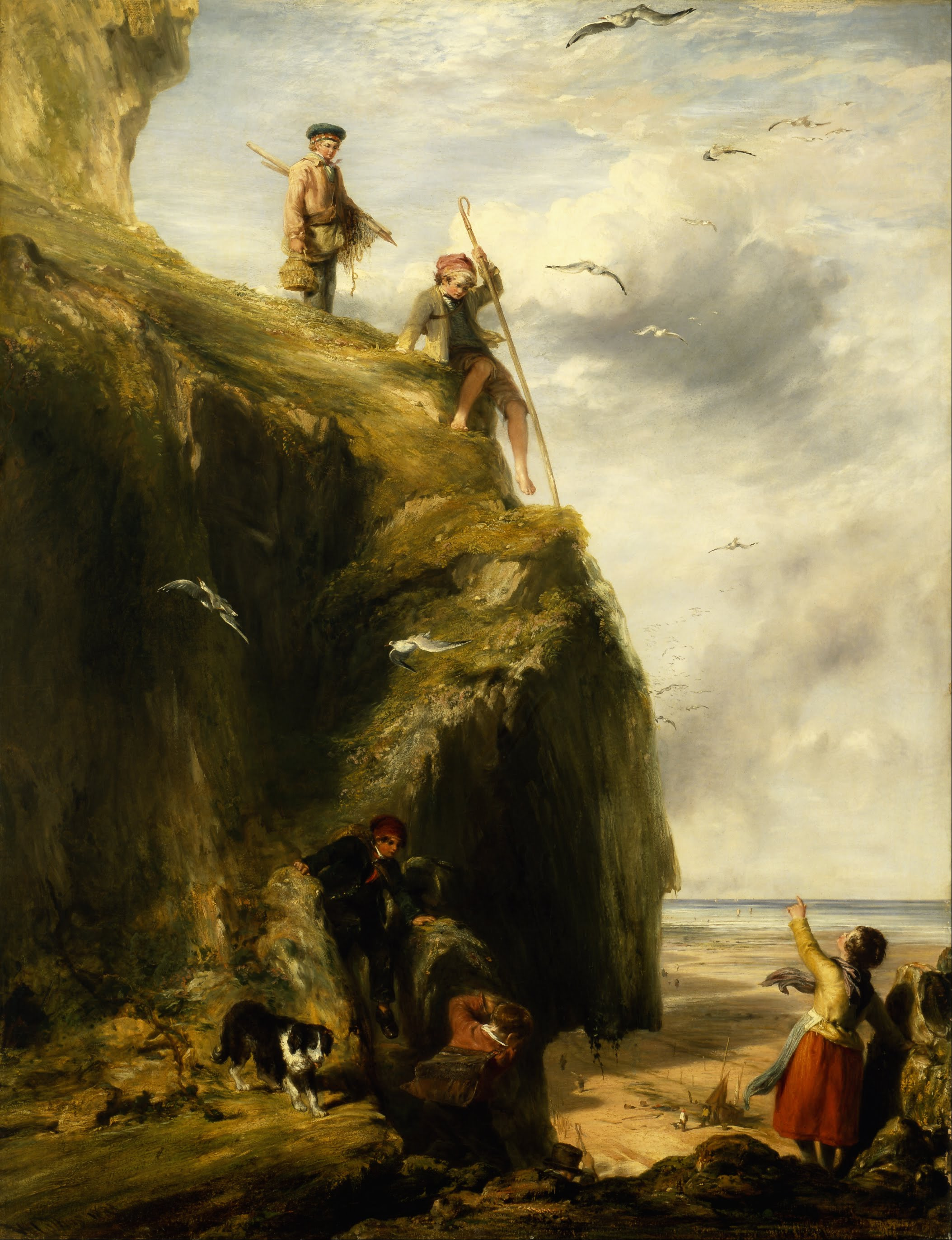
Returning from the Haunts of the Seafowl, 1833

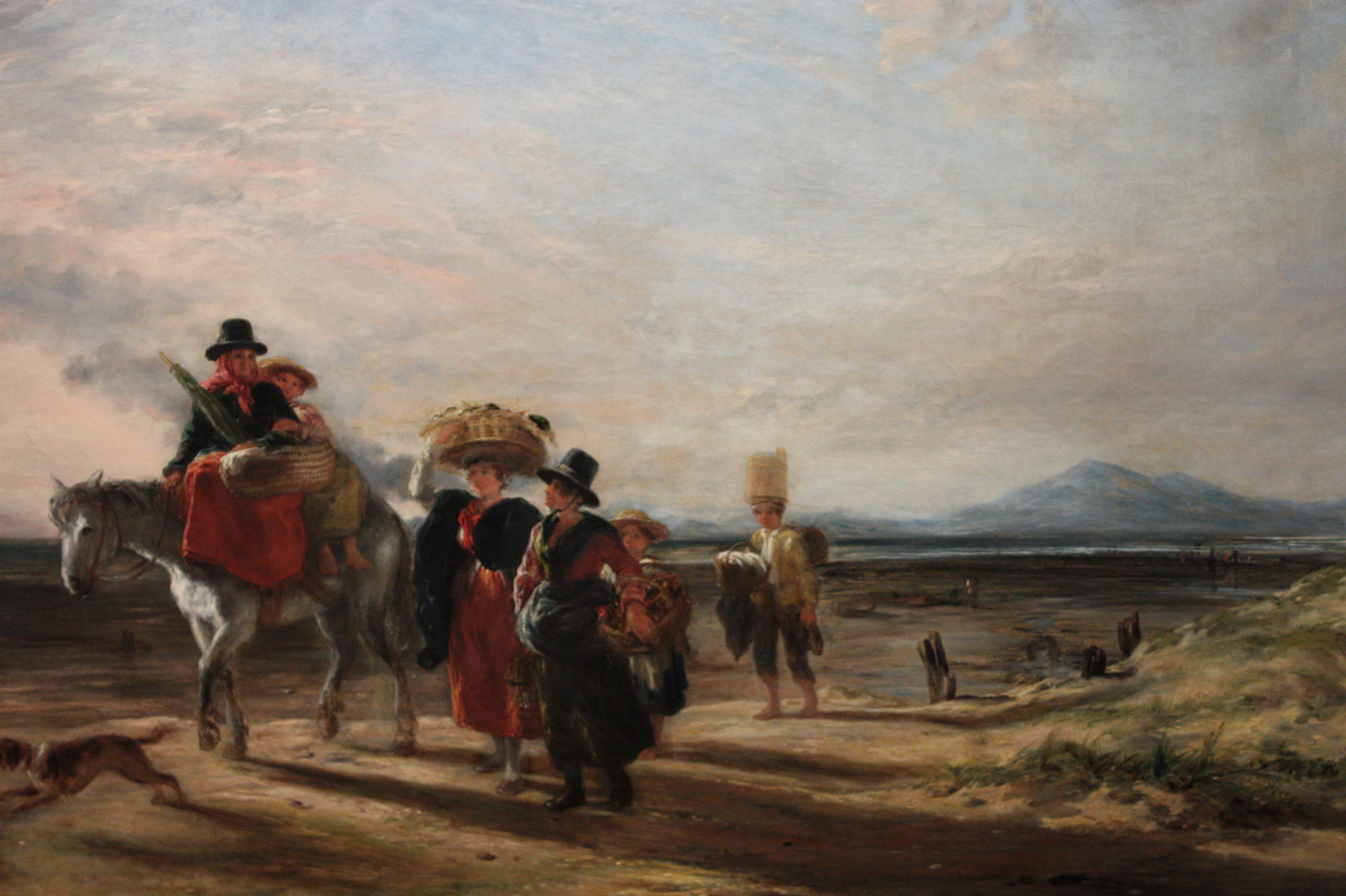
Barmouth Sands, 1835

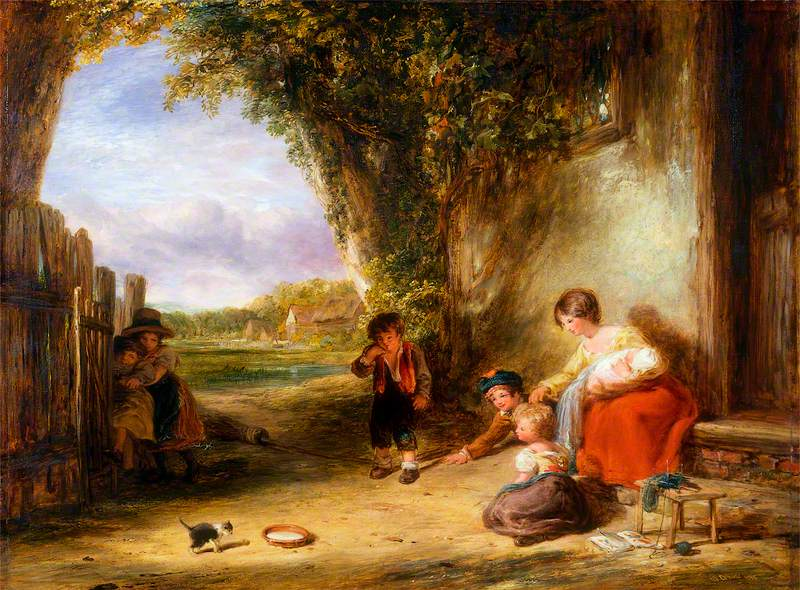
The Stray Kitten, 1835

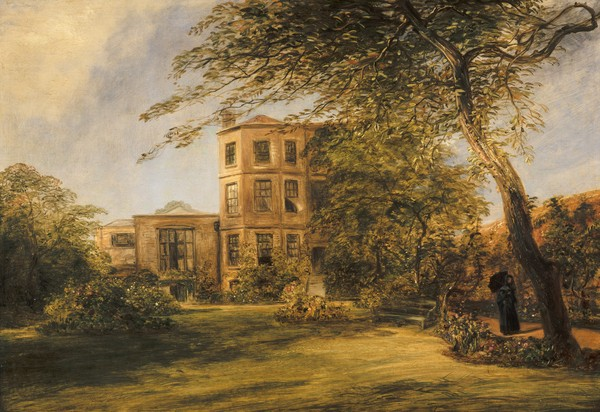
View of Sir David Wilkie's House in Kensington, 1842

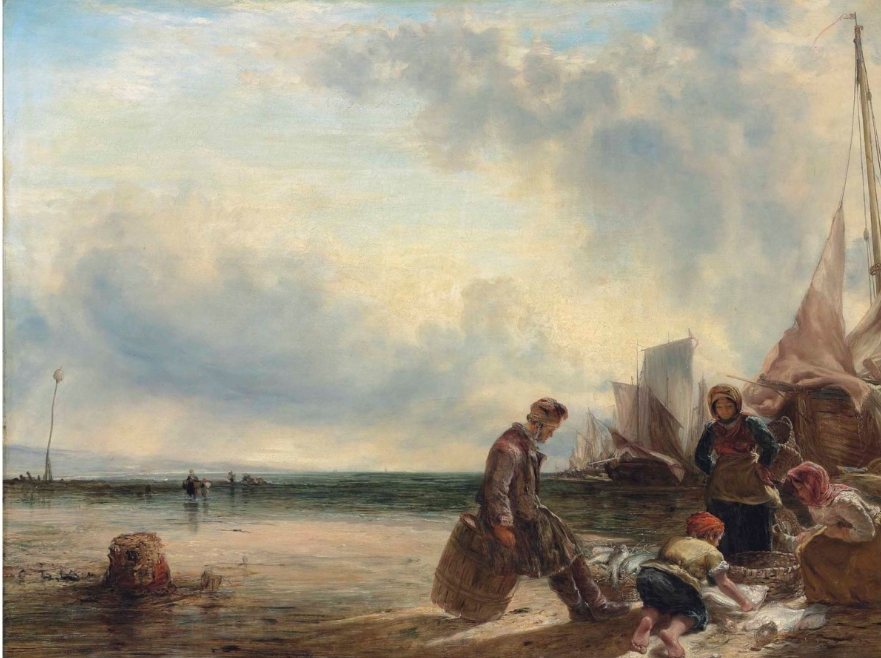
Morning, Boulogne, 1844

Seaford, Sussex, 1844

== Bibliography ==
- This article incorporates text from a publication now in the public domain: Fagan, Louis Alexander (1885–1900). "Collins, William (1788-1847)". Dictionary of National Biography. London: Smith, Elder & Co.
- Wilkie Collins, Memoirs of the life of William Collins, Esq., R. A: Volume 1, Volume 2 (London: Longman, Brown, Green and Longmans, 1848)
