= Memoirs of the Life of William Collins =

1848 biography by Wilkie Collins

- Author: Wilkie Collins
- Language: English
- Genre: Biography
- Publisher: Longman, Bowman & Green
- Publication date: 1848
- Publication place: United Kingdom
- Media type: Print

Memoirs of the Life of William Collins is an 1848 biography by the British author Wilkie Collins. It chronicles the life and artworks of his father the painter William Collins who had died the previous year. It was originally published in two volumes by the London publishing house Logman, Bowman & Green. The book was dedicated to the former Prime Minister Robert Peel who had been a patron of William Collins and owned several of his works.

== Bibliography ==
- Grinstein, Alexander. Wilkie Collins: Man of Mystery and Imagination. International Universities Press, 2003.
- Robinson, Kenneth. Wilkie Collins: A Biography. Bodley Head, 1951.
