= Riverscape =

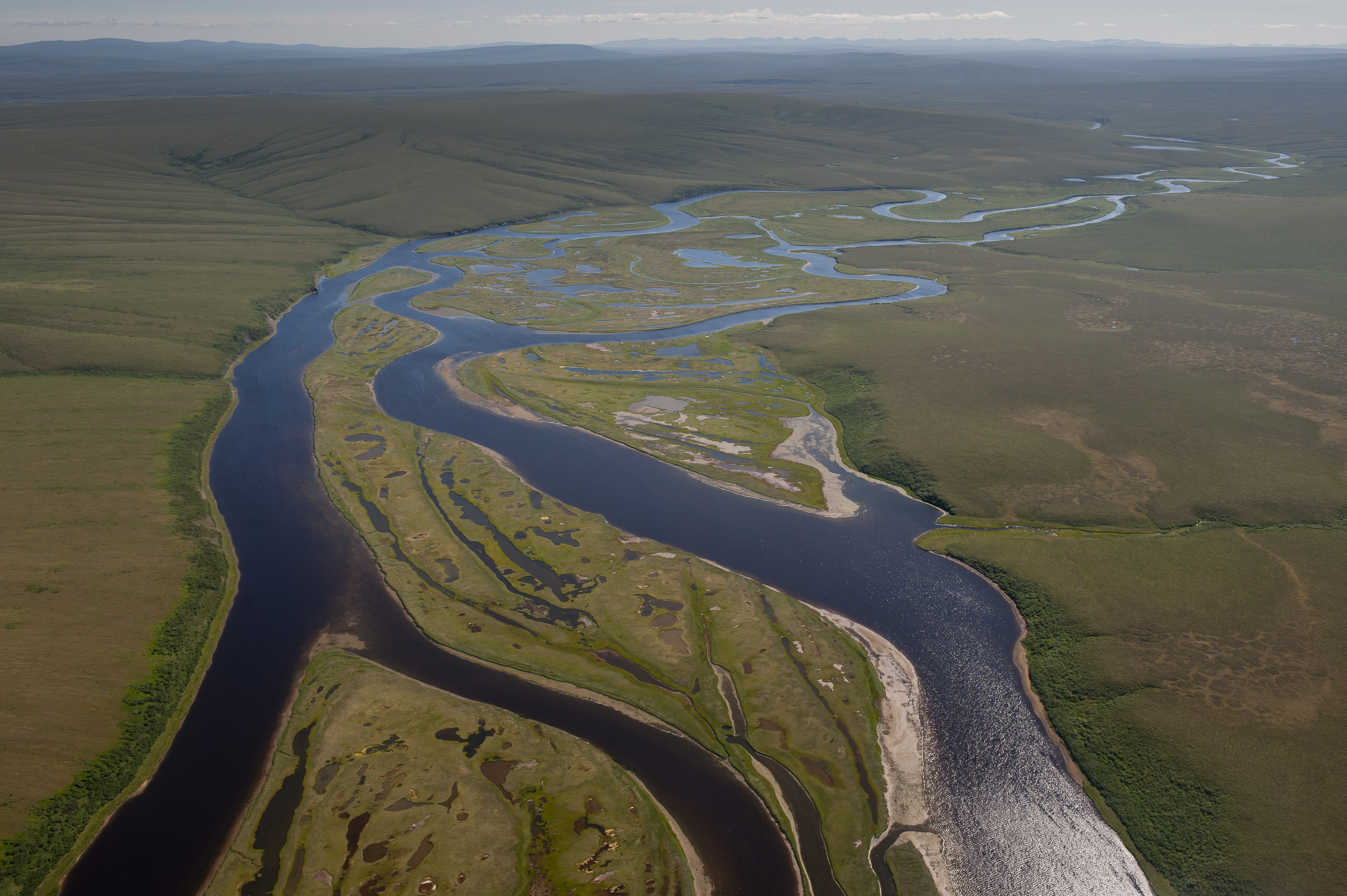
Aerial view of a riverscape of the Kugruk River (Alaska)

A riverscape (also called river landscape) comprises the features of the landscape which can be found on and along a river. Most riverscape features are natural landforms (such as meanders and oxbow lakes) but they can also include artificial landforms (such as man-made levees and river groynes). Riverscapes can be divided into upper course riverscapes, middle course riverscapes, and lower course riverscapes.

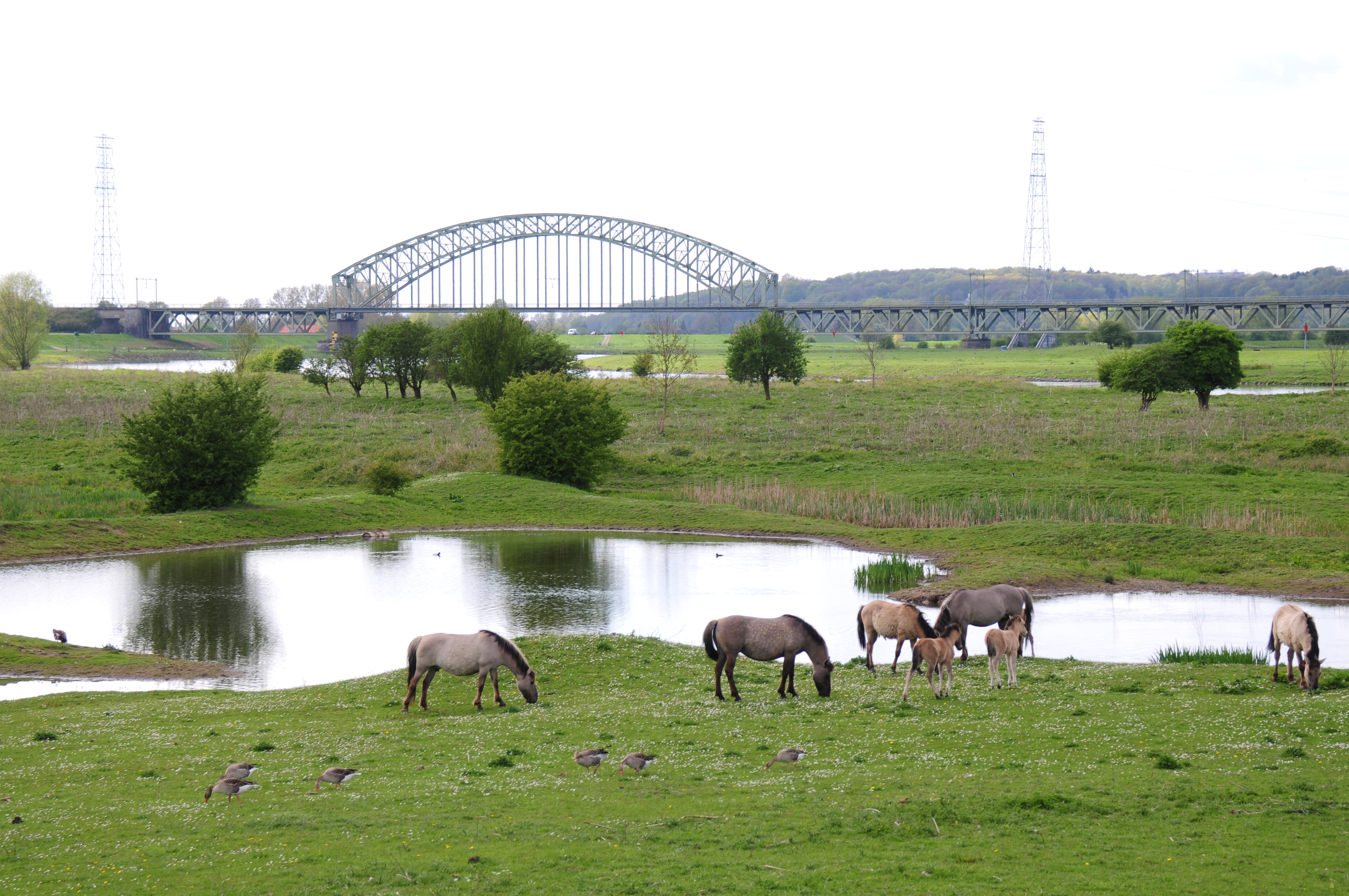
Riverine landscape along the lower course of the Rhine (Netherlands)

The term riverine is sometimes used to indicate the same type of landscape as a riverscape, or only the riverbank. Riverine landscapes may also be defined as a network of rivers and their surrounding land, which is excellent for agricultural use because of the rich and fertile soil. The word riverine is also used as an adjective which means "relating to or found on a river or the banks of a river".

== Upper course ==
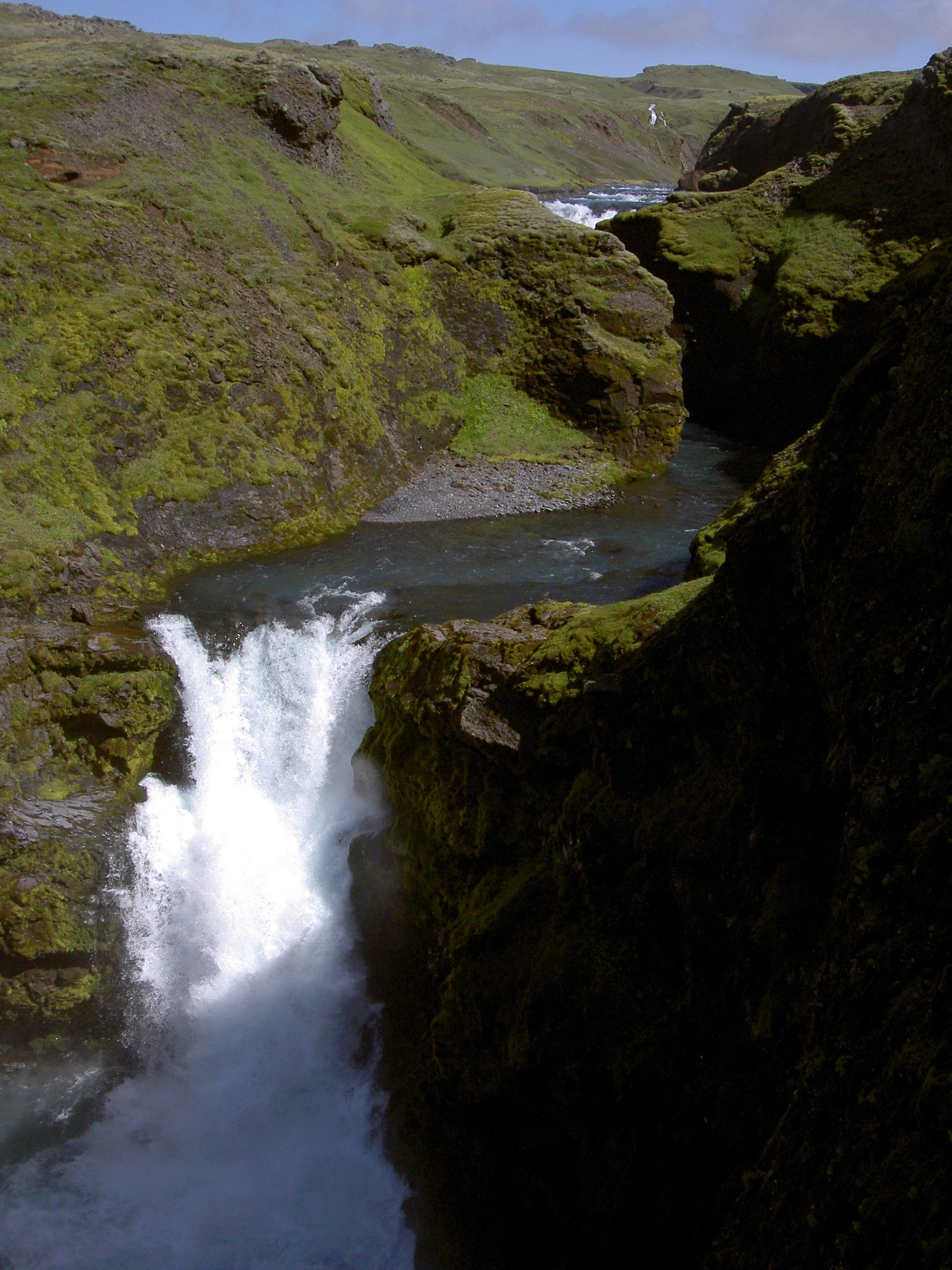
Riverscape of the upper course of the Skógá River (Iceland)

In the upper course of rivers, channels are narrow and gradients are steep. Vertical erosion is the prominent land-forming process. Typical features of upper course riverscapes include:

- Interlocking spurs
- Braided channels
- V-shaped valleys
- Giant's kettles
- Plunge pools
- Alluvial fans
- Tributaries
- Waterfalls
- Potholes
- Gorges
- Rapids

== Middle course ==
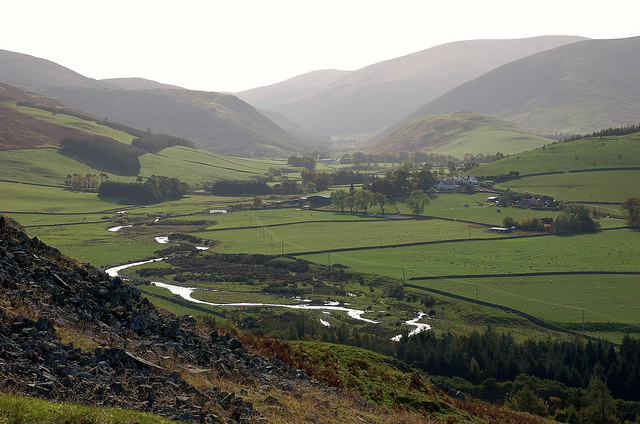
Middle course riverscape of the Manor Water (Scotland)

In the middle course of rivers, the discharge increases and the gradient flattens out. Typical features of middle course riverscapes include:

- U-shaped valleys
- Riparian forests
- Slip-off slopes
- Oxbow lakes
- Tributaries
- Cut banks
- Meanders
- Marshes
- Riffles
- Pools

== Lower course ==
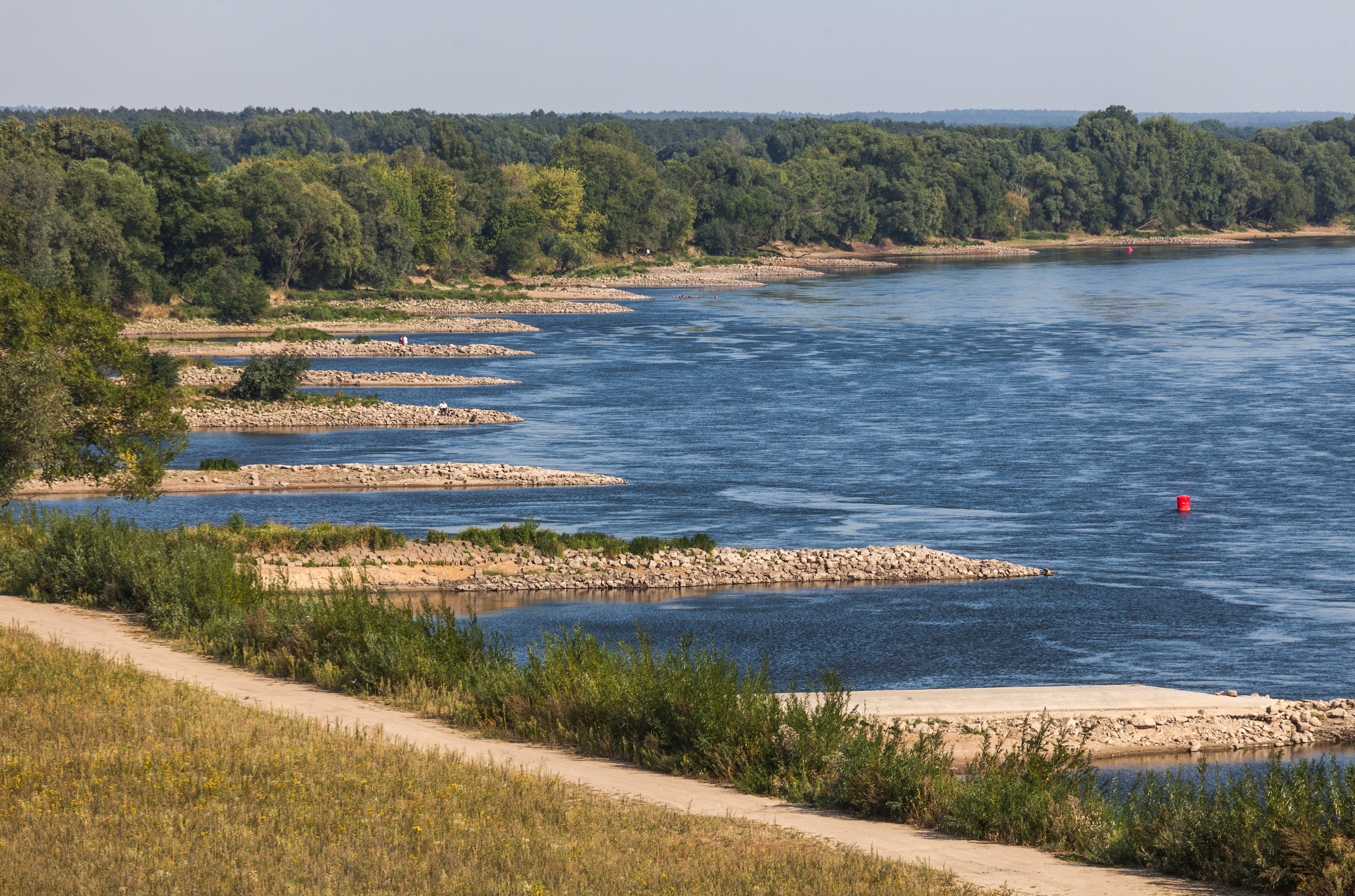
Lower course riverscape of the Vistula (Poland)

In the lower course of rivers, the channels are wide and deep, and the discharge is at its highest. Typical features of lower course riverscapes include:

- Wide flat-bottomed valleys
- River groynes
- Large bridges
- Distributaries
- River deltas
- Floodplains
- Meanders
- Levees
- Kolks

== Landscape art ==
Riverscapes are popular subjects in landscape paintings. In addition to the use of the word riverscape in geography, the term is also associated with landscape art. In visual arts the term 'river scene' is considered a synonym for the word 'riverscape'. Related terms used in visual arts include 'seascape', 'cloudscape' and 'cityscape'. A well-known riverscape painter was Salomon van Ruysdael. Below are some examples of riverscape paintings.

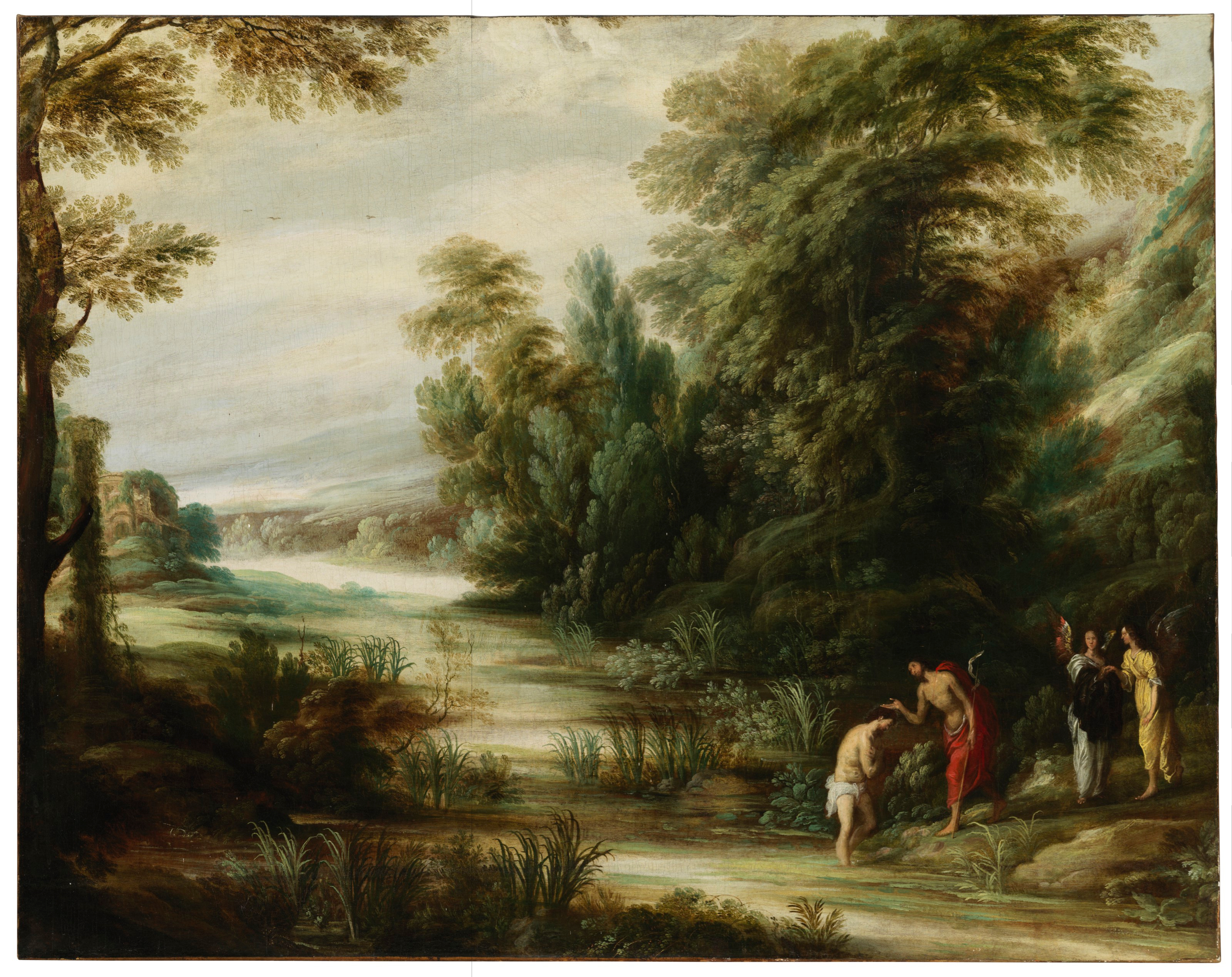
Riverscape with the Baptism of Christ, by Jacques Fouquier

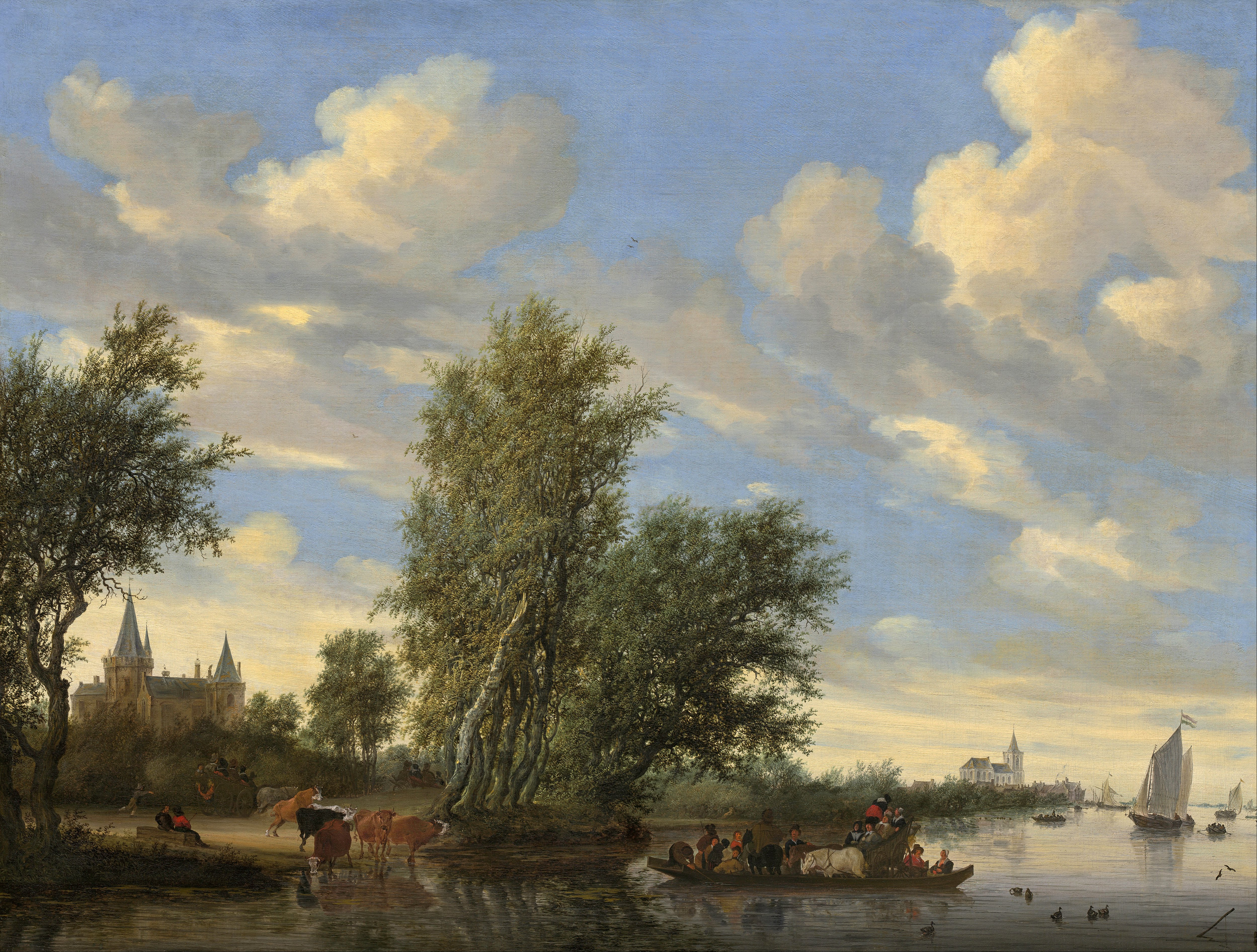
River Landscape with Ferry by Salomon van Ruysdael (1649)

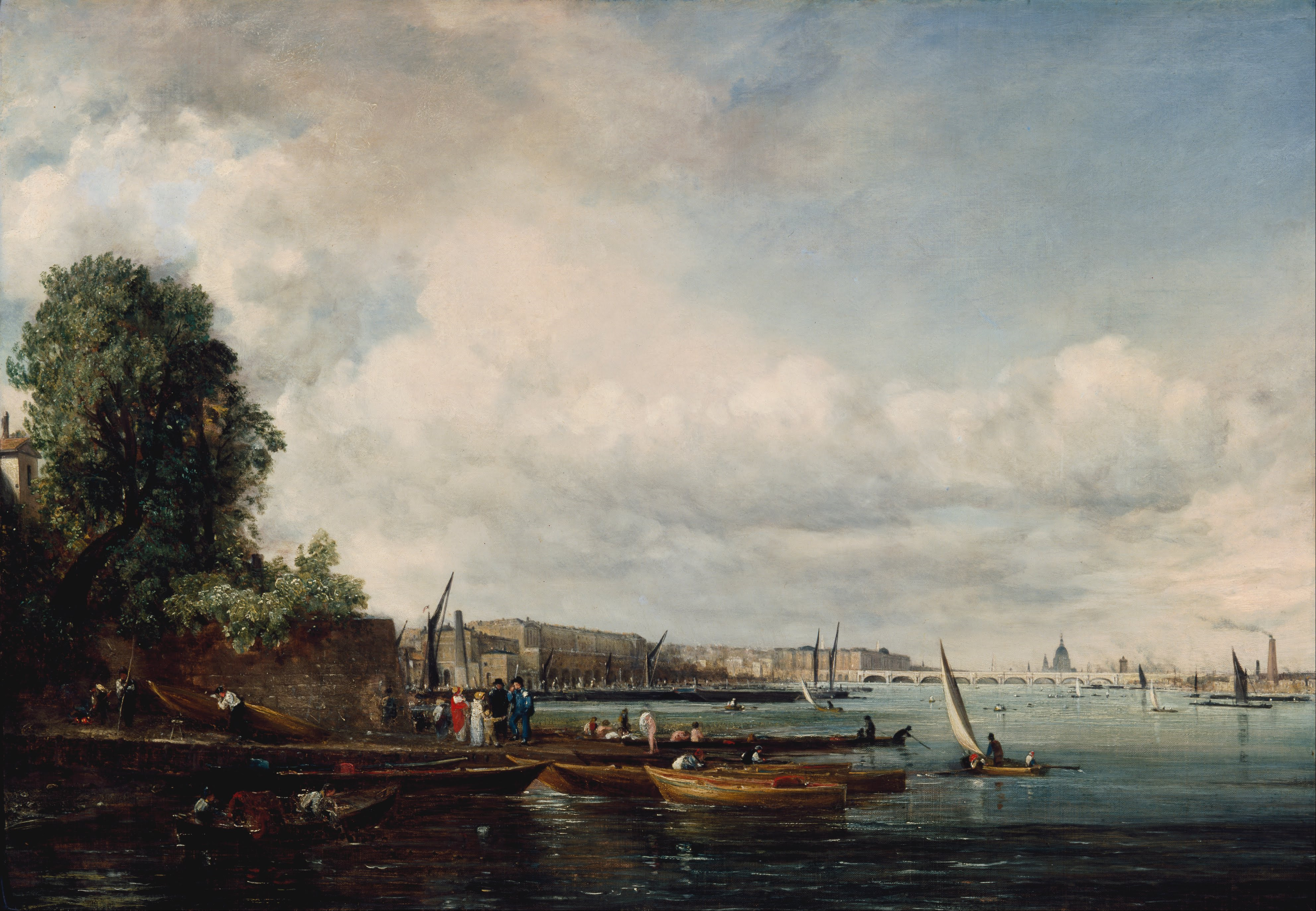
Waterloo Bridge by John Constable (1820)

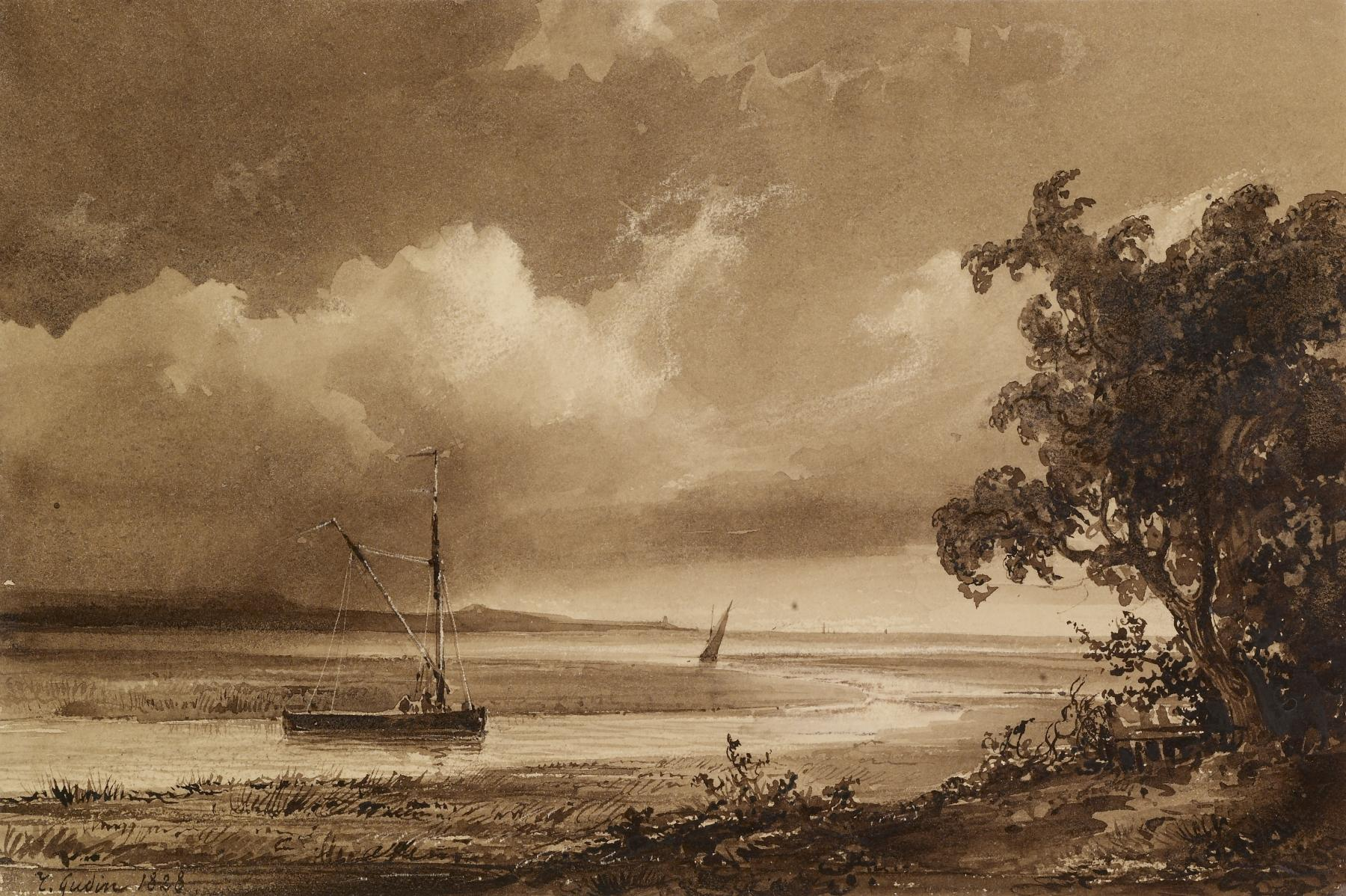
Riverscape with Boats, by Adam August Müller (1828)

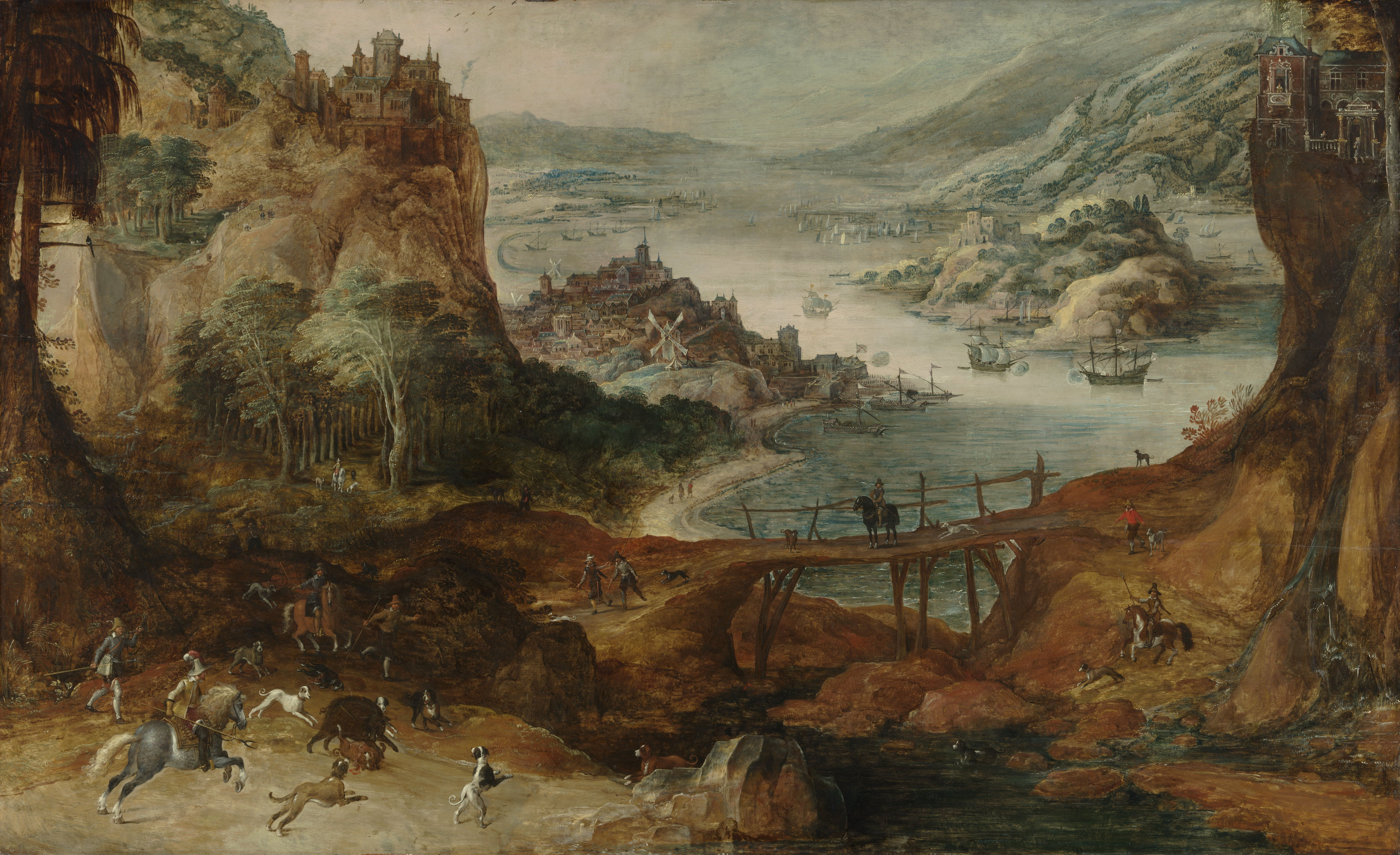
River Landscape with a Boar Hunt, by Joos de Momper (circa 1600)

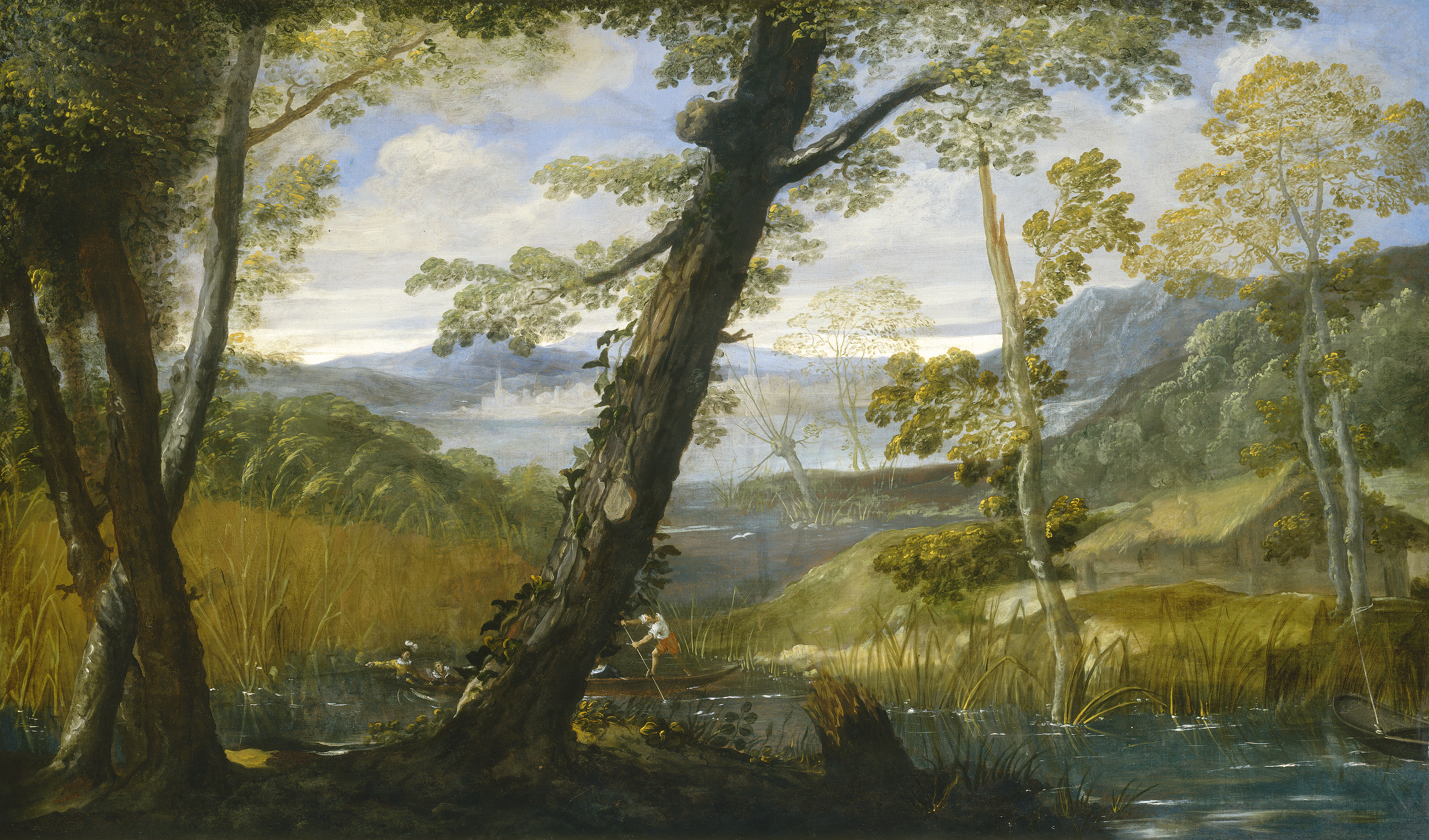
River Landscape, by Annibale Carracci (circa 1590)

== Photo gallery ==
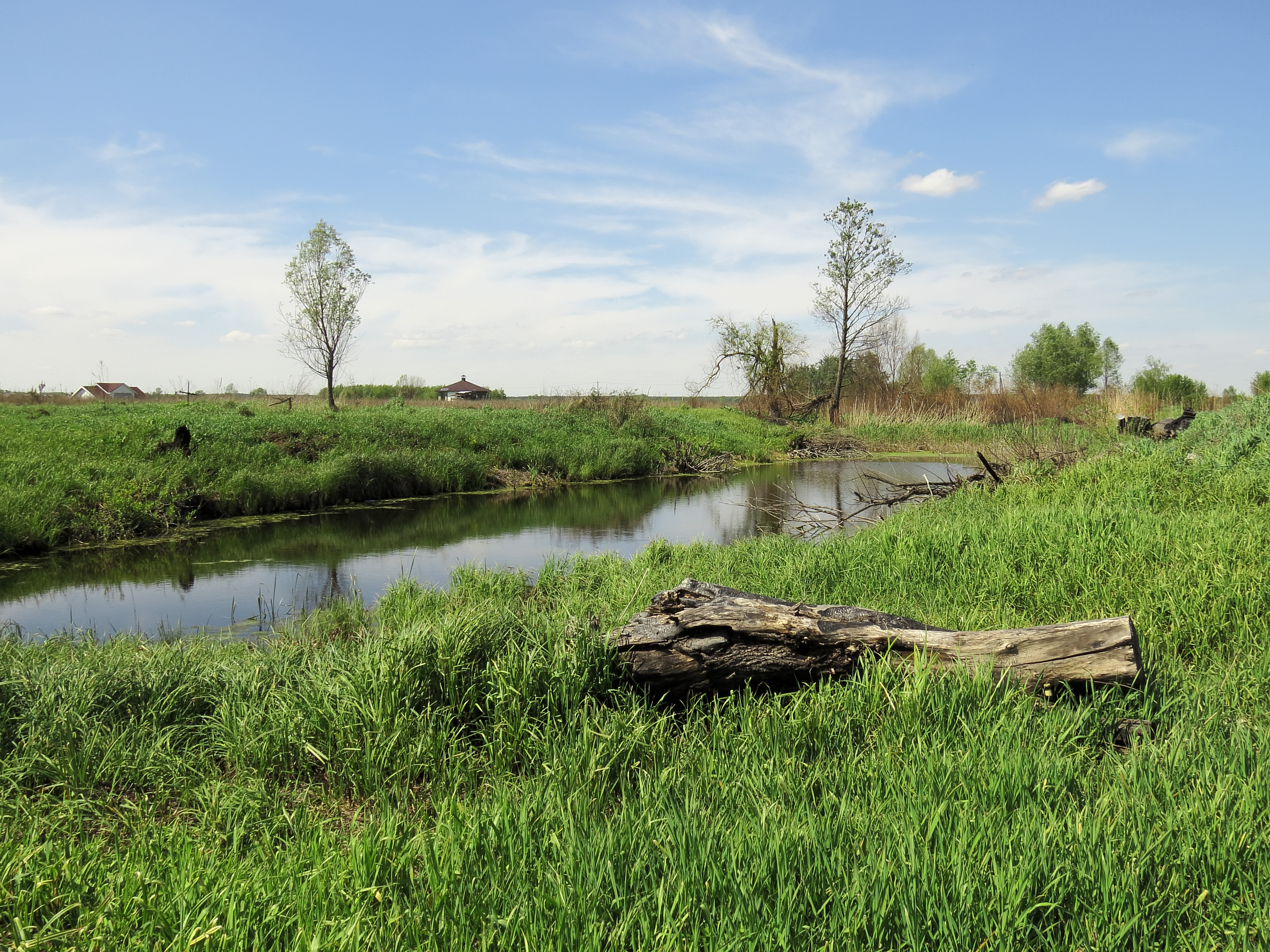
Oxbow lake along the Irpin River (Ukraine)

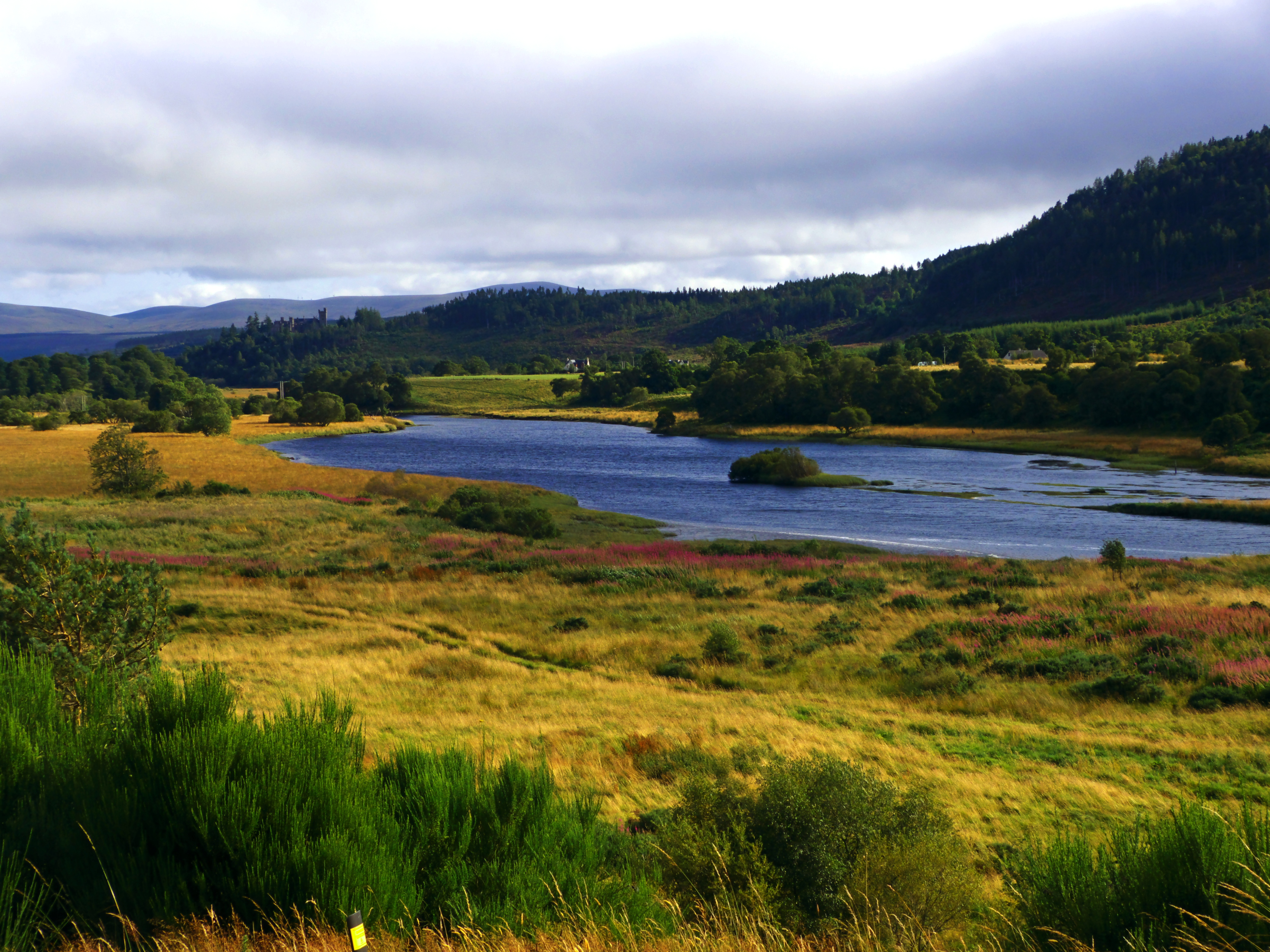
Riverscape of the Kyle of Sutherland (Scotland)

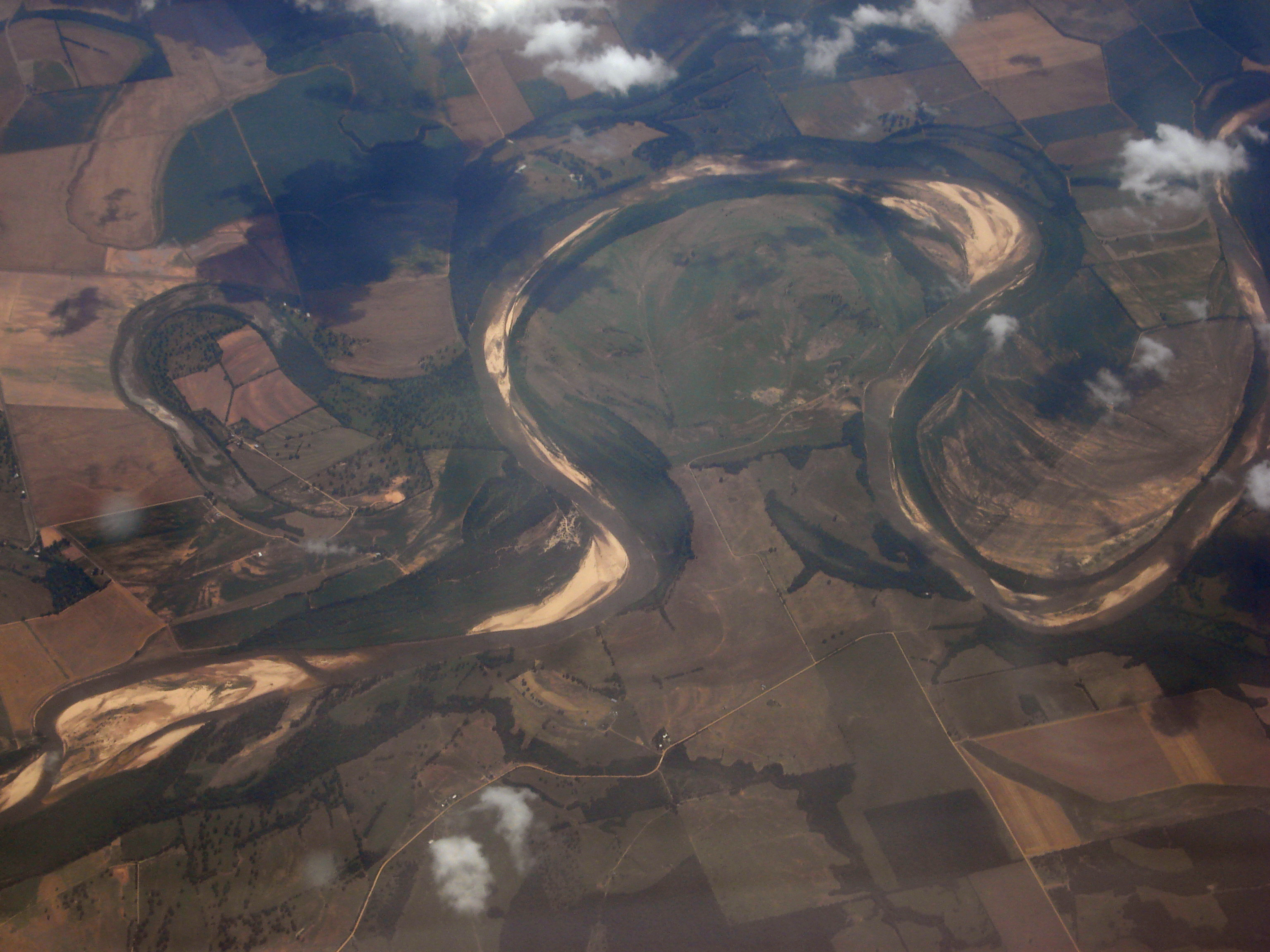
Aerial view of a meander in the Red River (Texas)

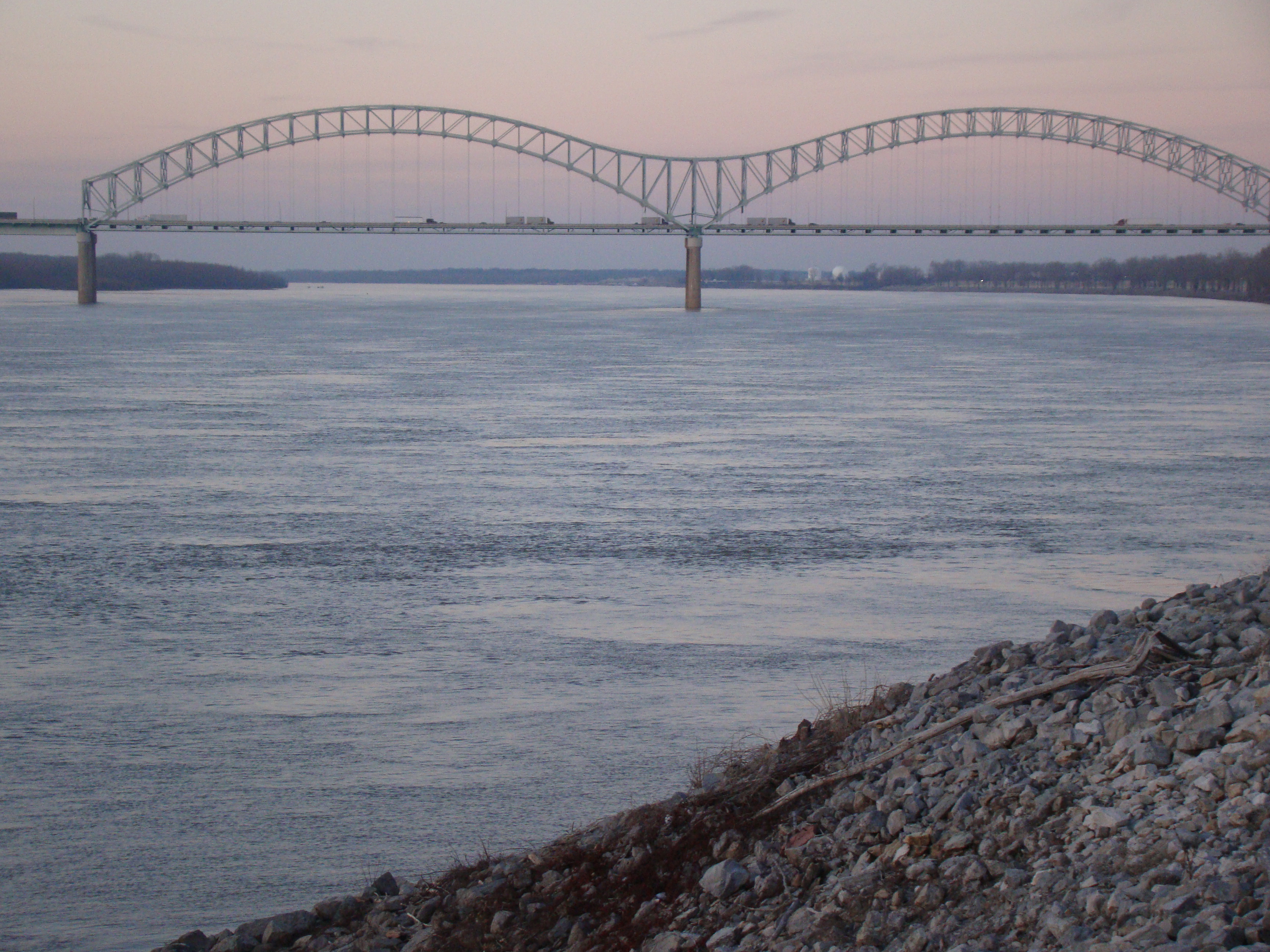
The Mississippi River (Tennessee)

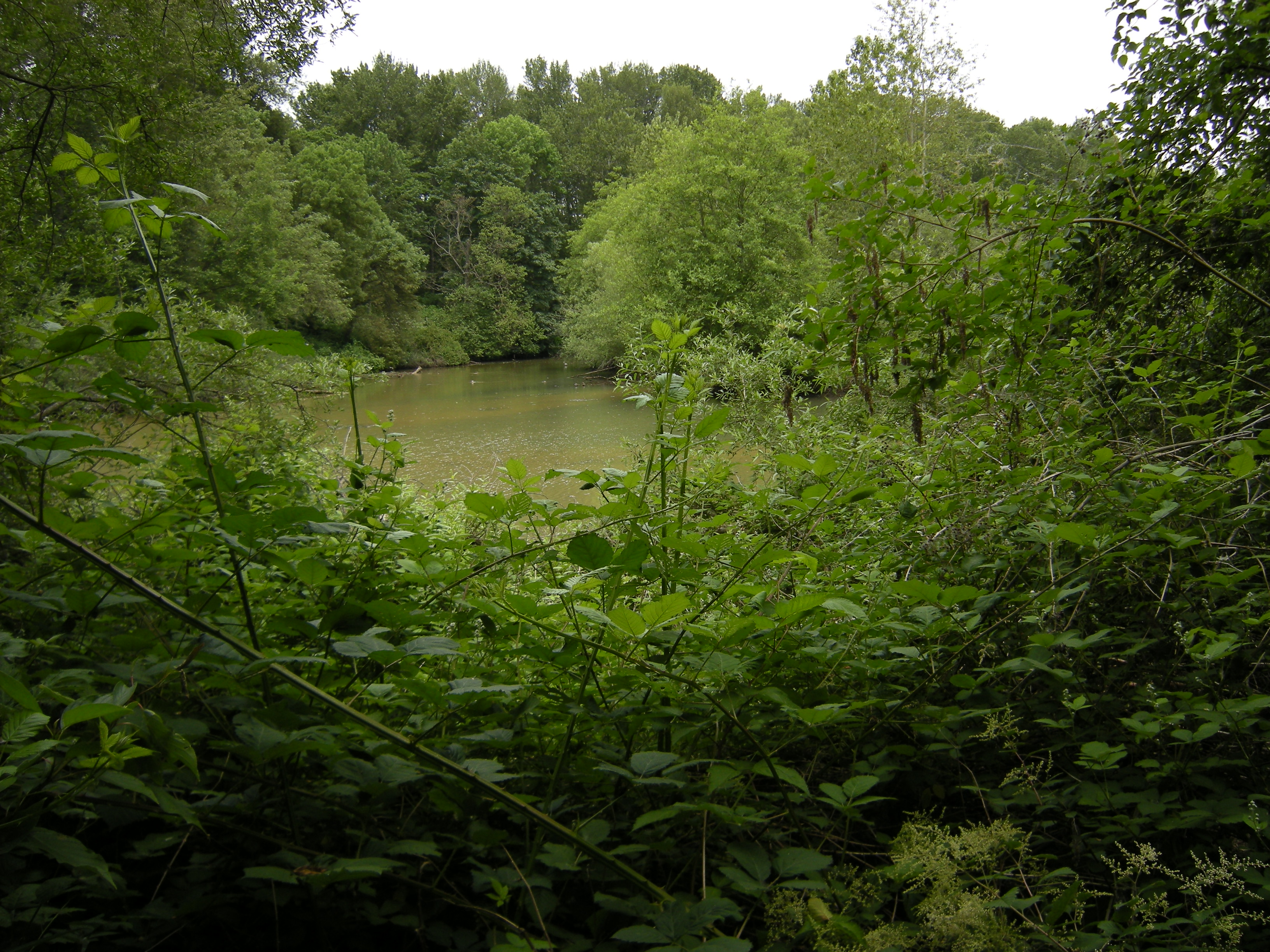
Riparian forest with a remnant of the Black River (Washington)

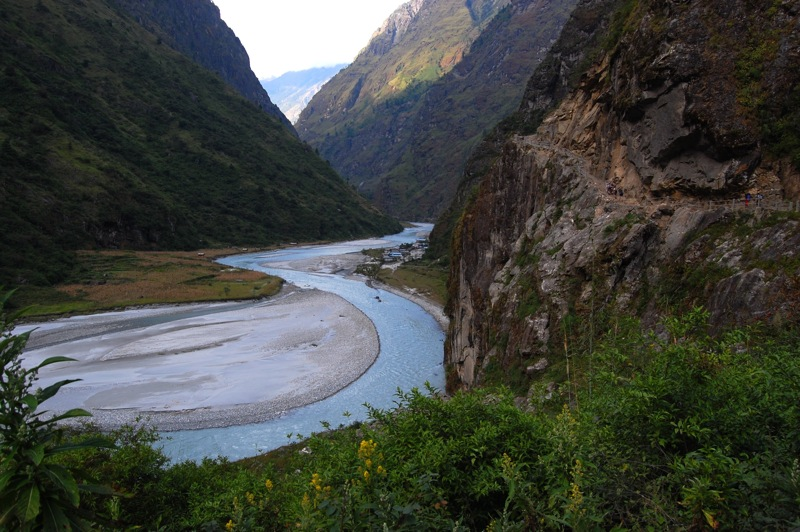
Interlocking spurs along the Marsyangdi River (Nepal)

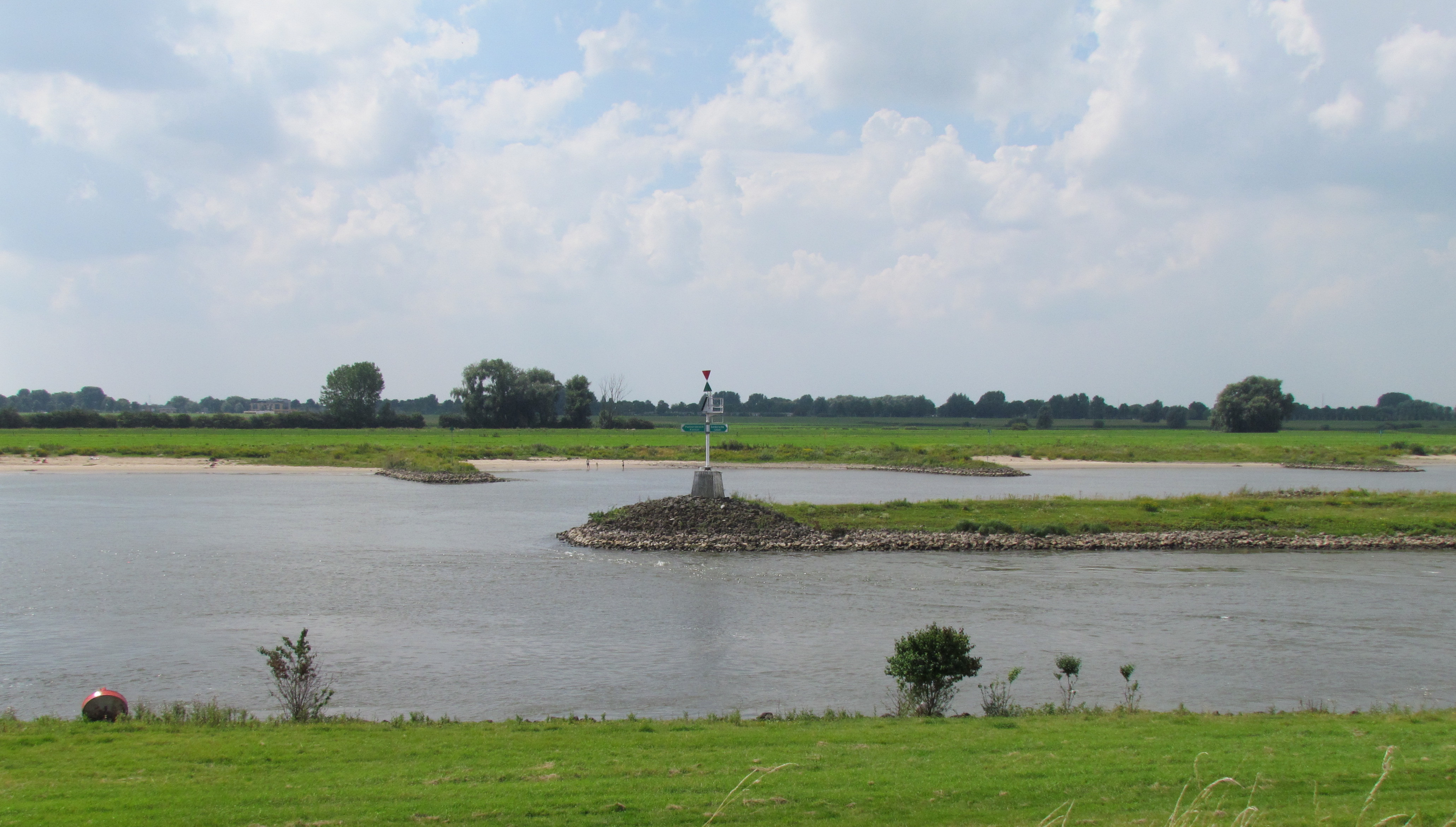
Bifurcation point of the Nederrijn and IJssel (Netherlands)

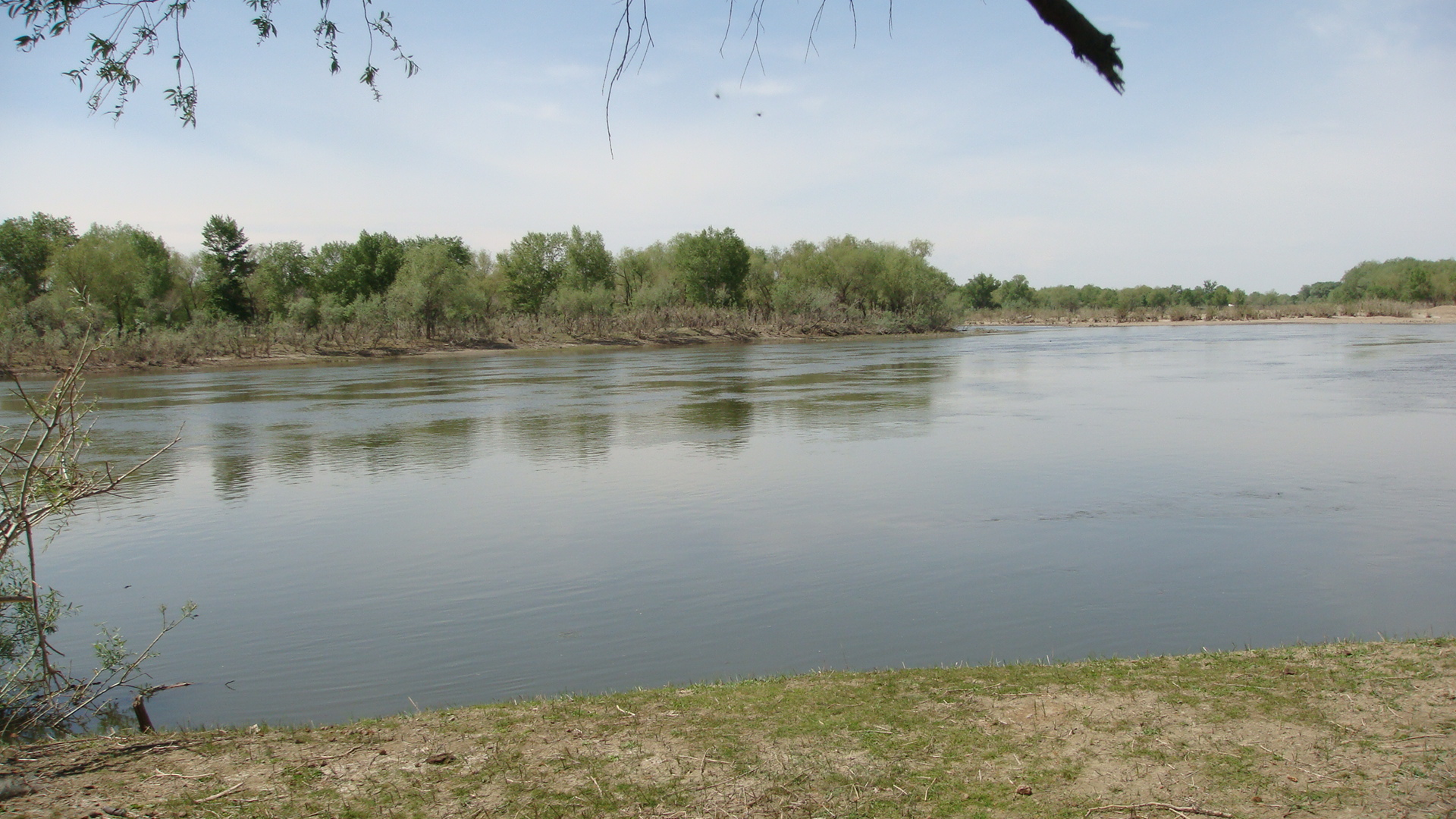
Landscape of the Irtysh River (Xinjiang, China)

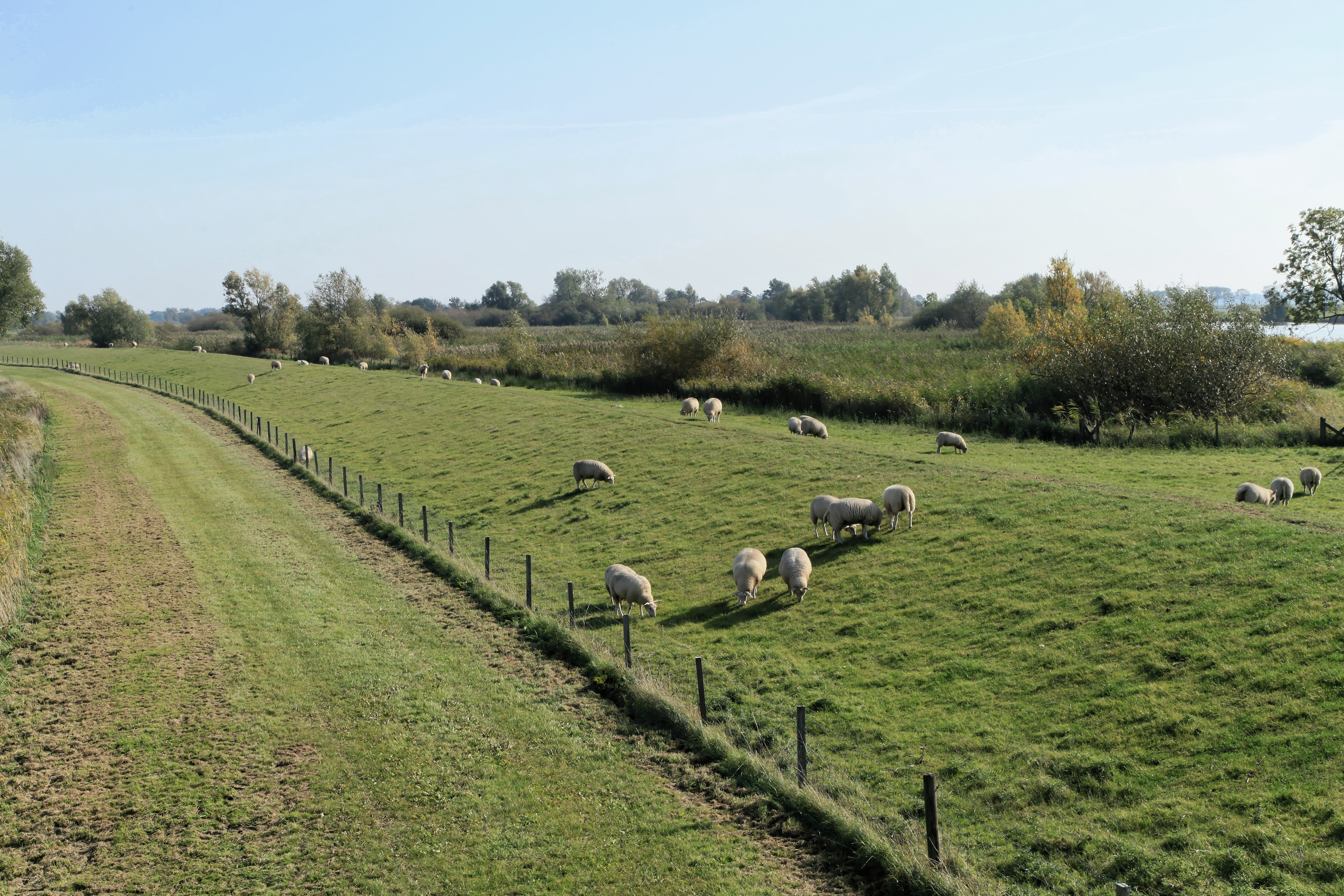
Levee at the Jümme River (Germany)

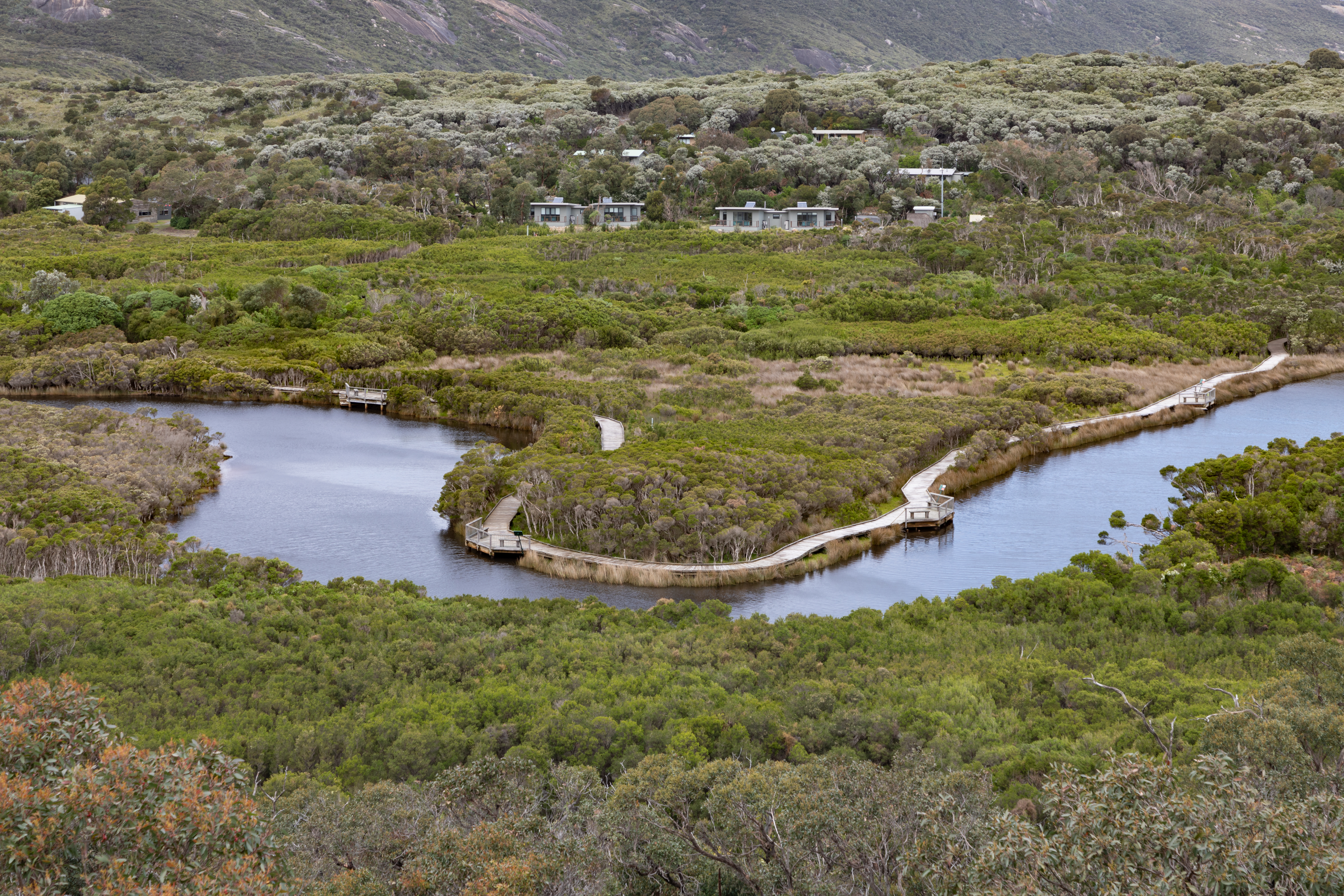
A meander in the Tidal River (Victoria)

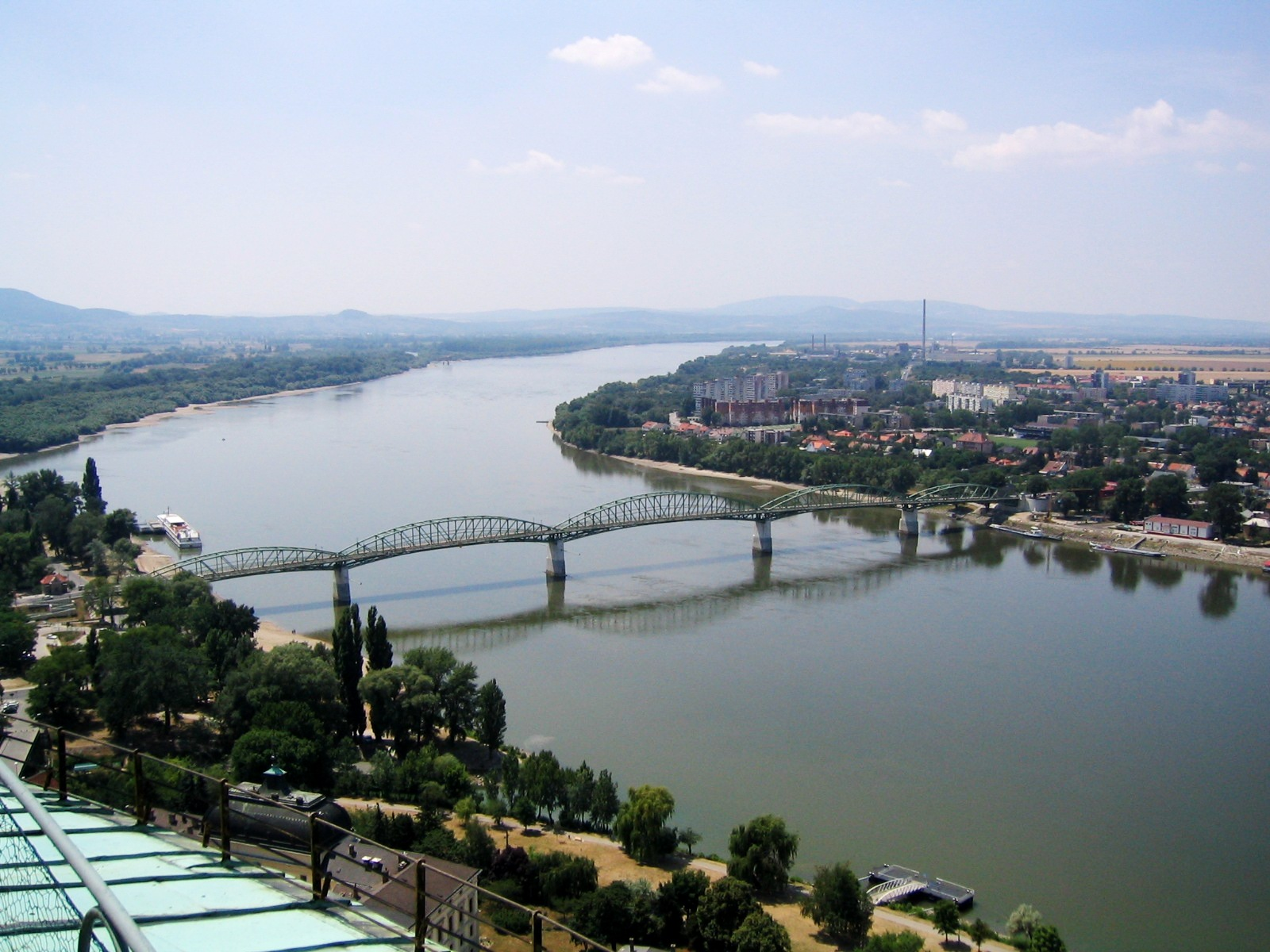
Lower course riverscape of the Danube (Hungary)

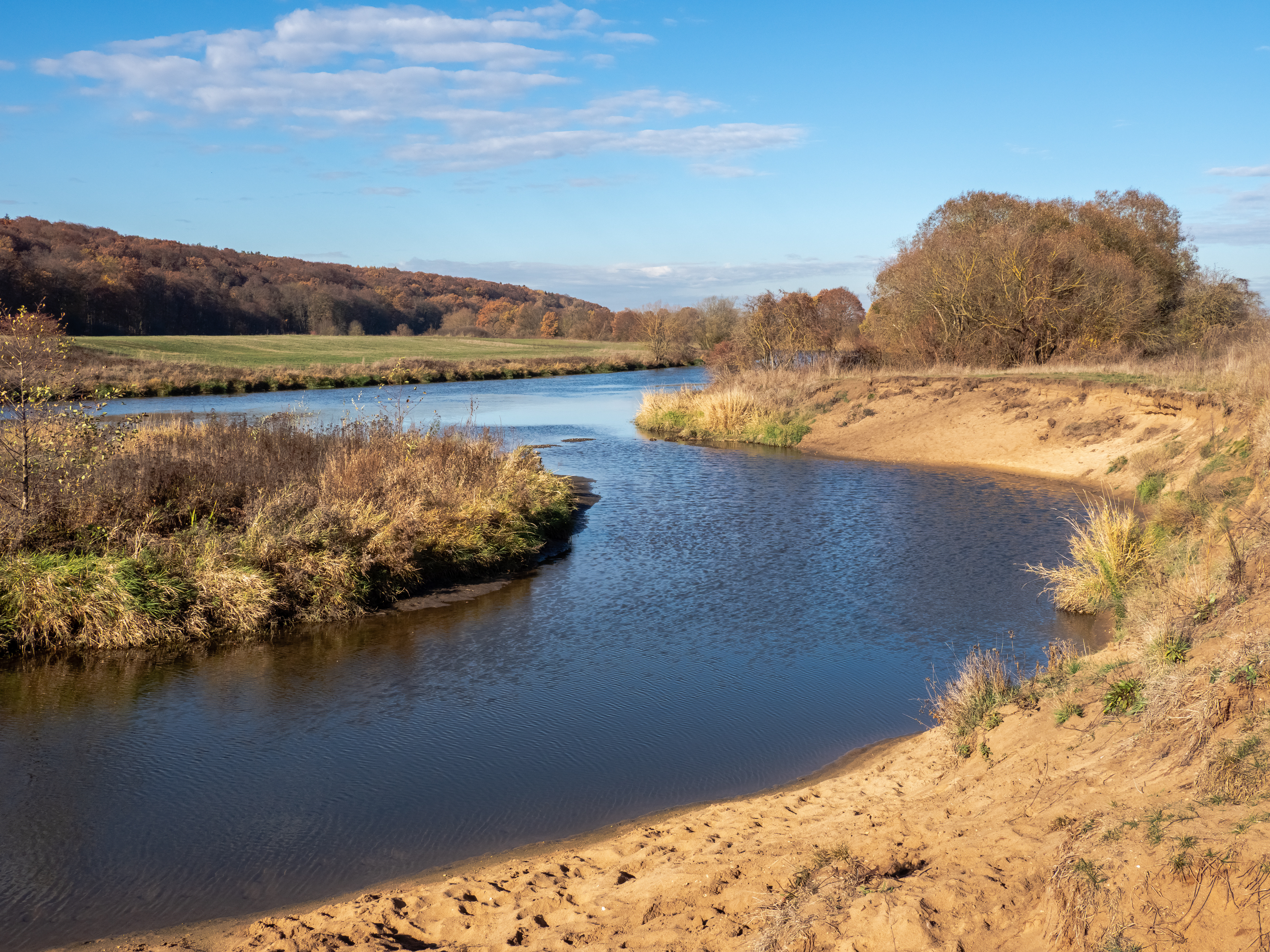
Riverbank of the Regnitz (Germany)

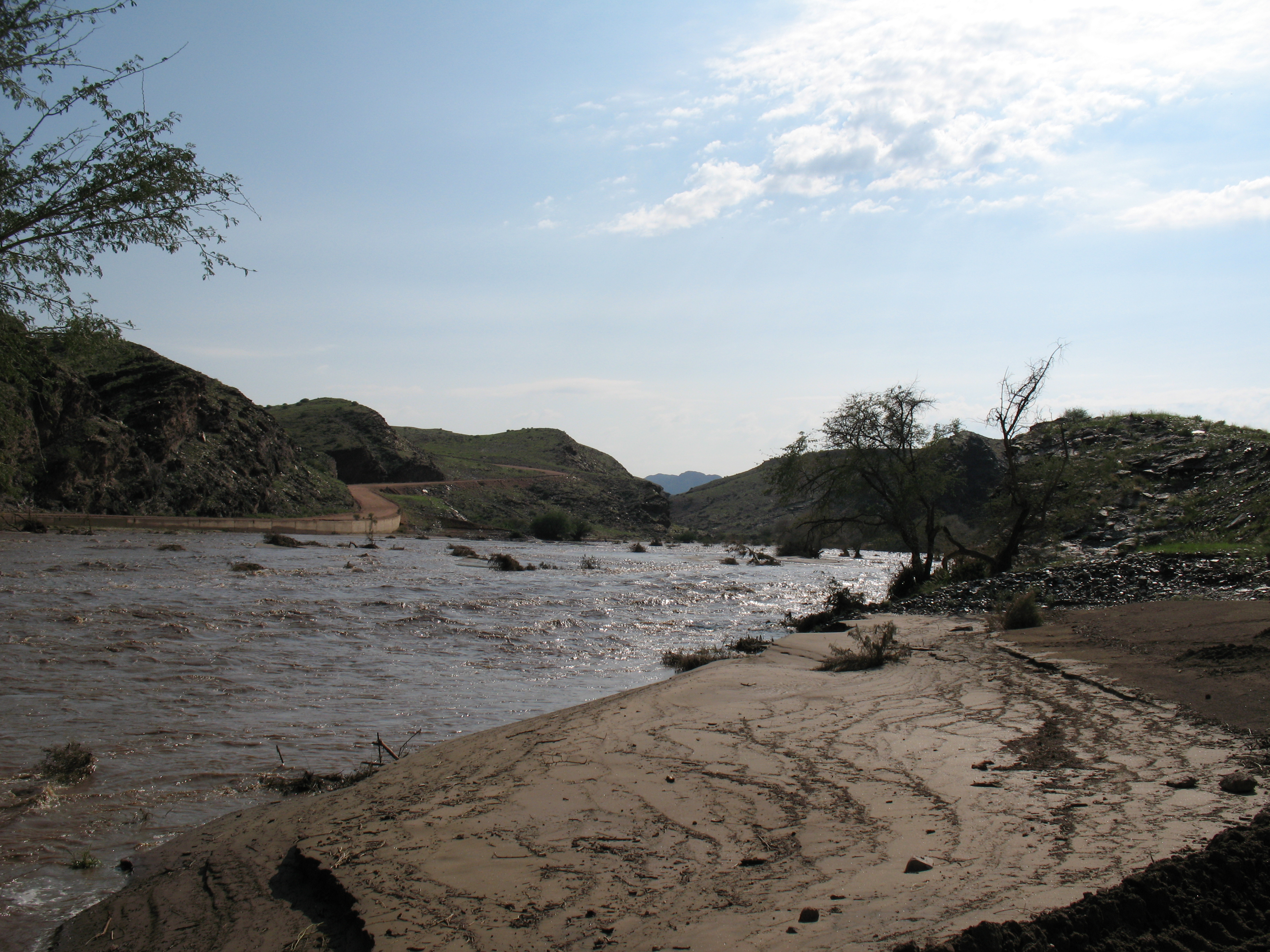
Riverscape of the Kuiseb River (Namibia)

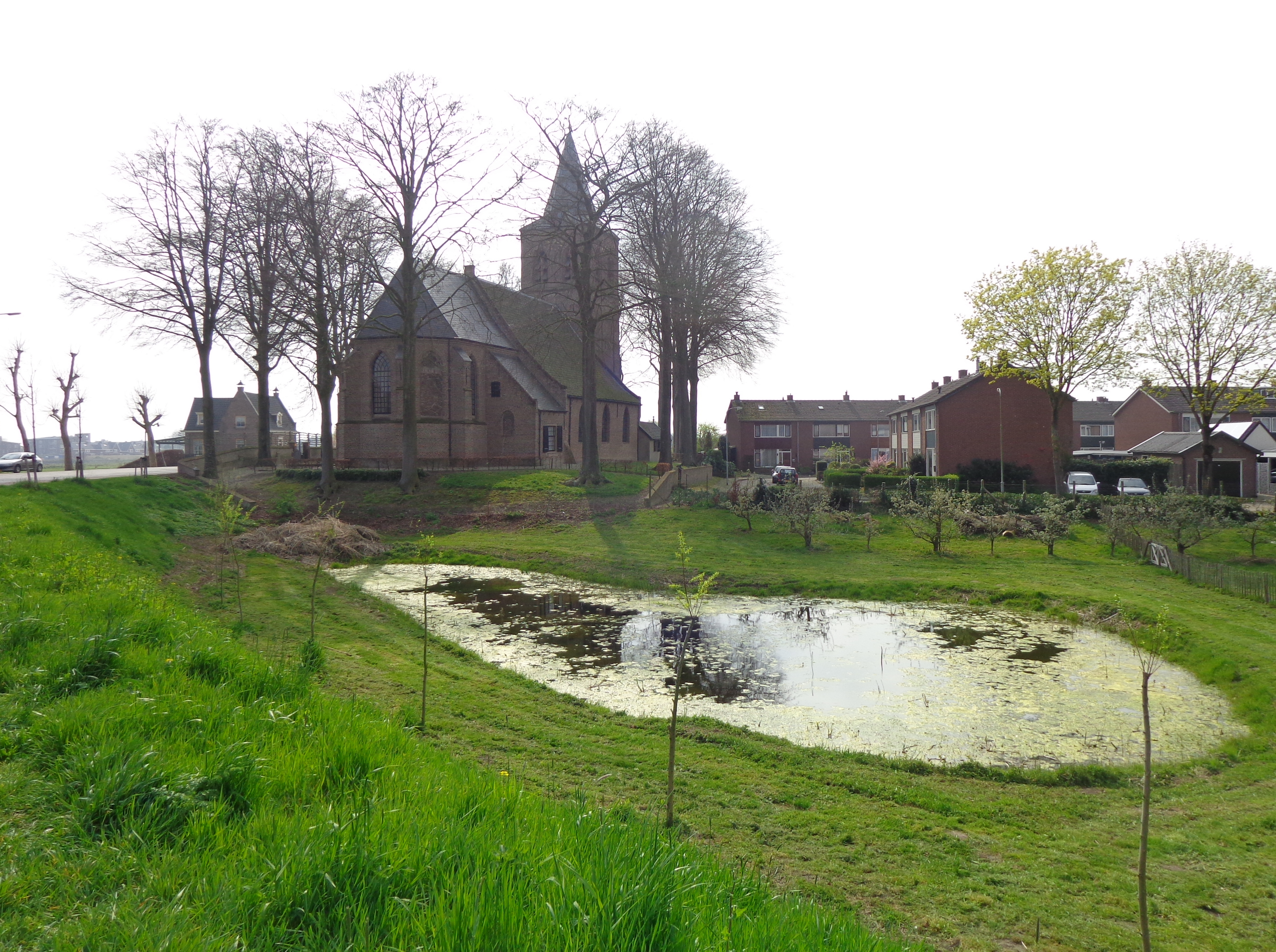
A kolk along the Linge (Netherlands)

== See also ==
- Fluvial processes
- River morphology
- River reclamation
- Riparian buffer
- Riparian zone
- Fresh water
- Canal
