= Waterloo Bridge (Constable) =

Painting by John Constable

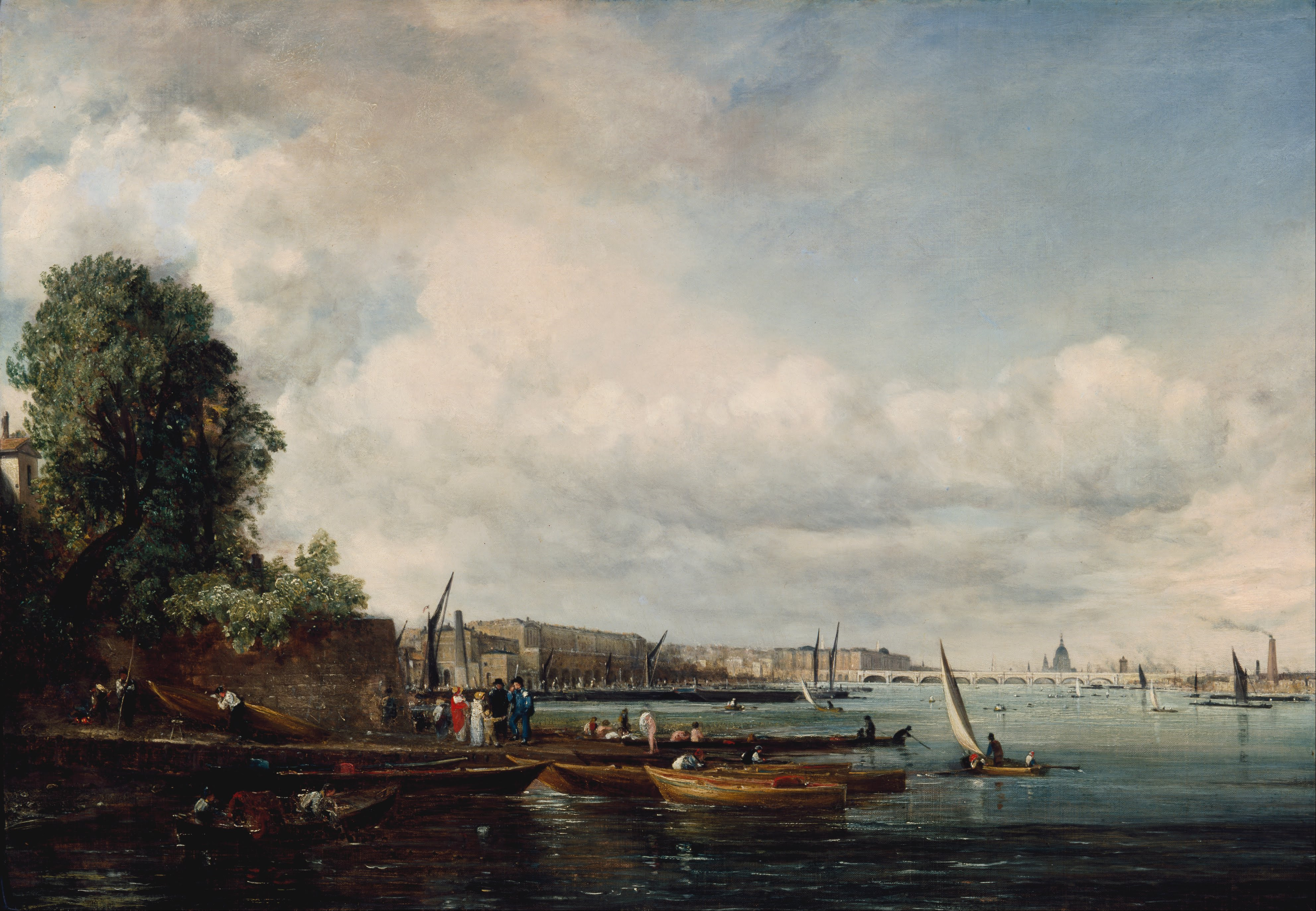
- Artist: John Constable
- Year: 1820
- Type: Oil on canvas, landscape painting
- Dimensions: 55 cm × 78 cm (21.6 in × 30.6 in)
- Location: Cincinnati Art Museum, Cincinnati

Waterloo Bridge is an oil on canvas riverscape painting by the British artist John Constable, from 1820. It depicts a view of London looking eastwards towards Waterloo Bridge, which had opened three years earlier. Also visible are notable other London landmarks including Somerset House and Saint Paul's Cathedral. In the foreground are waterman and bathers. Constable's patron John Fisher described it as Canaletto-like. Constable spent many years working on a major project The Opening of Waterloo Bridge, showing the events of 1817, which was finally displayed at the Royal Academy Exhibition of 1832.

Today it is in the collection of the Cincinnati Art Museum, in Ohio. A smaller version is owned by the Royal Academy of Arts, in London.

== See also ==
- List of paintings by John Constable

== Bibliography ==
- Bailey, Anthony. John Constable: A Kingdom of his Own. Random House, 2012.
- Charles, Victoria. Constable. Parkstone International, 2015.
- Hamilton, James. Constable: A Portrait. Hachette UK, 2022.
- Reynolds, Graham. Constable's England. Metropolitan Museum of Art, 1983.
- Thornes, John E. John Constable's Skies: A Fusion of Art and Science. A&C Black, 1999.
