= River Landscape with a Boar Hunt =

Painting by Joos de Momper (c. 1600)

River Landscape with Boar Hunt
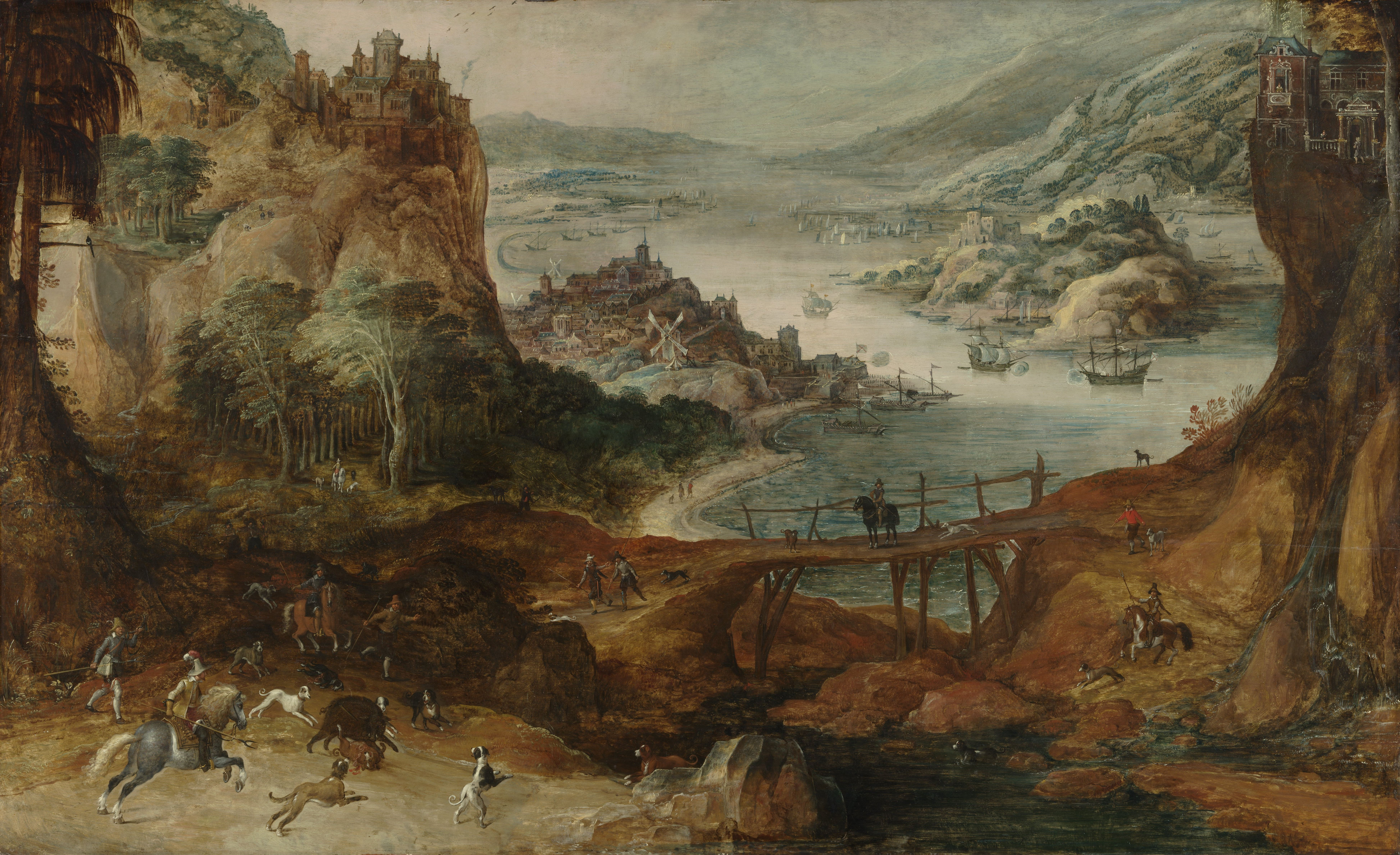
- Artist: Joos de Momper
- Year: c. 1590-1635
- Medium: Oil on panel
- Dimensions: 121 cm × 196.5 cm (48 in × 77.4 in)
- Location: Rijksmuseum, Amsterdam

River Landscape with a Boar Hunt, or Dutch: Rivierlandschap met everzwijnjacht, is a c. 1600 painting by the Flemish artist Joos de Momper, now in the Rijksmuseum, in Amsterdam. The artist uses a high point of view, like in Altdorfer's The Battle of Alexander at Issus (1528–1529) and Brueghel's The Hunters in the Snow (1565). Later, de Momper mostly used a lower point of view, establishing what would become a typical feature of 17th century Dutch and Flemish landscapes, such as Windmill at Wijk bij Duurstede.
