= Interlocking spur =

Fluvial erosion feature

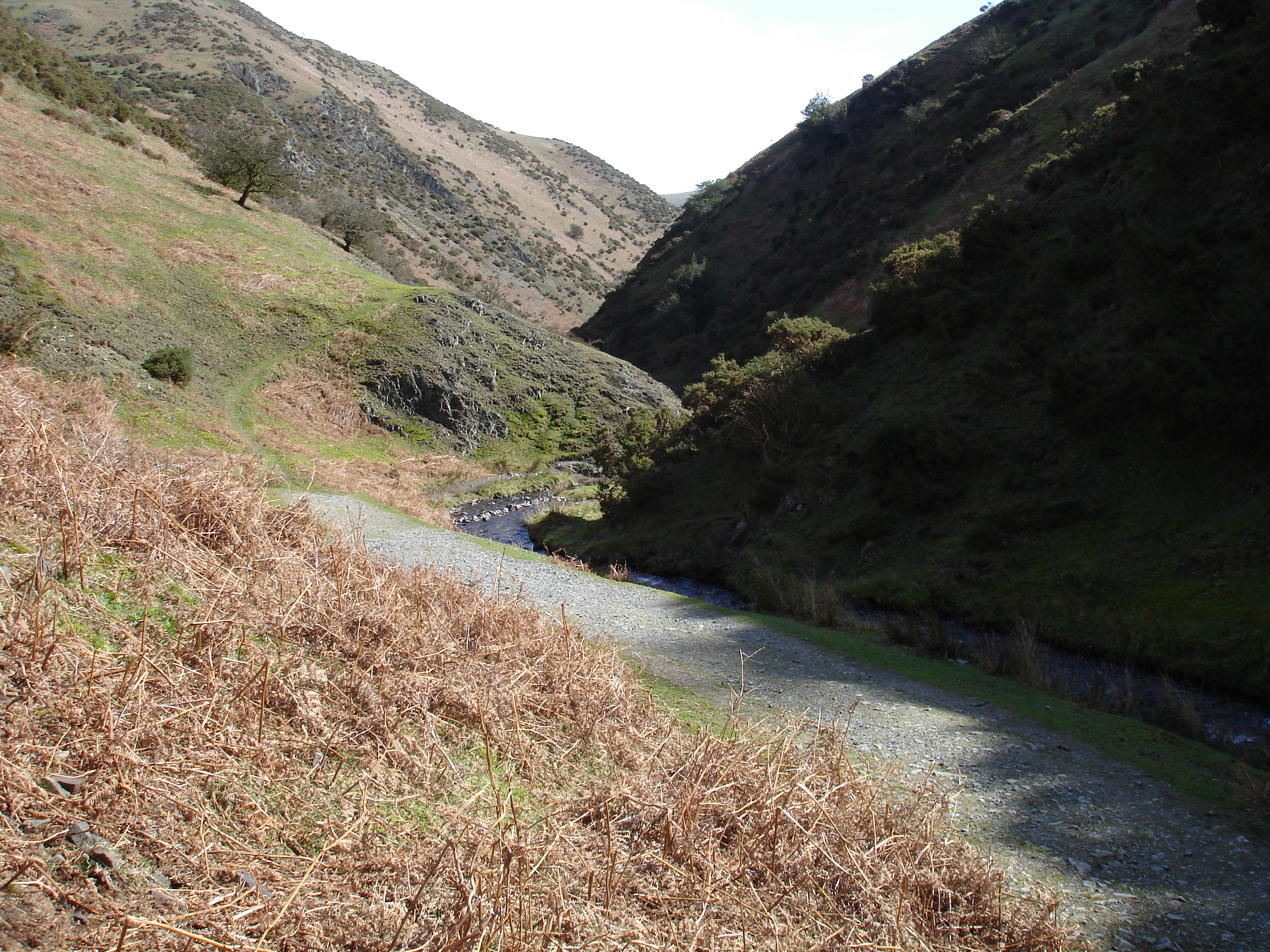
Interlocking spurs at Ashes Hollow, tributary to the River Severn

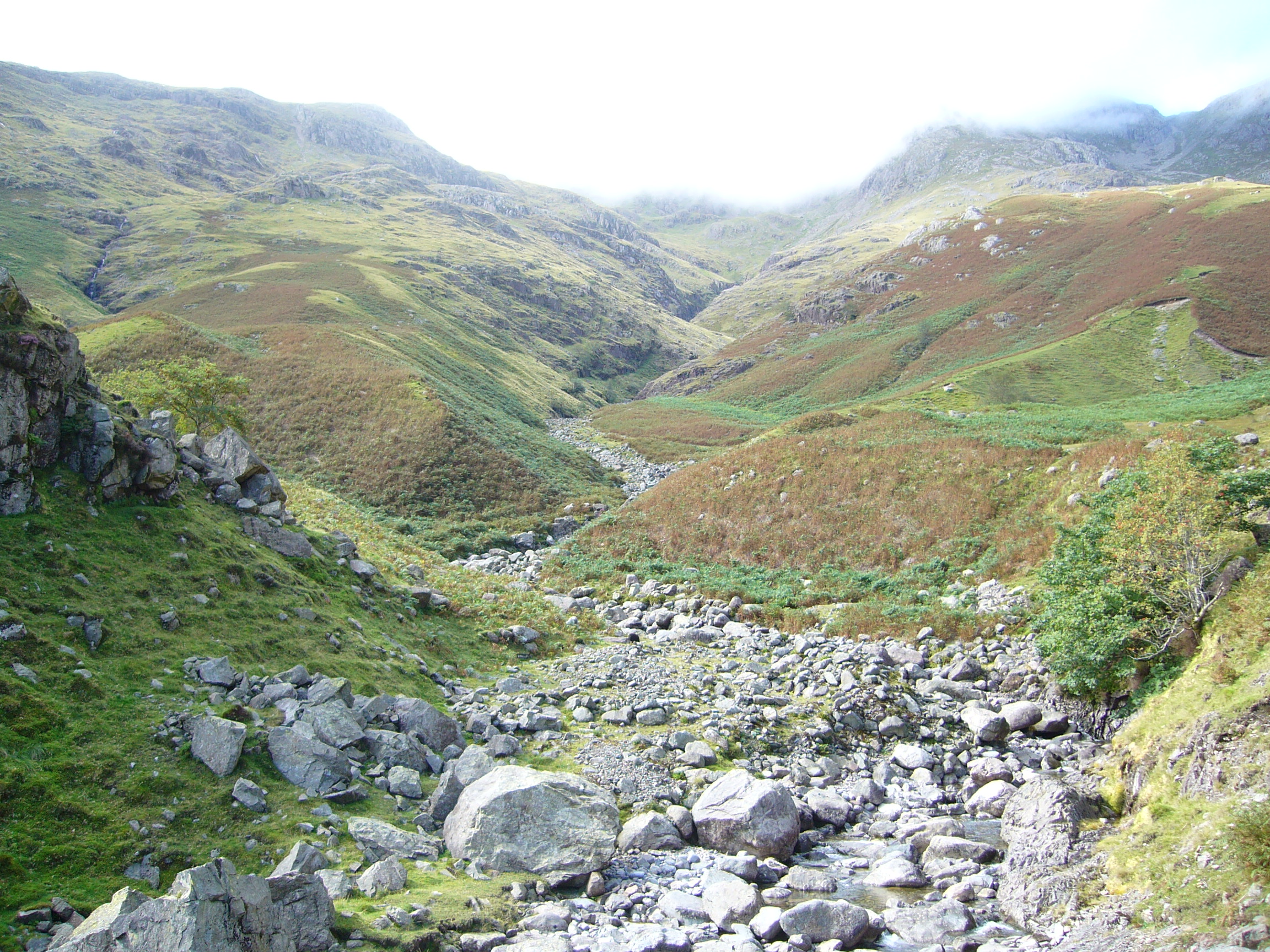
Interlocking spurs looking up Oxendale Beck, tributary to the River Brathay in Lake District, Cumbria

An interlocking spur, also known as an overlapping spur, is one of any number of projecting ridges that extend alternately from the opposite sides of the wall of a young, V-shaped valley down which a river with a winding course flows. Each of these spurs extends laterally into a concave bend of the river such that when viewed either upstream or from overhead, the projecting ridges, which are called spurs, appear to "interlock" or "overlap" in a staggered formation like the teeth of a zipper.

While similar in general appearance, the mechanism behind the formation of interlocking spurs is different from that behind meanders, which arise out of a combination of lateral erosion and deposition. Interlocking spurs are formed as either a river or stream cuts its valley into local bedrock. As it entrenches its valley, it preferentially follows and erodes zones of weaknesses within the bedrock that typically consist of intersecting sets of joints. This process creates a zig-zagging fluvial valley that "interlock" or "overlap" in a staggered manner.

If the river valley is subsequently subject to glaciation, glacial erosion widens the V-shaped valley and removes the ends of the interlock spurs projecting into the valley. As a result, the ridges are truncated to form truncated spurs.
