= John Darwell =

British photographer

John Darwell (born 1955) is a British photographer.

== Life and career ==
Darwell was born in Bolton, Lancashire, in 1955. He has a BA in photography from Manchester Polytechnic, and a PhD from the University of Sunderland. (His thesis was titled A Black Dog Came Calling: A Visualisation of Depression through Contemporary Photography.) He is a Reader in photography at the University of Cumbria.

As a photographer, Darwell "roots himself in neglected landscapes". His early work, published in Working Lives and The Big Ditch, was in black and white, but he moved to colour soon thereafter and has not used black and white since.

Jimmy Jock, Albert and the Six Sided Clock (published in 1993) shows the Liverpool docklands at a time when "the amount of cargo passing through the docks" was higher than ever before, but when, thanks to mechanization, everything was run by fewer than 600 men, down from over 20,000.

For three weeks in late 1999, Darwell photographed within the Chernobyl Exclusion Zone: Pripyat, numerous villages, a landfill site, and people continuing to live within the Zone. This resulted in an exhibition and book titled Legacy.

The first pyre intended to check the British outbreak of foot-and-mouth disease in early 2001 took place very close to Darwell's house in Cumbria. Darwell devoted a year to photographing this and its aftermath; the resulting book, Dark Days, "catalogues the destruction that consumed local farming communities and shut Cumbria off from the outside world".

DDSBs: Discarded Dog Sh*t Bags shows "a typology of discarded plastic bags containing dog muck", photographs Darwell presents "as evidence of our half-hearted commitment to the ecological cause".

=== Books by Darwell ===
- Working Lives. Stockport, Ches.: Stockport Museums and Gallery Service, 1986. ISBN 0-905164-36-9. With a foreword by John Baker, an introduction by Frank Galvin, and additional photographs from the Stockport Museum archive.
- The Big Ditch: The Manchester Ship Canal Seen through the Camera of John Darwell. Chorley, Lancs: Countryside Publications, 1987. ISBN 0-86157-250-5. Photographs of the Manchester Ship Canal.
- Jimmy Jock, Albert and the Six Sided Clock. Manchester: Cornerhouse, 1993. ISBN 978-0-948797-62-0. Photographs of the Port of Liverpool.
- Legacy: Photographs inside the Chernobyl Exclusion Zone. Stockport: Dewi Lewis, 2001. ISBN 978-1-899235-58-2. (Note: Dewi Lewis's page about the two books by John Darwell it has published is here.)
- Dark Days. Stockport: Dewi Lewis, 2007. ISBN 978-1-904587-42-2. With essays by Liz Wells, Roger Breeze, David Black and Alison Nordström.
- Committed to Memory. Carlisle, Cumbria: Tullie House Museum and Art Gallery, 2007. ISBN 0-907852-17-3. With an introduction by Paul Herrmann and an essay by Simon Grennan.
- DDSBs: Discarded Dog Sh*t Bags. Self-published / mynewtpress, 2013. Edition of 200 copies. (Note: The photographer/publisher's information about this is here.) (Note: The book is presented here by Josef Chladek.) `

=== Booklets and zines by Darwell ===
- (h)arris: Images from the Western Isles. Democratic Book no. 9. Cologne: Democratic Books, 2004. A PDF that is freely downloadable from the publisher's website. (Note: The publisher's website: democraticbooks.org. If this is unavailable, the PDF remains available from here, as archived on 13 July 2006 by the Wayback Machine.)
- Sheffield: Tinsley Viaduct. Southport, Merseyside: Café Royal Books, 2013. (Note: Café Royal Books' page about Sheffield: Tinsley Viaduct is here.)
- Sheffield: Meadowhall, Hyde Park, Ponds Forge. Southport, Merseyside: Café Royal Books, 2013. (Note: Café Royal Books' page about Sheffield: Meadowhall, Hyde Park, Ponds Forge is here.)
- Grangemouth and the Forth Estuary. Southport, Merseyside: Café Royal Books, 2014. (Note: Café Royal Books' page about Grangemouth and the Forth Estuary is here.)
- Desert States: Photographs from New Mexico, Arizona, Utah and Nevada. Chronicles no. 6. Part of Chronicles set 2. Taipei: The Velvet Cell, 2014. (Note: The Velvet Cell's page about Chronicles set 2, including Desert States, was archived here by the Wayback Machine on 12 July 2014.)
- Chernobyl. Vol 1. Chronicles no. 13. Taipei: The Velvet Cell, 2014. (Note: The Velvet Cell's page about Chronicles set 3, including Desert States, was archived here by the Wayback Machine on 23 August 2014.)
- Chernobyl. Vol 2. Chronicles no. 14. Taipei: The Velvet Cell, 2014.
- Sheffield: Things Seen whilst Wandering around Attercliffe. Southport, Merseyside: Café Royal Books, 2014. (Note: Café Royal Books' page about Sheffield: Things Seen whilst Wandering around Attercliffe is here.)
- Sheffield: The Remains of Some Buildings around the Don Valley. Southport, Merseyside: Café Royal Books, 2014. (Note: Café Royal Books' page about Sheffield: The Remains of Some Buildings around the Don Valley is here.)
- Sheffield: In Transition. Southport, Merseyside: Café Royal Books, 2014. (Note: Café Royal Books' page about Sheffield in Transition is here.)
- The Dark River: Bolton — Farnworth. Southport, Merseyside: Café Royal Books, 2015. Edition of 150 copies. (Note: Café Royal Books' page about The Dark River: Bolton — Farnworth is here.)
- The Dark River: Kearsley — Clifton. Southport, Merseyside: Café Royal Books, 2015. Edition of 150 copies. (Note: Café Royal Books' page about The Dark River: Kearsley — Clifton is here.)
- The Dark River: Kearsley Power Station. Southport, Merseyside: Café Royal Books, 2016. Edition of 150 copies. (Note: Café Royal Books' page about The Dark River: Kearsley Power Station is here.)
- The Dark River: Clifton — Death Valley — Agecroft. Southport, Merseyside: Café Royal Books, 2016. Edition of 150 copies. (Note: Café Royal Books' page about The Dark River: Clifton — Death Valley — Agecroft is here.)
- The Dark River: Agecroft — Salford. Southport, Merseyside: Café Royal Books, 2016. Edition of 150 copies. Some copies are accompanied by a separate essay by Paul Herrmann, "Reflections on Dark River." (Note: Café Royal Books' page about The Dark River: Agecroft — Salford is here.)

== Solo exhibitions ==
- Cityscapes. Brewery Arts Centre, Kendal, Cumbria, 1984.
- Landscapes. Stockport Art Gallery, Stockport, 1984.
- Working Lives. Stockport Art Gallery, Stockport; Side Gallery, Newcastle upon Tyne, 1986. Bonnington Gallery, Trent Polytechnic, Nottingham, 1987.
- The Big Ditch. Viewpoint Gallery, Salford, Manchester, 1986.
- Regeneration. Untitled Gallery, Sheffield, 1989.
- Borderland. Manor Gallery, Carlisle, Cumbria, 1989.
- The Big Ditch. Blackburn Museum and Art Gallery, Blackburn; Merseyside Maritime Museum, Liverpool, 1990. Castle Park Arts Centre, Frodsham, Cheshire, 1991. Calderdale Industrial Museum, Halifax, Yorkshire; Manor Gallery, Carlisle, 1992. Williamson Art Gallery, Birkenhead, 1993. Duncan of Jordanstone Gallery, Dundee, 1994.
- Jimmy Jock, Albert and the Six Sided Clock. Merseyside Maritime Museum, Liverpool. May–September 1993. Fotonoviembre, Centro de Fotografía Isla de Tenerife, 1995.
- Scratching the Surface. Tullie House Museum and Art Gallery, Carlisle, 1994.
- Workplace. Durham Art Gallery, Durham, 1996.
- In Isolation. Euston railway station escalators, London, 1996.
- Where it all began. Centro Colombo Americano, Medellín, Colombia, 1996.
- By Association. Mill Gallery, Carlisle, 1997. Landscapes associated with nuclear testing and energy generation.
- First and Last. Viewpoint Gallery, Salford, 1997. Rituals in Japan to commemorate the atomic bombs.
- By Association. Folly Gallery, Lancaster; Tom Blau Gallery, London, 2001
- Legacy. Tullie House Museum and Art Gallery, Carlisle, 2001.
- Consequences. Gallery Oldham, 2002.
- After Schwitters – Kurt Schwitters and the Merzbarn Conference. Cumbria, 2003.
- h)arris. Installation sited at 15 rail stations along Cumbrian Coast Line, 2004.
- A Black Dog Came Calling and Melancholy Objects. Institute of Psychiatry Gallery, King's College London. November 2005 – February 2006.
- Committed to Memory. Tullie House Museum and Art Gallery, Carlisle. May–July 2007.
- Working Lives. Stockport Art Gallery, February–March 2011. Darwell's photographs from 1985.
- Dogs in Cages. Look 11 International Photography Festival, Confined. The Bluecoat, Liverpool, May–July 2011.
- After Schwitters. Hatton Gallery, University of Newcastle. February–April 2013.

== Public collections ==
- Victoria and Albert Museum, London
- King's College / Maudsley Hospital Trust, London
- British Film Institute, London
- Site Gallery, Sheffield
- National Media Museum / Sun Life Collection, Bradford
- Merseyside Maritime Museum, Liverpool
- Tullie House Museum and Art Gallery, Carlisle
- Manchester Art Gallery
- Arts Council North West, Manchester
- Stockport Art Gallery, Stockport
- Viewpoint Gallery, Salford
- Metropolitan Museum of Art, New York
- Centro de Fotografía Isla de Tenerife
