= Tenerife Espacio de las Artes =

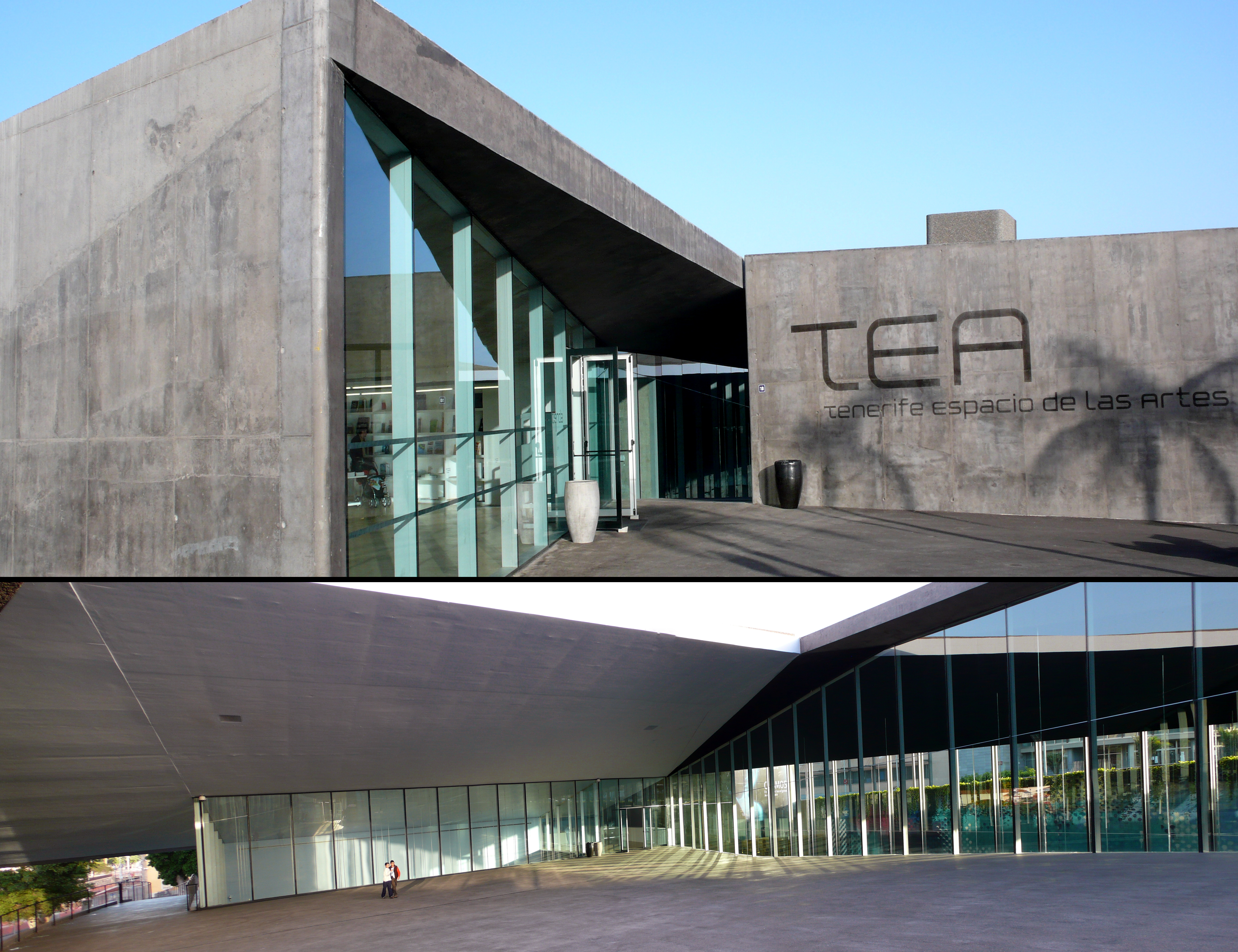

- Location within Tenerife

General information
- Location: Santa Cruz de Tenerife, Canary Islands, Spain
- Coordinates: 28°27′51″N 16°15′05″W
- Opened: 31 October 2008
- Owner: Cabildo de Tenerife

Design and construction
- Architects: Herzog & de Meuron; Virgilio Gutierrez

Website
- http://www.teatenerife.com/

The Tenerife Arts Space (Spanish: Tenerife Espacio de las Artes, TEA) is a cultural space and building in Santa Cruz de Tenerife, Tenerife, Spain. Opened in 2008, it was designed by Herzog & de Meuron and Virgilio Gutierrez. It houses a permanent exhibition of the works of Óscar Domínguez, as well as the Biblioteca Municipal de Santa Cruz de Tenerife, and the Centro de Fotografía Isla de Tenerife. It is operated by the Cabildo de Tenerife.

== Location ==
TEA is located in Santa Cruz's old town, adjacent to the Santos ravine. It is next to the Museo de la Naturaleza y Arqueología, near to the Nuestra Señora de Africa market and the Iglesia de la Concepción (Church of the Conception).

== Building ==
The building was designed by the Swiss firm of architects Herzog & de Meuron and the Canary architect Virgilio Gutierrez. It is made of concrete, with 1,200 glass windows with 720 different sizes and shapes. A ramp leads to a central courtyard, surrounded by different parts of the building. The building opened on 31 October 2008. It has an area of approximately 20,622 square metres (221,970 sq ft), and has an event hall, a shop and cafeteria, a part-covered plaza, and two exhibition halls, one containing a permanent exhibition, the other containing temporary exhibitions.

== Contents ==
The building houses a permanent exhibition of work by the Tenerife artist Óscar Domínguez. It also houses the Biblioteca Municipal de Santa Cruz de Tenerife, and the Centro de Fotografía Isla de Tenerife (Center for Photography Island of Tenerife). It is operated by the Cabildo de Tenerife.

== The Collection ==
The permanent collection that the TEA has today is based on a selection of works by the surrealist painter, a native of the island of Tenerife, Óscar Domínguez. The founding nucleus of the collection is based on the acquisitions made by the artistic space from the Óscar Domínguez Institute, the Cabildo de Tenerife and those of the Centro de Fotografía Isla de Tenerife. Likewise, deposits from private and public collectors and the acquisitions policy of the entity itself endorsed by a commission of experts for acquisitions are added. In addition, since the opening of the institution on October 31, 2008, the TEA has had temporary exhibitions by various artists such as Tatsumi Orimoto, Roland Penrose, Juan Hidalgo, Patti Smith, Angèle Etoundi Essamba, Alexis W., Thomas Ruff, Carlos Schwartz, Pablo Picasso, Juan Gopar, Teo Sabando, Fernando Álamo, Pedro Garhel, Isabel Flores, Stipo Pranyko, Oliver Behrmann, Regina José Galindo, Arnulf Rainer, Franz Roh, Alecio de Andrade, Clemente Bernad, Arnold Haukeland, José Carlos Cataño or Eberhard Bosslet. They have also been able to exhibit many more artists throughout this time collectively in the halls of the center.

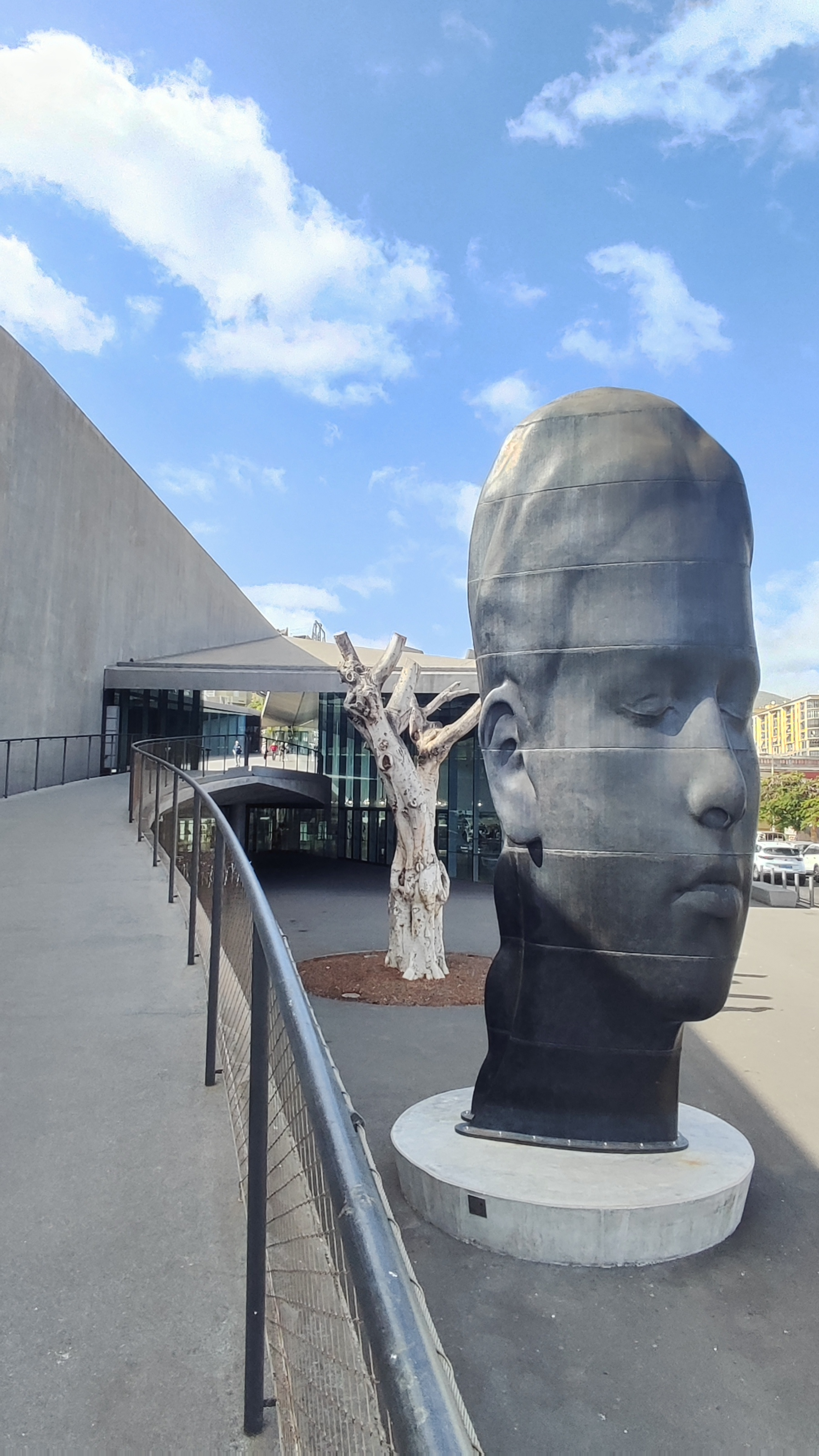
Carla, Jaume Plensa (2018)

The Tenerife Island photography center has been attached to the TEA practically since its foundation. Its main objective is focused on the dissemination and reflection on visual culture, the dissemination of the photographic heritage of the whole archipelago, and the conservation of these places.

During the opening period of the center, more than 350 exhibitions have been carried out, where the biannual event "Fotonoviembre" stands out, which since 1991 has had the participation of renowned national and international authors and many others not so well-known, being one of the pioneers in the state. Within this branch, the collection referring to the Canary Islands stands out, which has negatives on glass and many others on paper dating from the 19th and 20th centuries. Notable among the photography collection are authors such as Manuel Álvarez Bravo, Bernard Plossú, Alberto Schommer, Carlos Schwartz, Javier Vallhonrat, Néstor Torrens, Graciela Iturbide, Juan Carlos Batista, Ferran Freixa, Teresa Arozena, Rafael Navarro, Francis Naranjo, Pierre Molinier, Ferrero Villares, Julio Álvarez Yagüe, Isabel Flores, Miwa Yanagi, Adam Fuss, Tarek Ode, Poldo Cebrián, Luigi Guirri, Juan Hidalgo or Pierre Vallet. This entire collection is currently in the digitization process.

== Sculpture "Carla" ==
Since 2023, the sculpture called "Carla" by the sculptor Jaume Plensa has been on the outside of the building. It is a female head with closed eyes, 7 meters high and weighing 7.8 tons. The sculpture itself was made in 2018, in cast iron. The piece was acquired by the Cabildo de Tenerife, and arrived on the island coinciding with the 50th anniversary of the I International Street Sculpture Exhibition that took place in Santa Cruz de Tenerife between 1973-1974. According to the author, the work was inspired by a 14-year-old girl, although her skull is elongated, compressed, elaborate and her hair has changed. Since its installation outside the building, "Carla" has become a symbol of the Tenerife Espacio de las Artes.
