= The Champion (painting) =

Painting by Charles Lock Eastlake

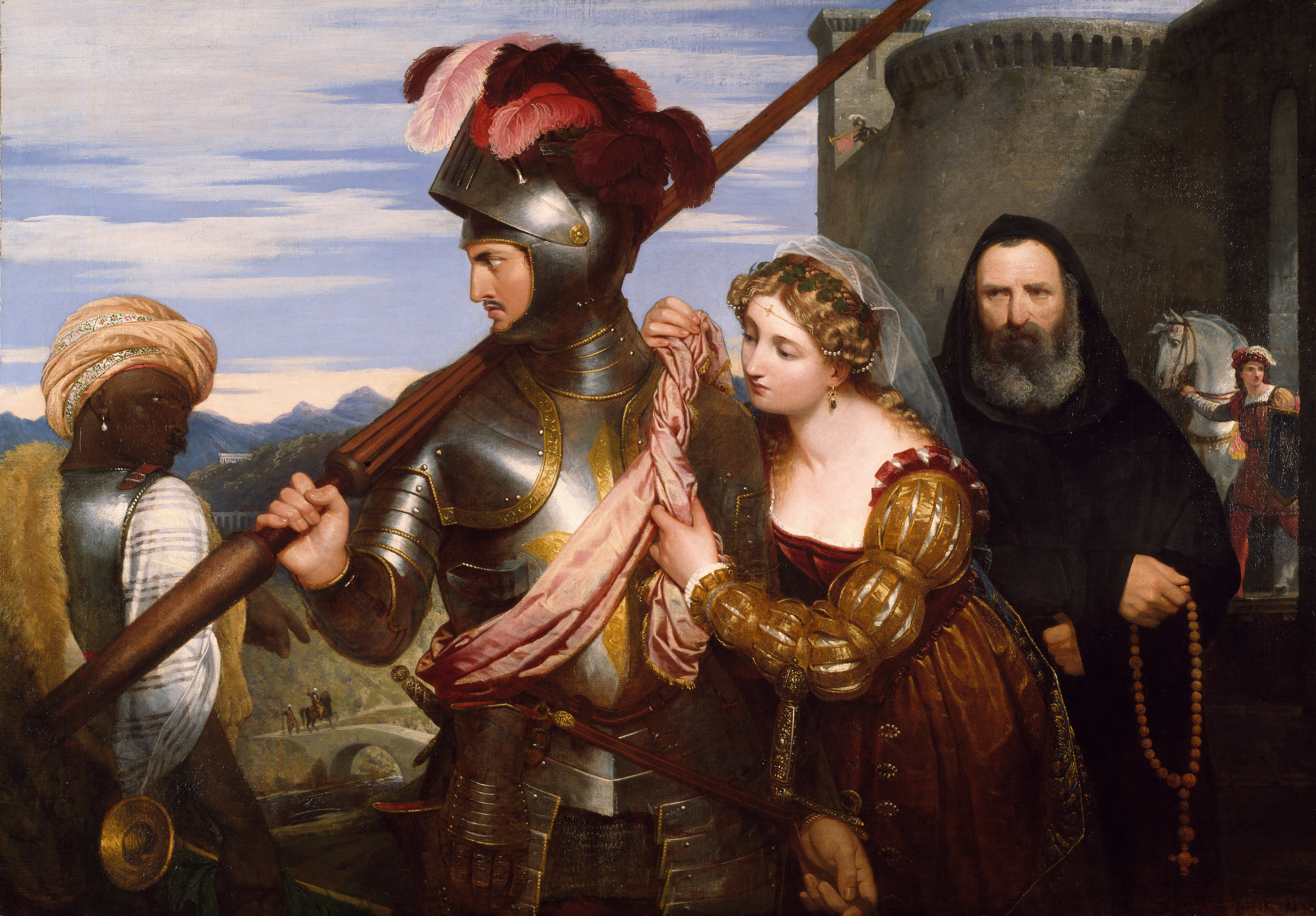
- Artist: Charles Lock Eastlake
- Year: 1824
- Type: Oil on canvas, history painting
- Dimensions: 122.5 cm × 174 cm (48.2 in × 69 in)
- Location: Birmingham Museum and Art Gallery; Birmingham

The Champion is an 1824 history painting by the British artist Charles Lock Eastlake. It depicts a knight about to depart for battle or possibly for jousting as a lady ties a "favour" around his armour. It reflected the growing influence of medievalism in Romanticism at the time and was likely influenced by the novels of Walter Scott. It is noticeable for combining these themes with the bright colours that reflected Eastlake's fascination with the Venetian School of the sixteenth century. It was a theme that would be taken up later by the Pre-Raphaelites.

After the success of his breakthrough work Napoleon on the Bellerophon in 1815, Eastlake settled in Italy for a number of years where he sent paintings back to be displayed in Britain. This picture was exhibited at the British Institution in London in 1825. Today it is part of the collection of the Birmingham Museum and Art Gallery.

== Bibliography ==
- Barringer, T. J. Reading the Pre-Raphaelite. Yale University Press, 1999.
- Ellis, Andrew & Roe, Sonia. Oil Paintings in Public Ownership in Birmingham. Public Catalogue Foundation, 2008.
- Monkhouse, Cosmo. Pictures by Sir Charles Eastlake. Virtue, Spalding, 1876.
- Wright, Christopher, Gordon, Catherine May & Smith, Mary Peskett. British and Irish Paintings in Public Collections: An Index of British and Irish Oil Paintings by Artists Born Before 1870 in Public and Institutional Collections in the United Kingdom and Ireland. Yale University Press, 2006.
