= Brutus Exhorting the Romans to Revenge the Death of Lucretia =

Painting by Charles Lock Eastlake

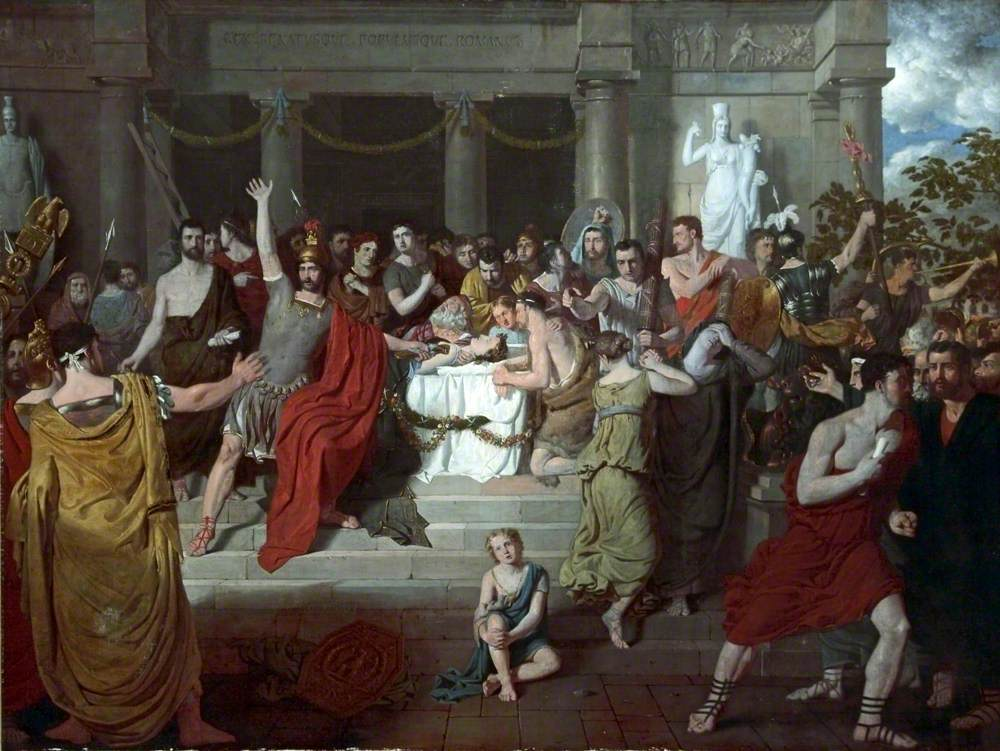
- Artist: Charles Lock Eastlake
- Year: 1814
- Type: Oil on canvas, history painting
- Dimensions: 116.8 cm × 152.4 cm (46.0 in × 60.0 in)
- Location: Williamson Art Gallery and Museum; Birkenhead

Brutus Exhorting the Romans to Revenge the Death of Lucretia is an 1814 history painting by the British artist Charles Lock Eastlake. Depicting a scene from Ancient Rome it features the politician Lucius Junius Brutus demanding his fellow Roman avenge the tragic death of the noblewoman Lucretia, the events that to the fall of the monarch Lucius Tarquinius Superbus and the establishment of the Roman Republic. Painted at the beginning of his career, the picture is distinctly neoclassical in style.

The following year the Plymouth-based artist enjoyed a major success with Napoleon on the Bellerophon which allowed him to travel around Continental Europe studying Old Masters. He settled in Rome for many years but later returned to London where he was elected President of the Royal Academy in 1850.

Today, the painting is in the collection of the Williamson Art Gallery and Museum in Birkenhead in Merseyside. It was gifted to the museum in 1902 by Charles Williamson, a director of the Cunard Steamship Company, in celebration of the Coronation of Edward VII.

== Bibliography ==
- Kemp, David. The Pleasures and Treasures of Britain: A Discerning Traveller's Companion. Dundurn, 1992.
- Morris, Edward. Public Art Collections in North-west England: A History and Guide. Liverpool University Press, 2001.
- Susinno, Stefano. Maestà di Roma: da Napoleone all'unità d'Italia. Universale ed eterna ; Capitale delle arti. Electa, 2003.
