= The Colosseum from the Campo Vaccino =

Painting by Charles Lock Eastlake

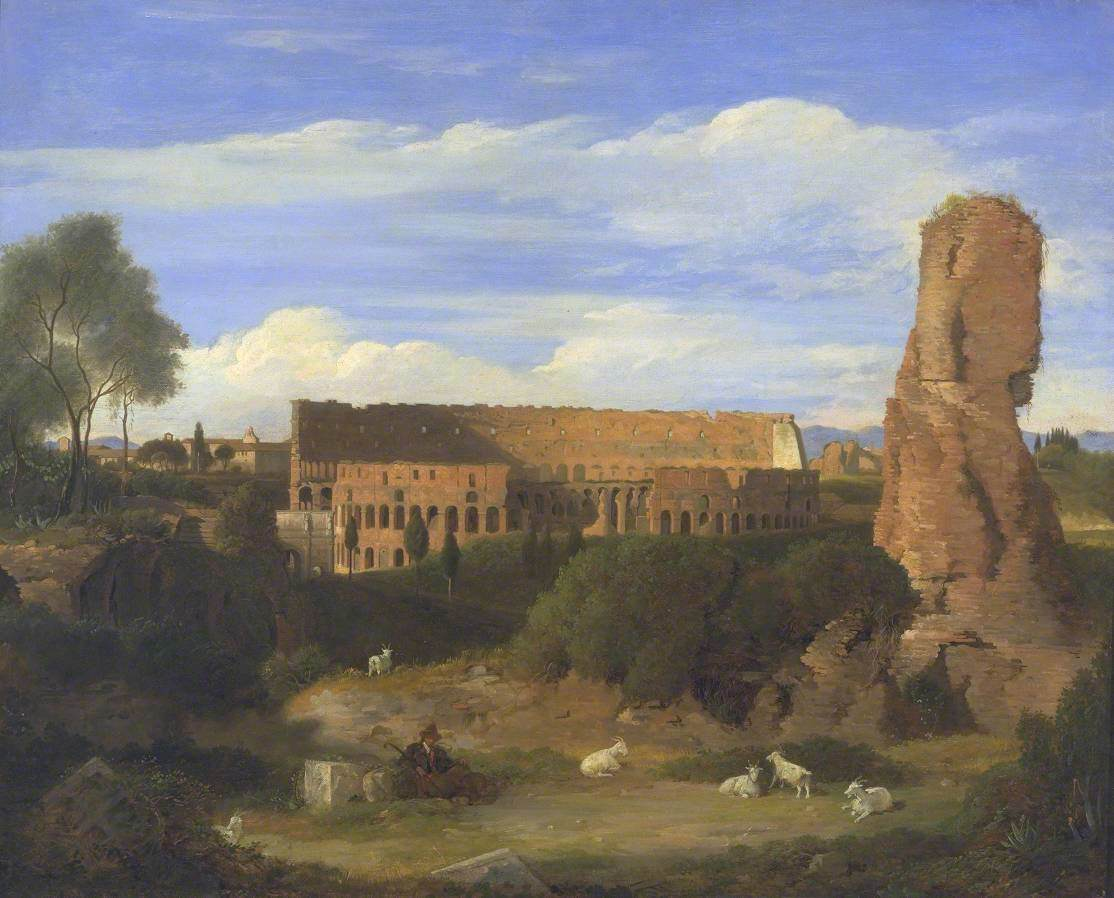
- Artist: Charles Lock Eastlake
- Year: 1822
- Type: Oil on canvas, landscape painting
- Dimensions: 64.8 cm × 52.7 cm (25.5 in × 20.7 in)
- Location: Tate Britain, London

The Colosseum from the Campo Vaccino is an oil on canvas landscape painting by the English artist Charles Lock Eastlake, from 1822.

== History and description ==
It depicts a view of the Colosseum in Rome viewed from the Palatine Hill which along with the Roman Forum was known at the time as the Campo Vaccino, due to its use as an enclosure for cattle brought for the city's markets. The rural surroundings of the Ancient Roman landscape are emphasised in Eastlake's painting. The same year Eastlake also produced another work entitled The Colosseum from the Esquiline.

Since the success of his 1815 painting Napoleon on the Bellerophon, Eastlake had been living in Italy producing a mixture of landscapes and genre paintings of local life. He was known for working outdoors in the heat of high summer. Eastlake sent the painting back to appear at the Royal Academy of Art's Summer Exhibition of 1823 at Somerset House. Today is in the collection of the Tate Britain in Pimlico, having been acquired in 1964.

== Bibliography ==
- Gaunt, William. Colosseum from the Campo Vaccino. Phaidon, 1972.
- Liversidge, M.J.H. (ed.) Imagining Rome: British Artists and Rome in the Nineteenth Century. Merrell Holberton, 1996.
- Noon, Patrick & Bann, Stephen. Constable to Delacroix: British Art and the French Romantics. Tate, 2003.
