= The Erechtheum, Athens =

Painting by Charles Lock Eastlake

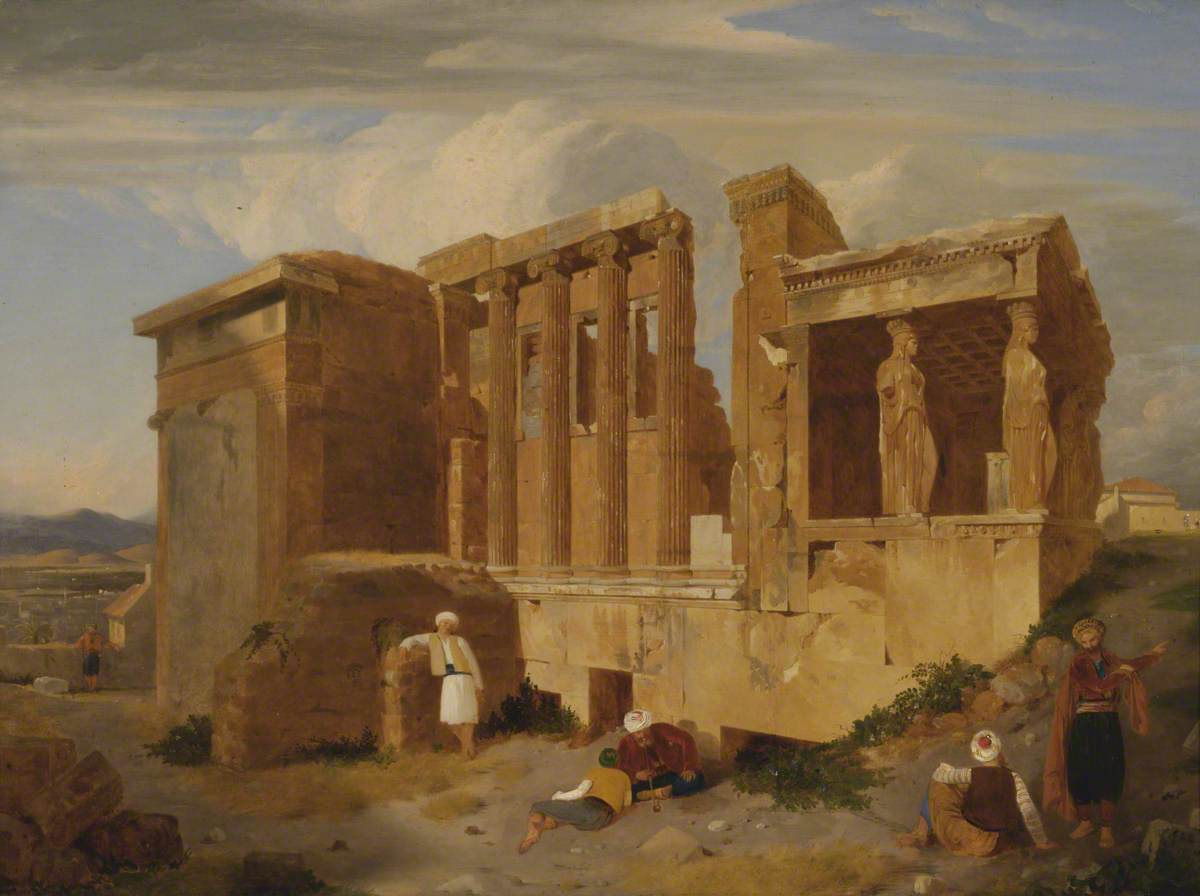
- Artist: Charles Lock Eastlake
- Year: 1821
- Type: Oil on canvas, landscape painting
- Dimensions: 67 cm × 89.5 cm (26 in × 35.2 in)
- Location: Yale Center for British Art, New Haven

The Erechtheum, Athens is an oil on canvas landscape painting by the British artist Charles Lock Eastlake, from 1821. It features a view of the Ancient Greek Erechtheion at the Acropolis in Athens.

== History and description ==
The Devon-born Eastlake enjoyed great success with his early work Napoleon on the Bellerophon, depicting Napoleon on board a British warship after the Waterloo campaign. This allowed him to travel across Continental Europe, particularly in Greece and then Italy where he settled for a number of years. This work was inspired by his visit to Athens but painted when he had settled in Rome. Eastlake subsequently returned to Britain and in 1850 was elected President of the Royal Academy. The work was commissioned by the philhellenist Frederick North, 5th Earl of Guilford. Today the painting is in the collection of the Yale Center for British Art in New Haven, Connecticut.

== Bibliography ==
- Kemp, David. The Pleasures and Treasures of Britain: A Discerning Traveller's Companion. Dundurn, 1992.
- Tsigakou, Fani-Maria. The Discovery of Greece: Travellers and Painters of the Romantic Era. Thames and Hudson, 1981.
