= Cataño (disambiguation) =

Cataño may refer to:

== Places ==
- Cataño, Puerto Rico, a municipality
  - Cataño barrio-pueblo, a barrio
- Cataño, Humacao, Puerto Rico, a barrio

== People ==
- Adriana Cataño, American actress and television personality
- Claudio Cataño (born 1985), Colombian actor
- Diego Cataño (born 1990), Mexican actor best known for his role in Narcos
- Eduardo Cataño (1910–1964), Mexican painter
- Esneda Ruiz Cataño (born 1968), Colombian serial killer
- José Carlos Cataño (born 1954), Spanish poet
