= The Celian Hill from the Palatine =

Painting by Charles Lock Eastlake

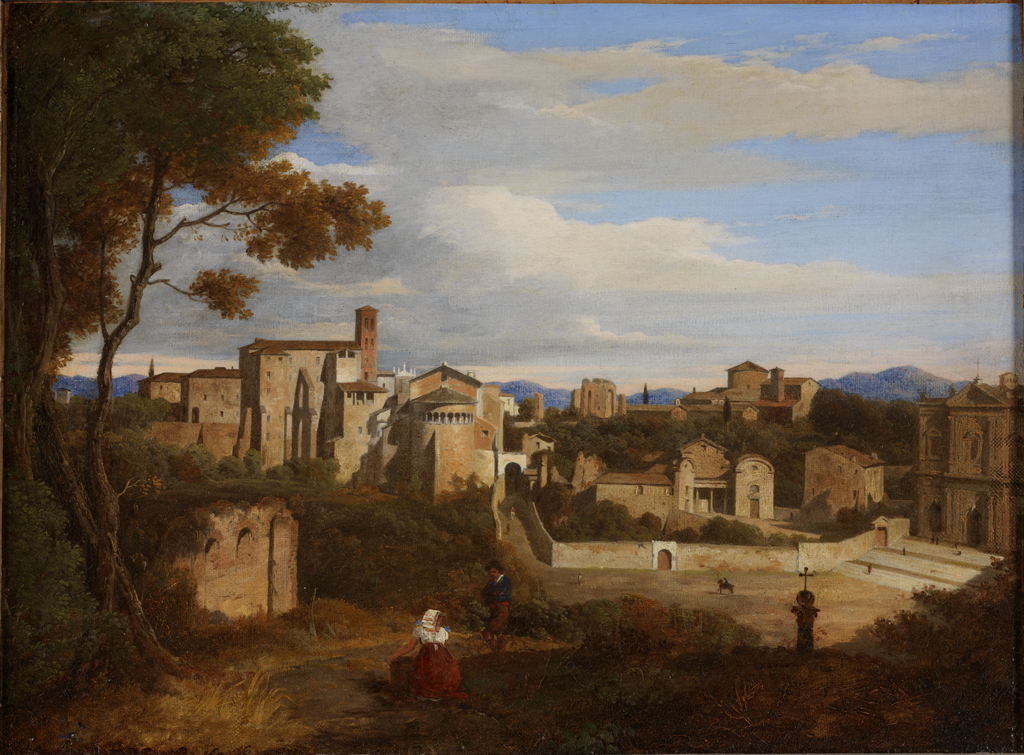
- Artist: Charles Lock Eastlake
- Year: 1823
- Type: Oil on canvas, landscape
- Dimensions: 33.5 cm × 44.8 cm (13.2 in × 17.6 in)
- Location: Rhode Island School of Design Museum, Providence

The Celian Hill from the Palatine is an oil on canvas landscape painting by the British artist Charles Lock Eastlake, from 1823. It depicts a scene of the Celian Hill in Rome as viewed from the Palatine Hill, notable for the ancient walls and Renaissance churches.

== History and description ==
Following the success of his breakthrough work Napoleon on the Bellerophon in 1815, Eastlake was able to travel in Continental Europe. He eventually settled in Italy where he lived between 1816 and 1830, specialising in producing landscapes and history paintings from his studios in Rome. A friend of Turner, he continued to send paintings back to be shown at the Royal Academy's Summer Exhibitions in London. He returned to England and in 1850 was elected as President of the Royal Academy.

Today it is in the collection of the Rhode Island School of Design Museum.

== Bibliography ==
- Kemp, David. The Pleasures and Treasures of Britain: A Discerning Traveller's Companion. Dundurn, 1992.
- Mitchell, Sally. Victorian Britain: An Encyclopedia. Routledge, 2012.
- Slimmon, Anne H. '& Singsen, Judith A. European Painting and Sculpture, Ca. 1770-1937, in the Museum of Art, Rhode Island School of Design. University of Pennsylvania Press, 1991.
