= Pilgrims Arriving in Sight of Rome =

Painting by Charles Lock Eastlake

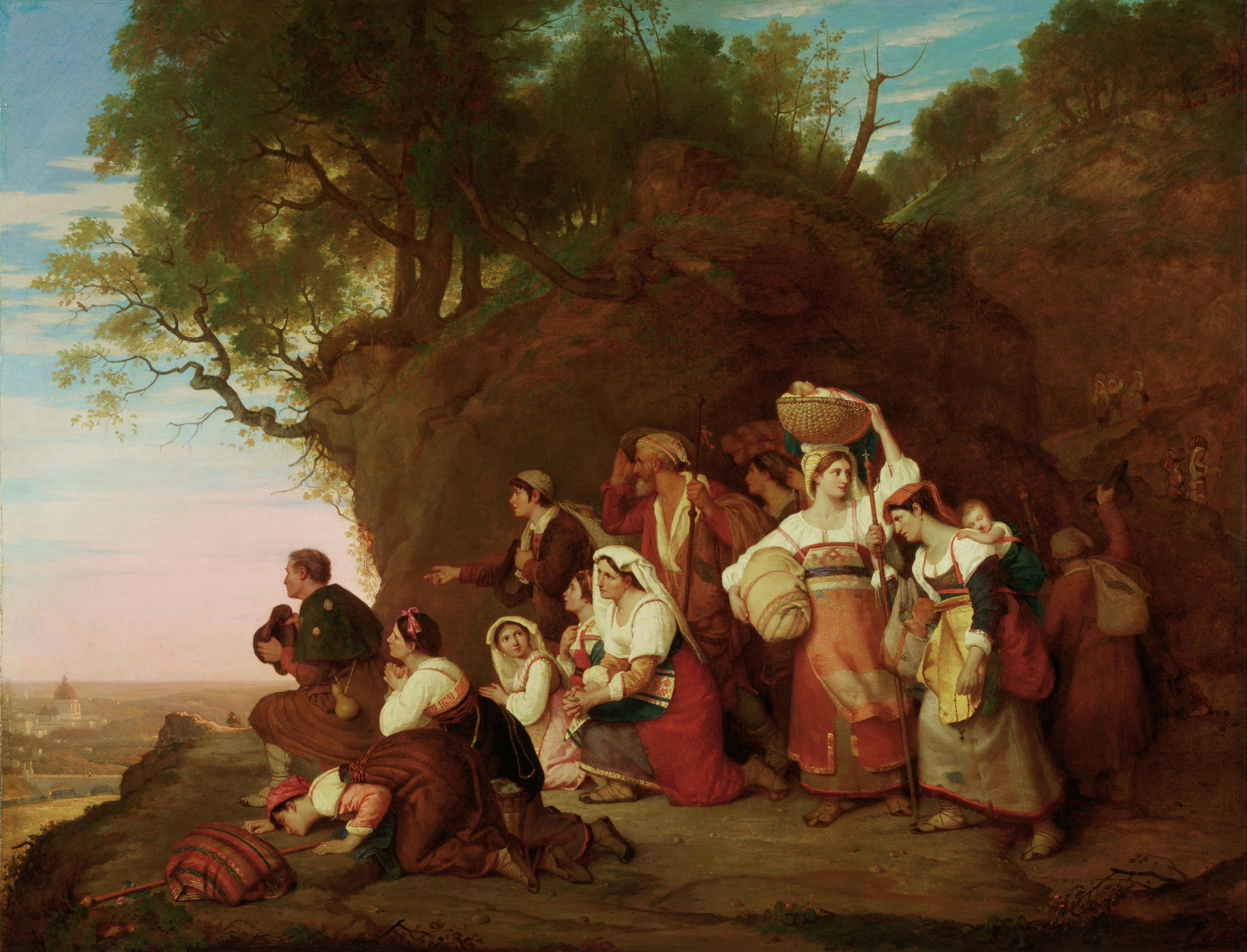
- Artist: Charles Lock Eastlake
- Year: 1827
- Type: Oil on canvas, genre painting
- Dimensions: 94.9 cm × 118.7 cm (37.4 in × 46.7 in)
- Location: Philadelphia Museum of Art; Pennsylvania

Pilgrims Arriving in Sight of Rome is an 1827 genre painting by the British artist Charles Lock Eastlake. It depicts a group of Catholic pilgrims heading to Rome during the holy year who fall to their knees in prayer at the first sight of the city.

Following the phenomenal success of his early work Napoleon on the Bellerophon in 1815, Eastlake toured Continental Europe and settled in Rome where he sent his paintings back to England to be displayed. Later returning to Britain he became the first director of the National Gallery and in 1850 was elected President of the Royal Academy in succession to Martin Archer Shee.

The work was painted by commission for the aristocratic art collector the Duke of Bedford. The picture was displayed at the Royal Academy Exhibition of 1828 at Somerset House in London. Today it is in the Philadelphia Museum of Art in Pennsylvania, having been acquired in 1994.

== Bibliography ==
- Black, Jeremy. English Culture: From the 18th Century to the Present Day. Amberley Publishing, 2024.
- Liversidge, Michael & Edwards, Catherine. Imagining Rome British Artists and Rome in the Nineteenth Century. Merrell Holberton, 1996.
- Norman, Geraldine. Nineteenth-century Painters and Painting: A Dictionary. University of California Press, 1977.
