= An Italian Contadina and Her Children =

Painting by Charles Lock Eastlake

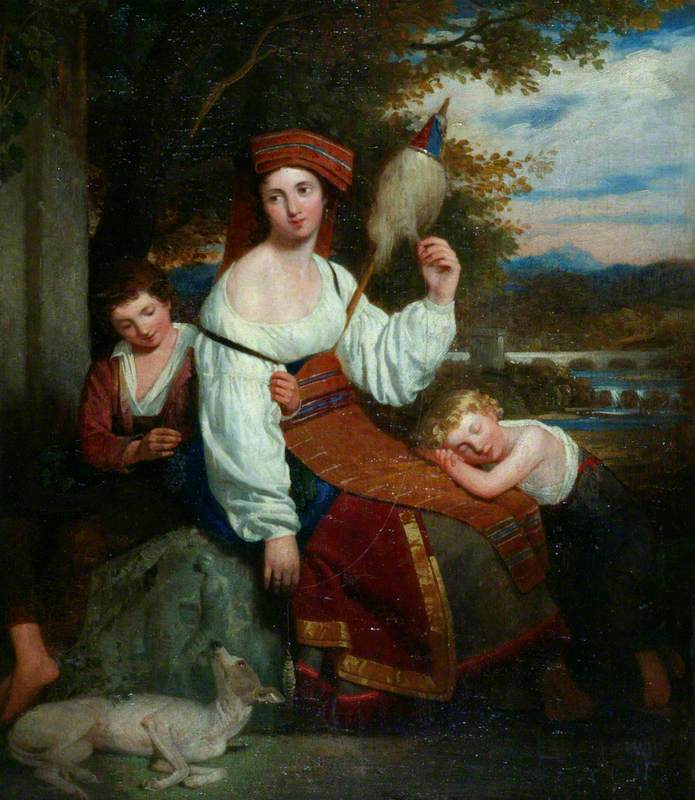
- Artist: Charles Lock Eastlake
- Year: 1823
- Type: Oil on canvas, genre painting
- Dimensions: 46.3 cm × 36.8 cm (18.2 in × 14.5 in)
- Location: Victoria and Albert Museum; London

An Italian Contadina and Her Children is an 1823 oil painting by the British artist Charles Lock Eastlake. It depicts a young Italian peasant woman with her family. Eastlake lived in Rome for many years and sent pictures of Italy back to be displayed in London. He was later elected President of the Royal Academy. The painting was exhibited at the British Institution in Pall Mall in 1824. It was acquired by the art collector John Sheepshanks who presented it to the Victoria and Albert Museum in 1857 as part of the Sheepshanks Gift. An engraving based on it was published by The Amulet.

== Bibliography ==
- Parkinson, Ronald. Catalogue of British Oil Paintings 1820-1860. Victoria and Albert Museum, 1990.
- Roe, Sonia. Oil Paintings in Public Ownership in the Victoria and Albert Museum. Public Catalogue Foundation, 2008.
- Wright, Christopher, Gordon, Catherine May & Smith, Mary Peskett. British and Irish Paintings in Public Collections: An Index of British and Irish Oil Paintings by Artists Born Before 1870 in Public and Institutional Collections in the United Kingdom and Ireland. Yale University Press, 2006.
