= Williamson Art Gallery and Museum =

Art gallery and museum in Wirral, England

Coordinates: 53.38491°N 3.04028°W

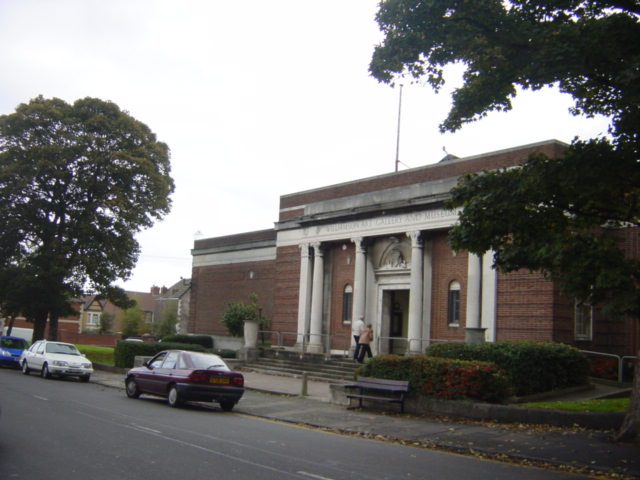
Williamson Art Gallery & Museum, Birkenhead.

The Williamson Art Gallery and Museum is an art gallery and museum situated in Birkenhead, Merseyside, England and houses Wirral's art collection.

== History ==
The art gallery and museum opened on 1 December 1928, the single-storey building is Neo-Georgian in style, and was deliberately designed to blend in with the local surroundings. Financial support for its establishment was primarily provided by John Williamson, a Director of the Cunard Steamship Co. Ltd. and his son Patrick Williamson. Local support for the establishment of the museum also came from members and families of the nearby Birkenhead Art Club (founded 1908) who helped contributed artworks and funding to the building.

== Collections and events ==
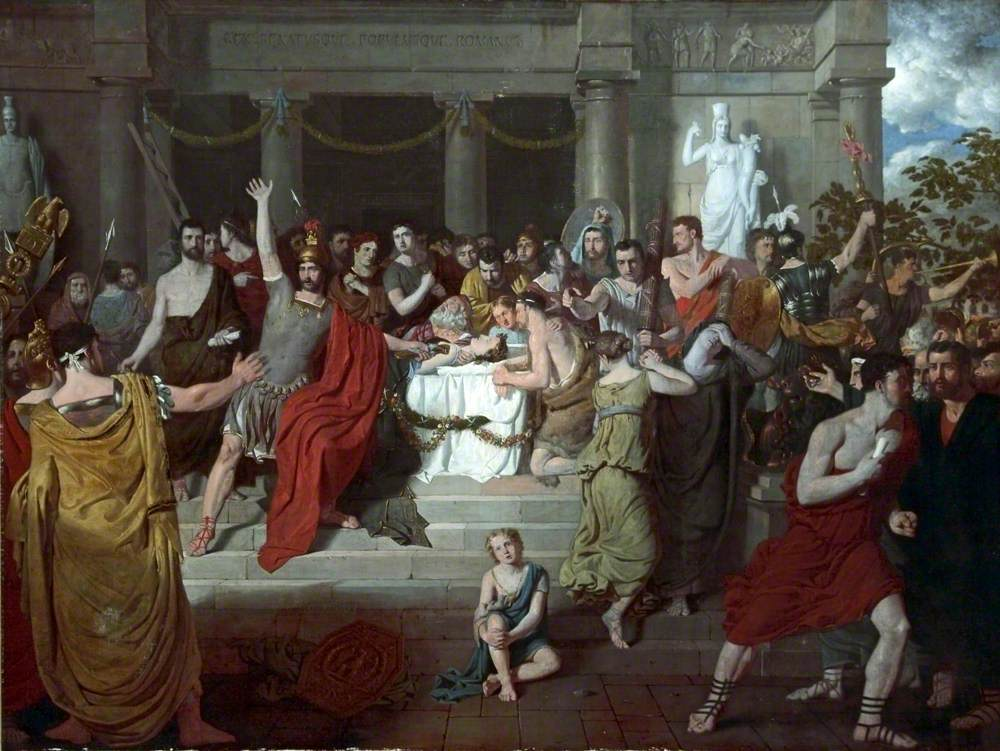
Brutus Exhorting the Romans to Revenge the Death of Lucretia by Charles Lock Eastlake, 1814

Its collection includes Victorian oil paintings, English watercolours, Liverpool porcelain, and the UK's largest public collection of Della Robbia pottery. It also has a large collection of ship models, focusing on Cammell Laird shipbuilders, the Mersey Ferries, and the vessels that used the River Mersey. This includes items from ships such as the bell of the RMS Mauretania.

The gallery also hosts regular exhibitions that can include work by nationally and internationally renowned artists. There are regular musical concerts and the gallery is also a venue for art and crafts workshops.

Paintings in the gallery include:

- The muslin dress by Philip Wilson Steer.
- Seagulls by Albert Joseph Moore.

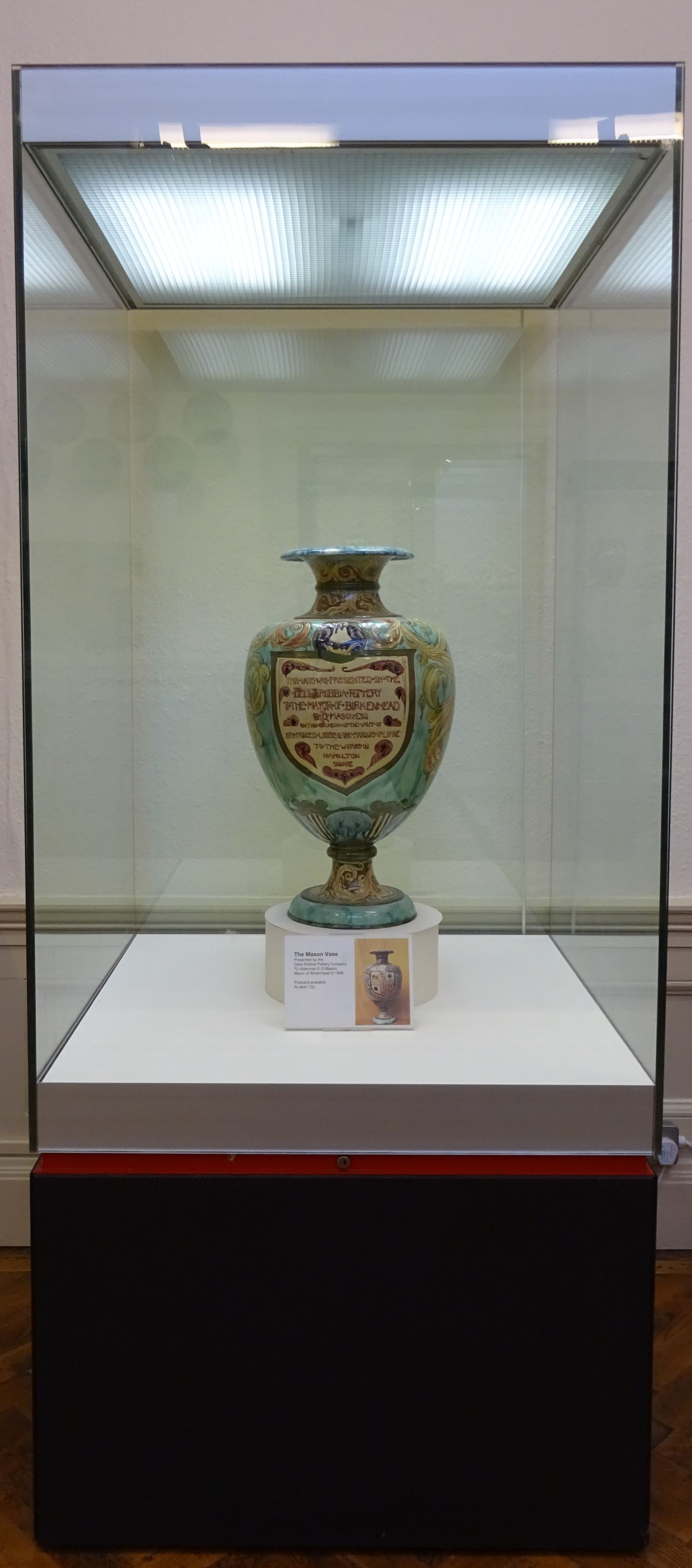
The Mason Vase

== See also ==
- Listed buildings in Claughton, Merseyside
- Birkenhead Priory
