= Centro de Fotografía Isla de Tenerife =

Coordinates: 28.46389°N 16.25075°W

The Centro de Fotografía Isla de Tenerife (Photo Center Tenerife Island) is a museum dedicated to photography located in the city of Santa Cruz de Tenerife (Spain) which was opened in 1989. The museum moved under the control of TEA (Tenerife Espacio de las Artes) in 2008.

== History ==
The museum was opened on 30 November 1989 by the Cabildo de Tenerife, with a goal to “promote aspects of artistic creation with enormous potential for contemporary expression, and to rescue and preserve our own heritage of images, which still remains dispersed and lacks sufficient preservation".

== Collections ==
They hold two separate photograph collections, one of documentary photography, and one of artistic photography, in over 20,000 m² of exhibition space. The centre also holds a large collection of works by Óscar Domínguez. In addition to this, they hold an archive of postcards depicting the Canary islands, and a large collection of magic lantern slides. Much of their archive is visible online.

The museum is also home to a studio and photo lab, conference room, a specialized library with more than 3,500 volumes, files, and store collections, a gift shop and a restaurant. There is a space for childrens and family activities called "MiniTEA". The current exhibition space was built by Swiss architects Herzog and De Meuron.

The centre has hosted the event "Fotonoviembre", also known as the "Festival Internacional de Fotografía de Tenerife" since 1991.
