= Charles Lock Eastlake =

British painter (1793–1865)

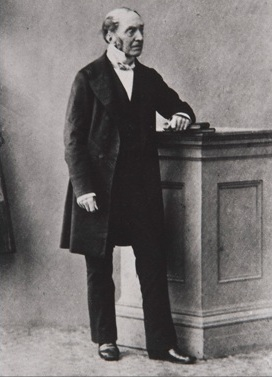
- Portrait of Sir Charles Eastlake (1865), by an unknown photographer, National Gallery, London
- Born: 17 November 1793; Plymouth, Devon, England
- Died: 24 December 1865 (aged 72); Pisa, Italy

Sir Charles Lock Eastlake PRA (17 November 1793 – 24 December 1865) was a British painter, gallery director, collector and writer of the 19th century. After a period as keeper, he was the first director of the National Gallery. From 1850 to 1865 he served as President of the Royal Academy, succeeding Martin Archer Shee in the role.

== Life ==
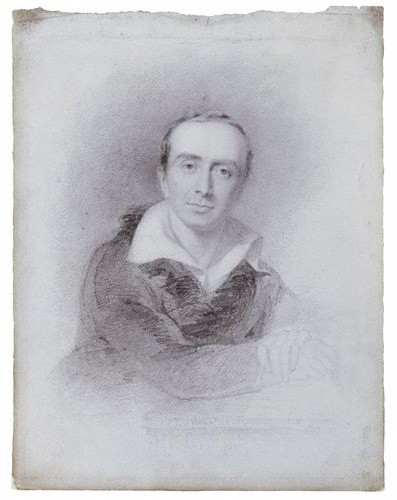
Charles Eastlake in a pencil sketch by John Partridge, 1825

Eastlake was born in Plymouth, Devon, the fourth son of an Admiralty lawyer. He was educated at local grammar schools in Plymouth, including Plymouth Grammar School, and, briefly, at Charterhouse (then still in London). He was committed to becoming a painter, and in 1809 he became the first pupil of Benjamin Haydon and a student at the Royal Academy schools in London—where he later exhibited.

However, his first exhibited work was shown at the British Institution in 1815, a year in which he also visited Paris and studied works in the Louvre (then known as the Musée Napoléon). His first notable success was a painting of Napoleon on the Bellerophon (1815; National Maritime Museum, London). Like many other people at the time, Eastlake had hired a boat to take him to the ship on which Napoleon was held in Plymouth harbour. He sketched him from the boat.

In 1816, he travelled to Rome where he painted members of the British elite staying in Italy including fellow artists Sir Thomas Lawrence and J. M. W. Turner. He also travelled to Naples and Athens.

Despite being based predominantly in mainland Europe, Eastlake regularly sent works back to London to be exhibited, and in 1827 he was elected a member of the Royal Academy. Three years later, he returned to England permanently where he continued to paint historical and biblical paintings set in Mediterranean landscapes. While he had been abroad his 1827 painting Lord Byron's Dream was exhibited at the 1829 Royal Academy summer exhibition.

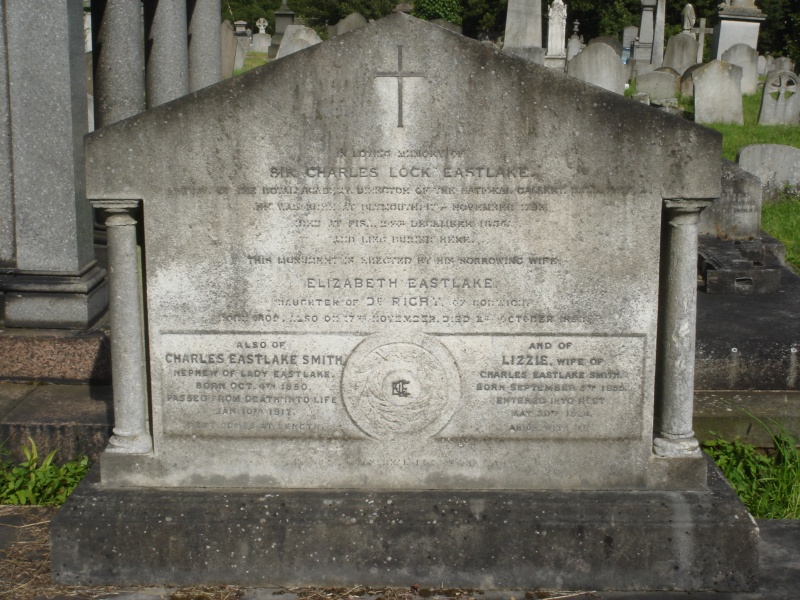
Funerary monument, Kensal Green Cemetery, London

As an art historian, he translated Goethe's Zur Farbenlehre (Theory of Colours, 1840). He edited with extensive and valuable notes the 'Handbuch der Geschichte der Malerei (Handbook of the History of Painting) by Franz Kugler, which in its first English version was translated by 'A Lady', Mrs. Margaret Hutton. These publications and Eastlake's reputation as an artist led to his nomination in 1841 to become secretary of the Fine Arts Commission, the body in charge of government art patronage. He set up home in Fitzroy Square.

In his On Vision and Colours, § 14, Schopenhauer praised Eastlake's translation of Goethe.

Eastlake, the painter and gallery inspector, furnished his countrymen, in 1840, with such an excellent translation of Goethe's theory of color that it is a perfect reproduction of the original and reads more easily; in fact, it is understood more easily than the original.

Having already advised the National Gallery, London on acquisitions, he was appointed the Gallery's second Keeper in 1843, a post he later resigned "in consequence of an unfortunate purchase that roused much animadversion, a portrait erroneously ascribed to Holbein". In 1855 he returned as the first director, "with more extended powers".

In 1849, he married Elizabeth Rigby, an art historian and translator of German art histories. Together they formed a formidable art history writing partnership.

In 1845, he was elected into the National Academy of Design as an Honorary Academician. From 1850 to 1865, he was the second president of the Birmingham Society of Artists. Elected president of the Royal Academy and knighted in 1850, he became a notable figure in the British art establishment. He was appointed the first president of the Photographic Society in 1853 and the first director of the National Gallery in 1855. In 1864, the University of Cambridge awarded him an honorary degree.

== Legacy ==
On 24 December 1865, Eastlake died in Pisa, Italy. He is buried at Kensal Green Cemetery, London. His will provided for the Gallery to purchase his collection of paintings. Lady Eastlake sold her husband's art history book collection to the Gallery's library.

== Popular culture ==
In the film Effie Gray (2014), he is portrayed by James Fox.

== Gallery ==
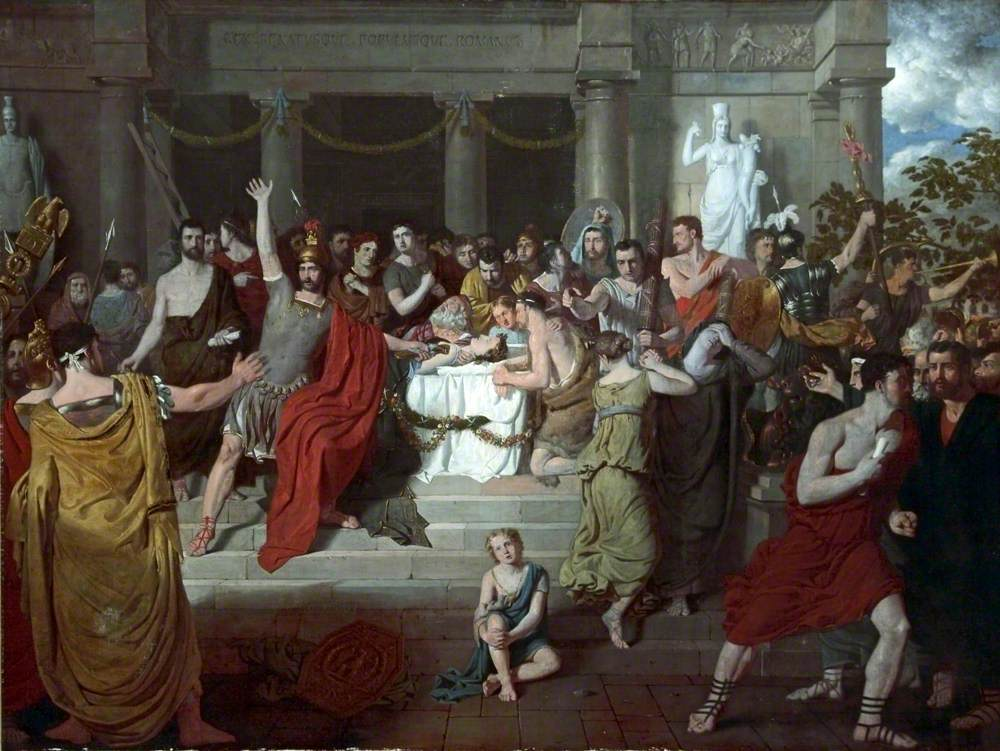
Brutus Exhorting the Romans to Revenge the Death of Lucretia, 1814

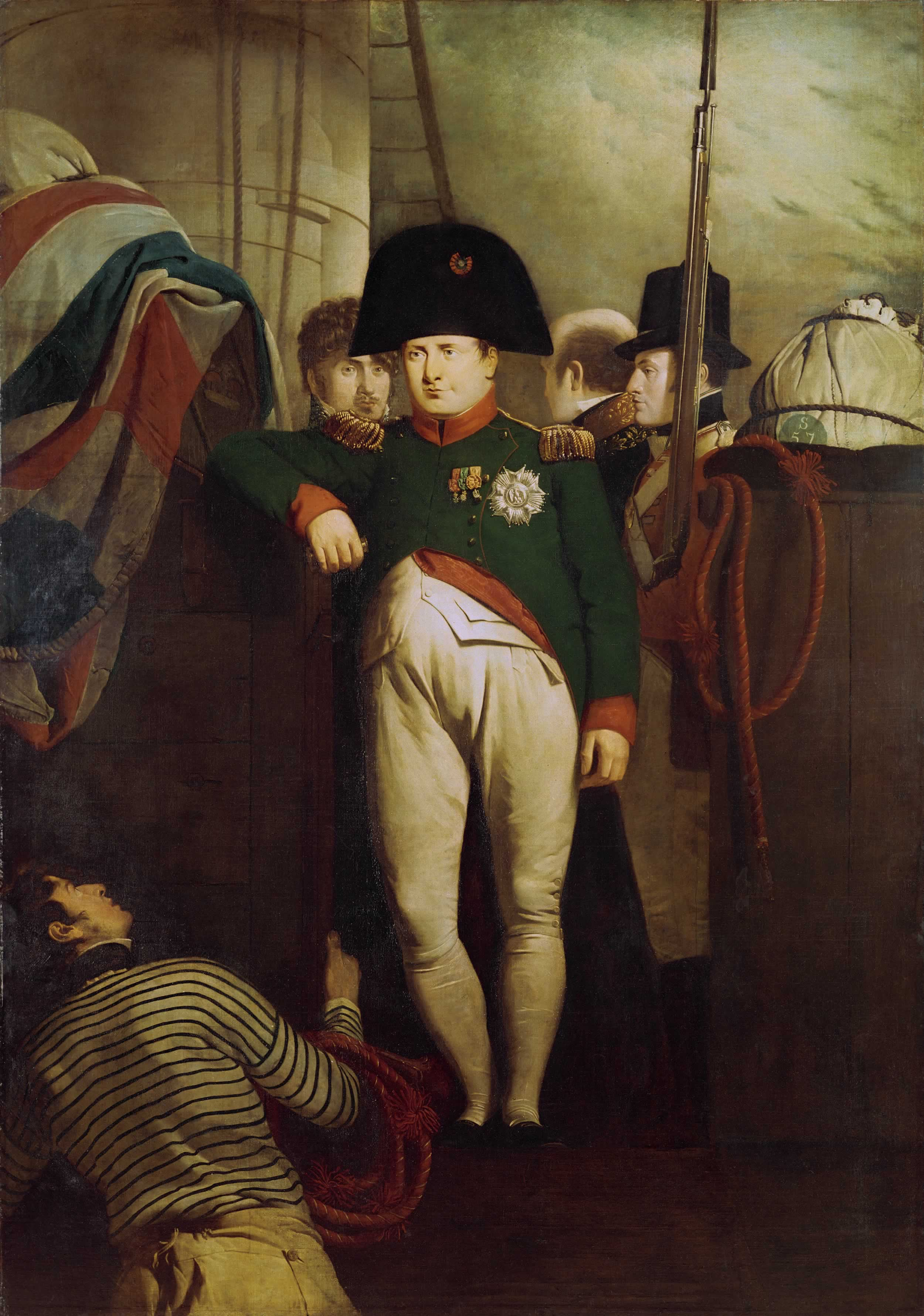
Napoleon on the Bellerophon, 1815

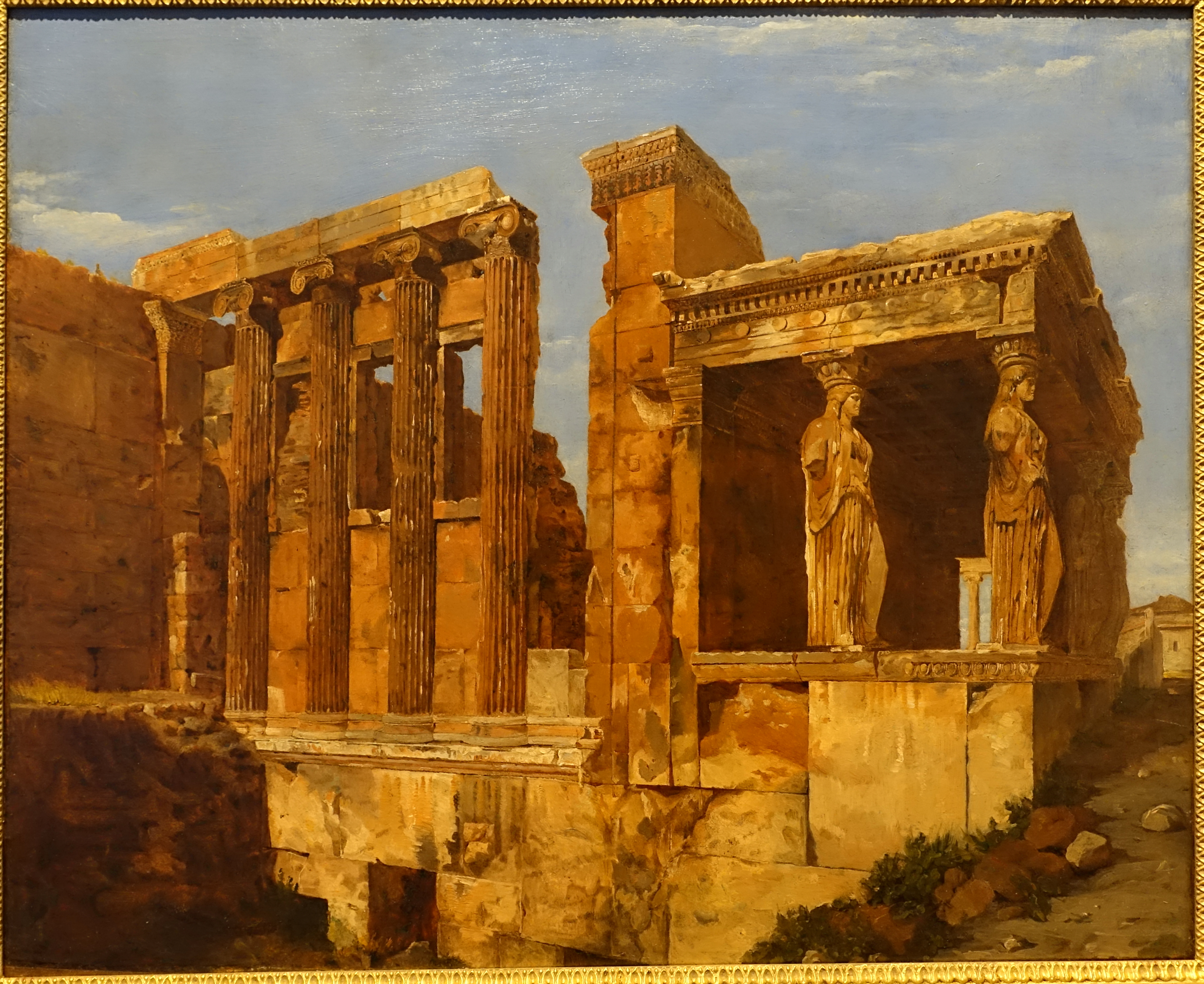
A View of the Erechtheum on the Acropolis, Athens, 1818

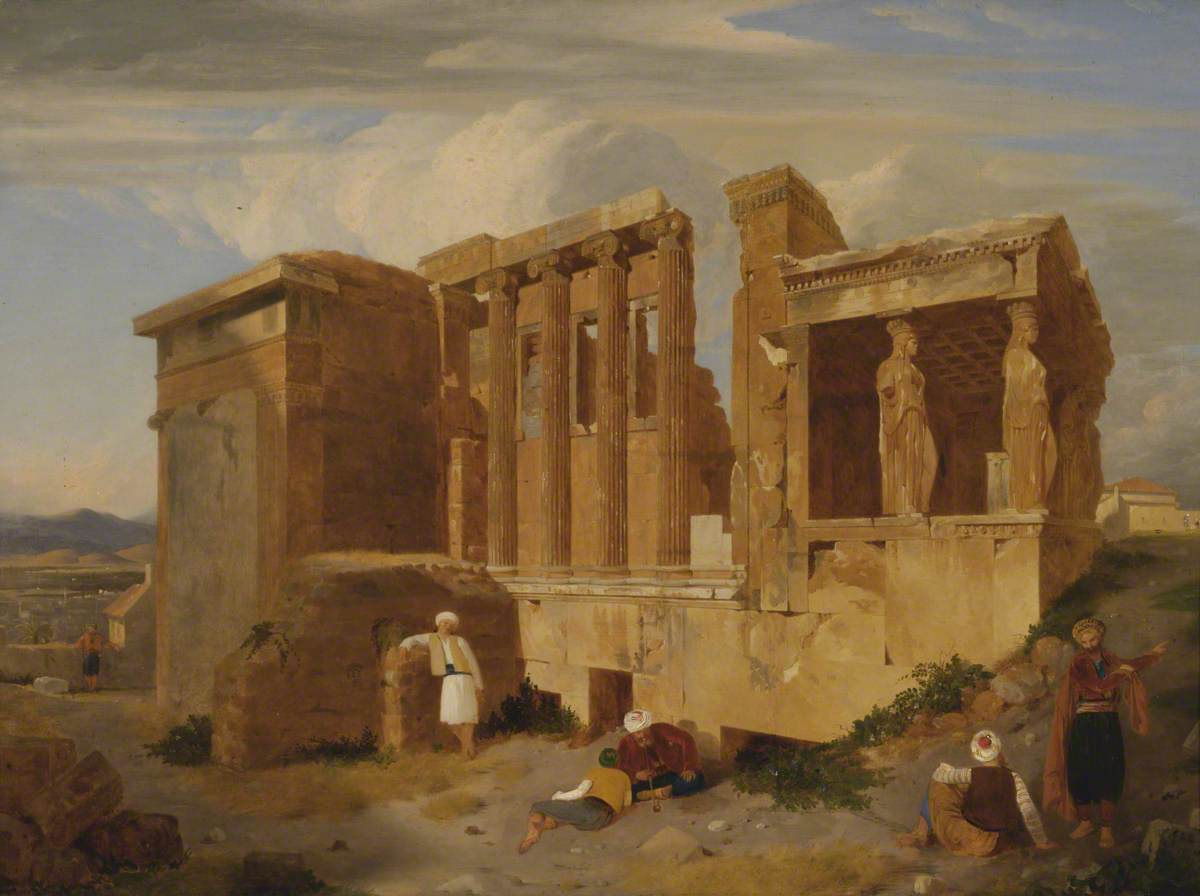
The Erechtheum, Athens, 1821

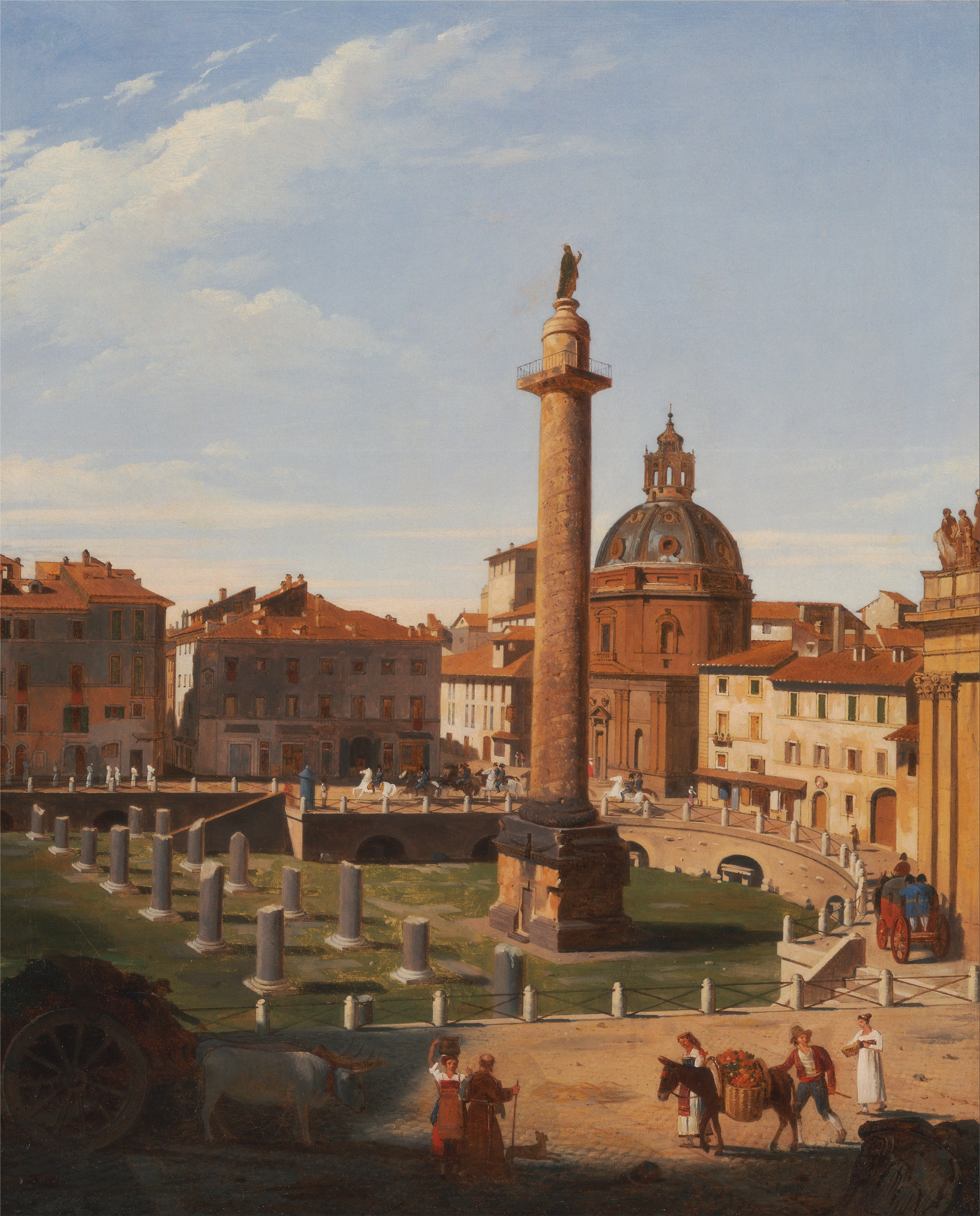
A View of Trajan's Forum, Rome, 1821

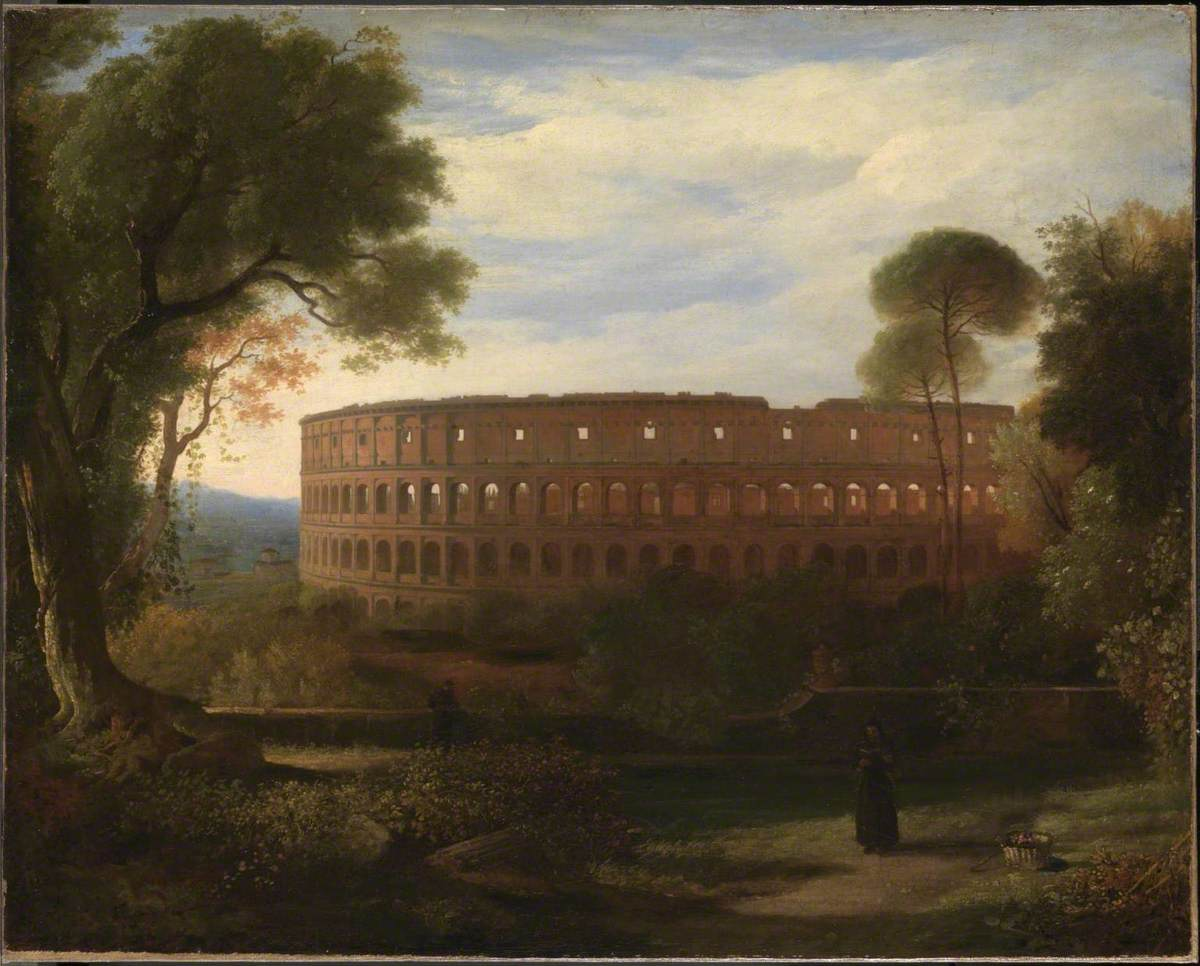
The Colosseum from the Esquiline, 1822

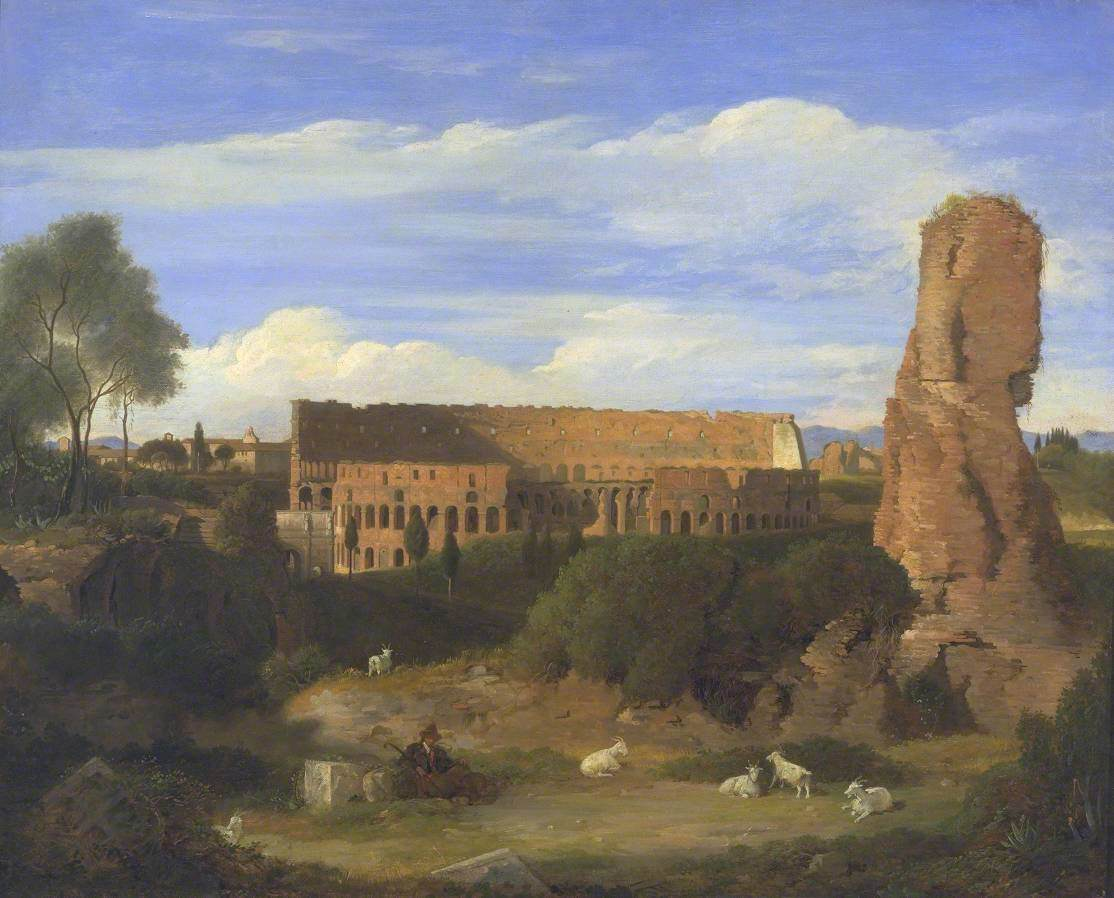
The Colosseum from the Campo Vaccino, 1822

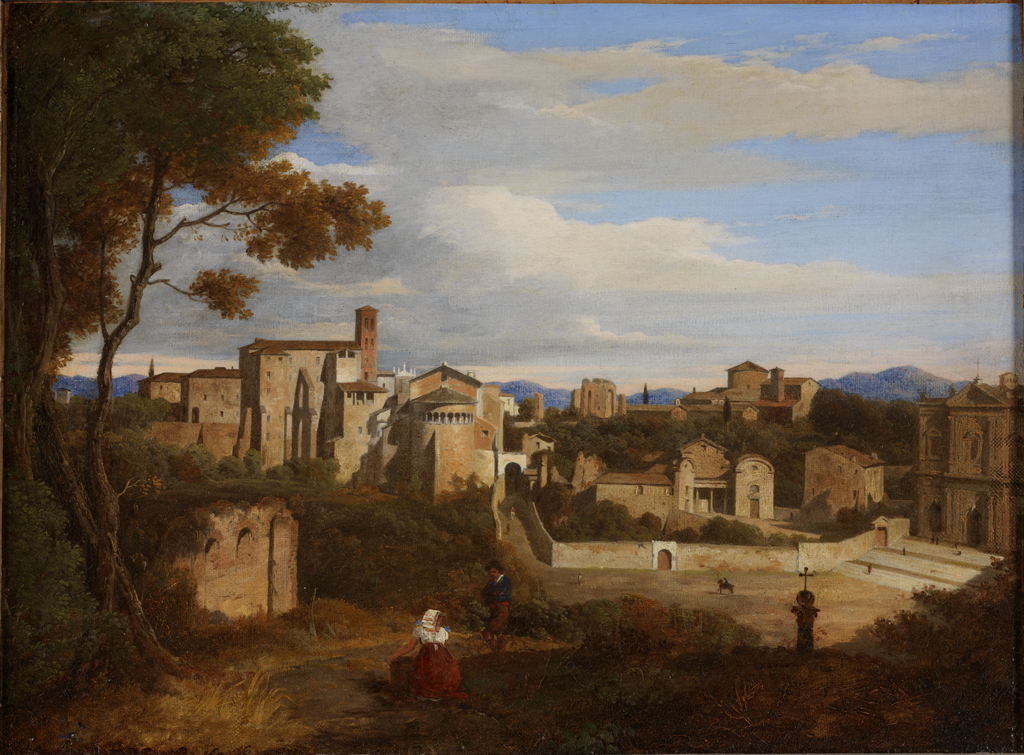
The Celian Hill from the Palatine, 1823

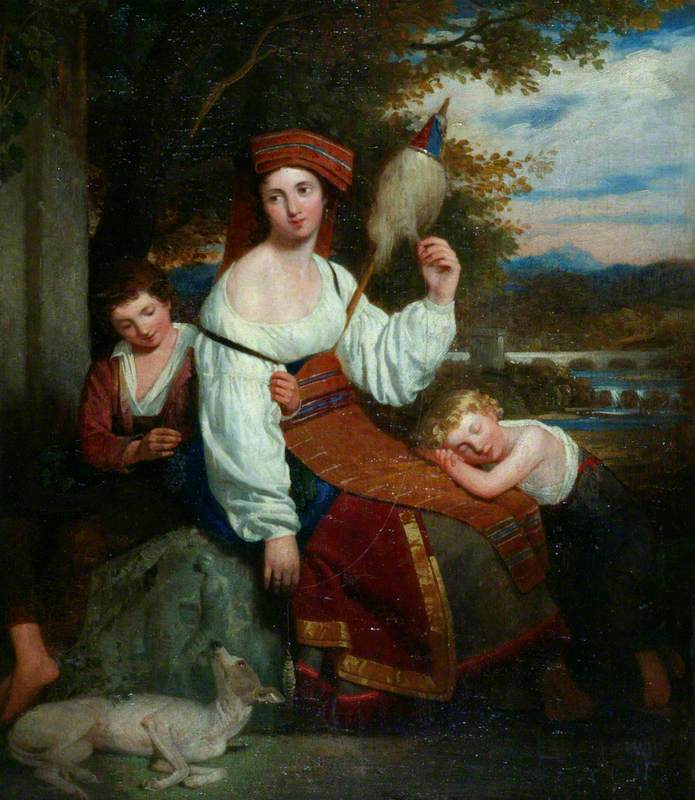
An Italian Contadina and Her Children, 1823

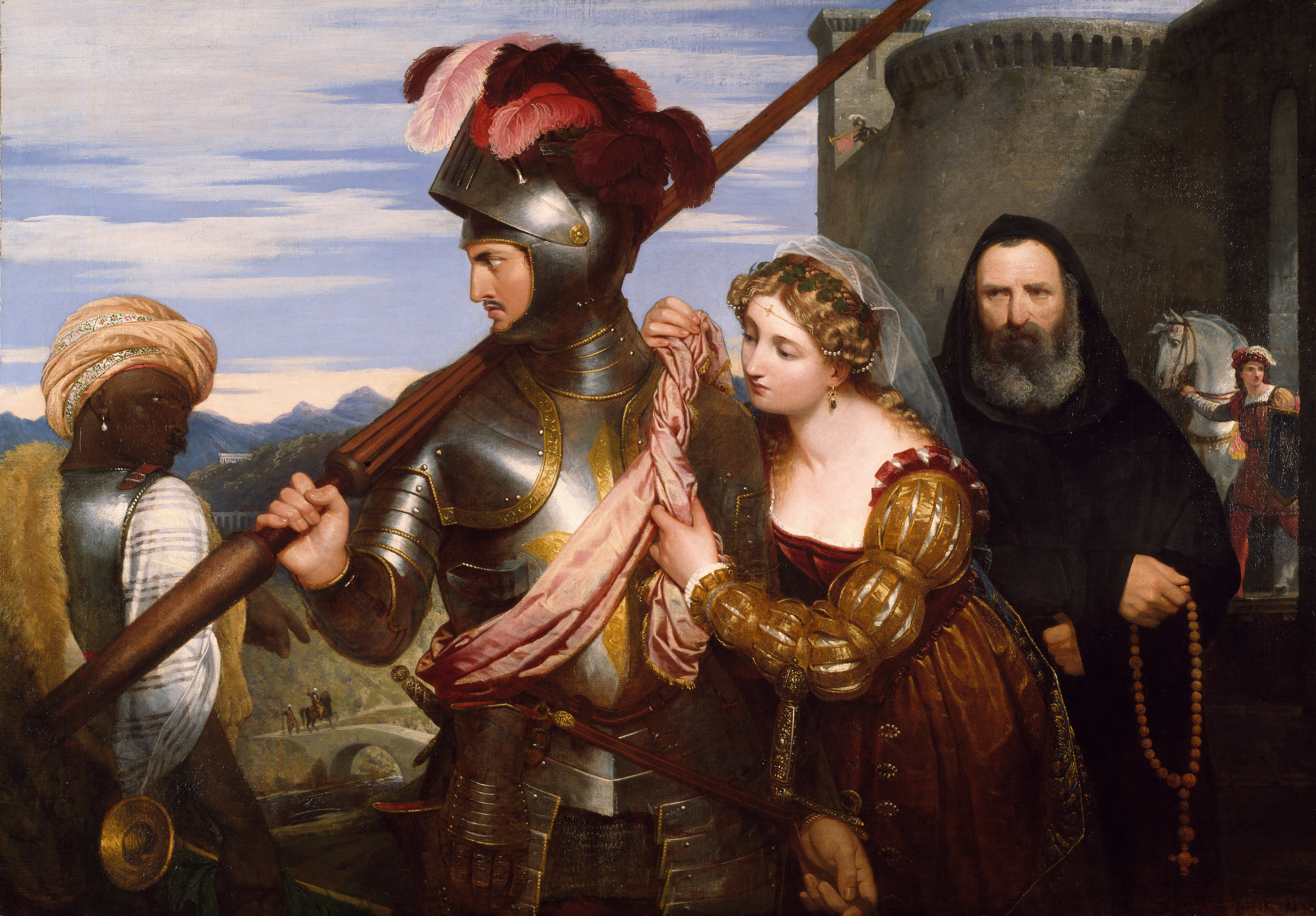
The Champion, 1824

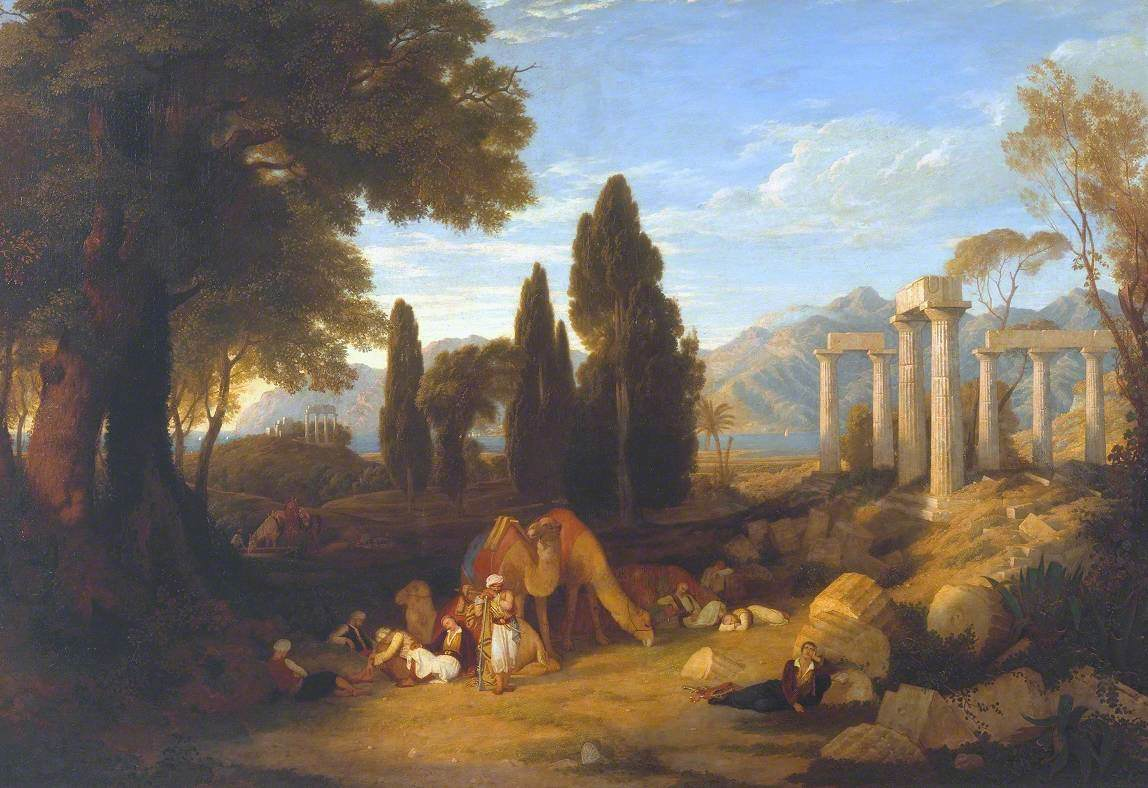
Lord Byron's Dream, 1827

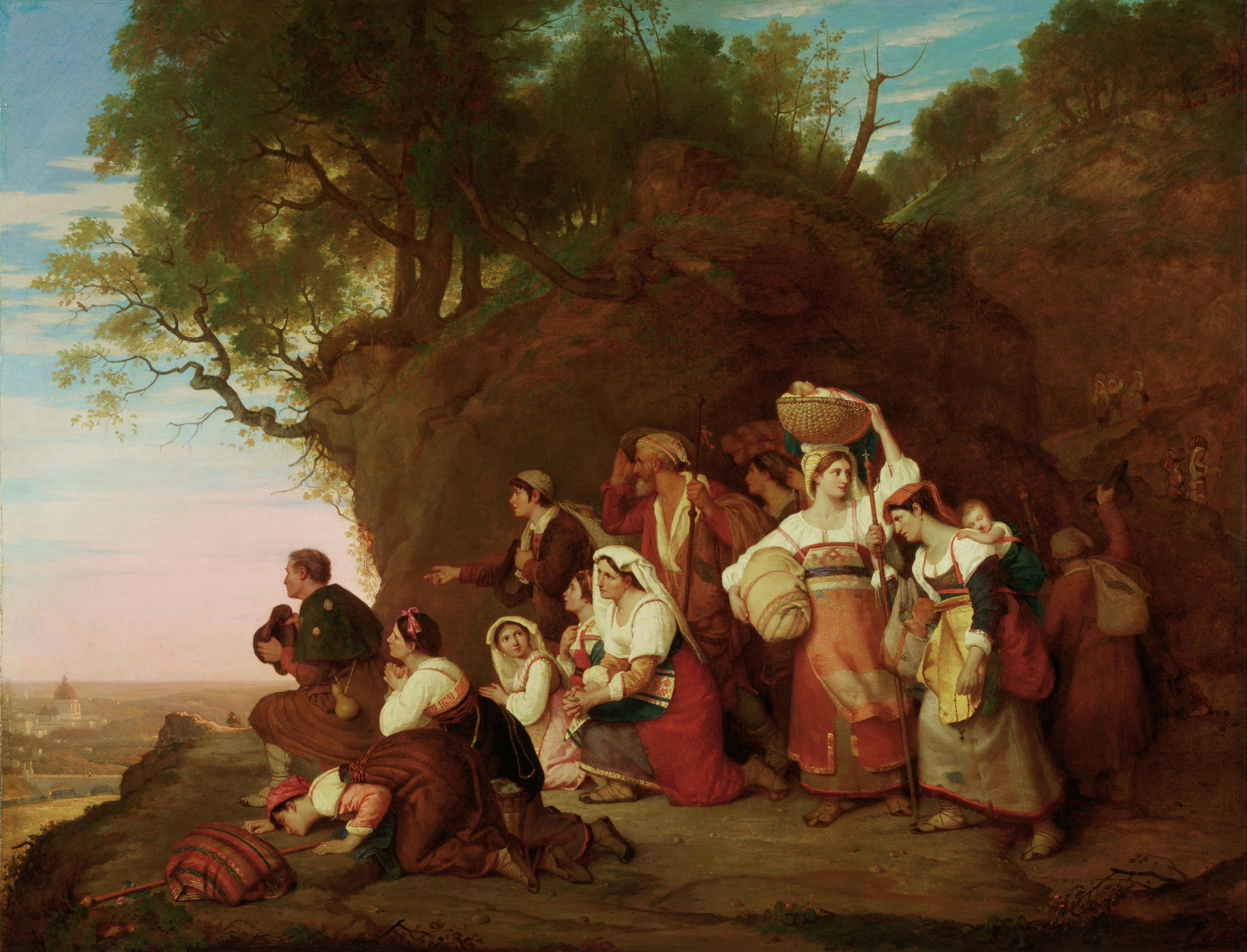
Pilgrims Arriving in Sight of Rome, 1827

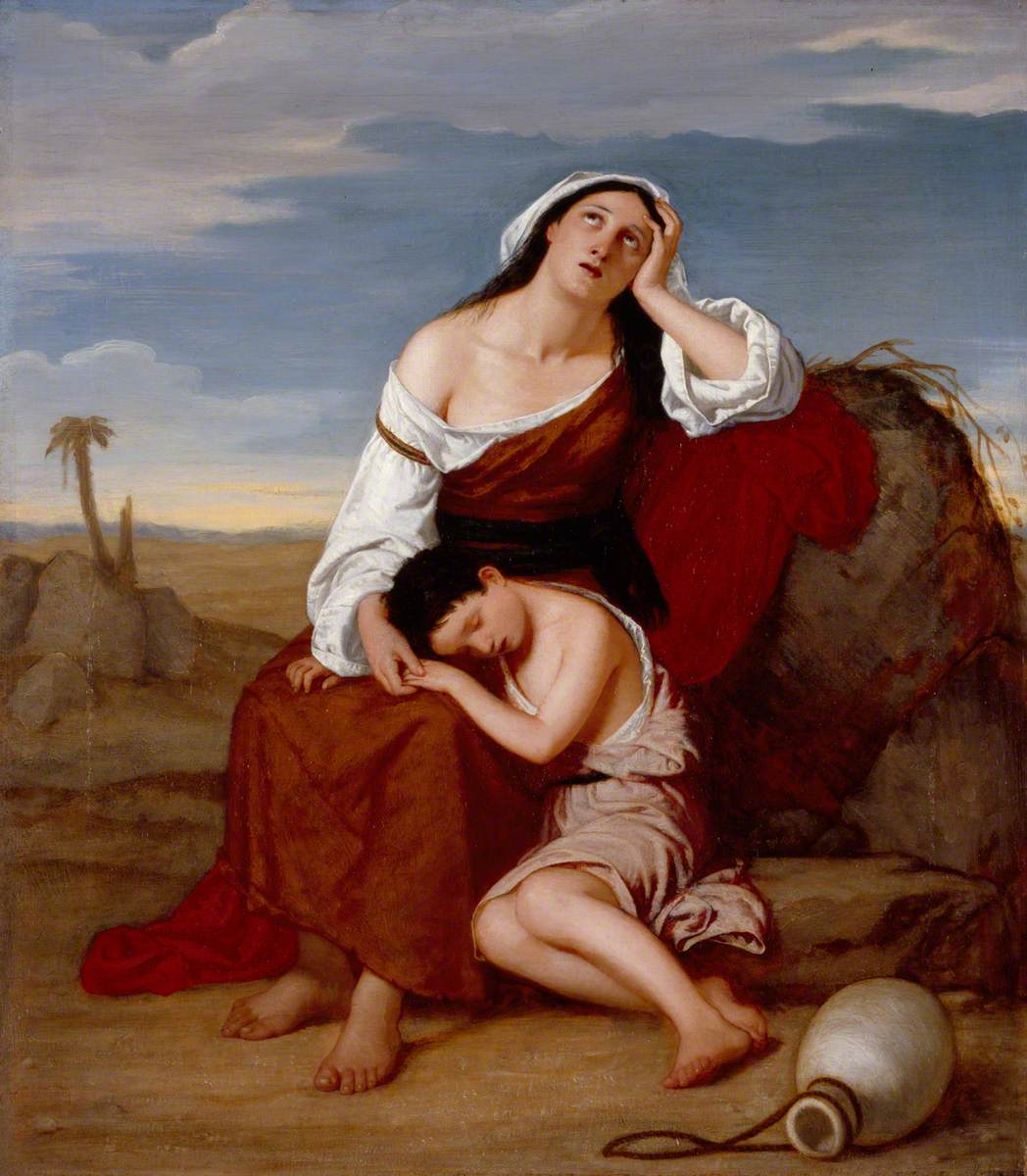
Hagar and Ishmael, 1830

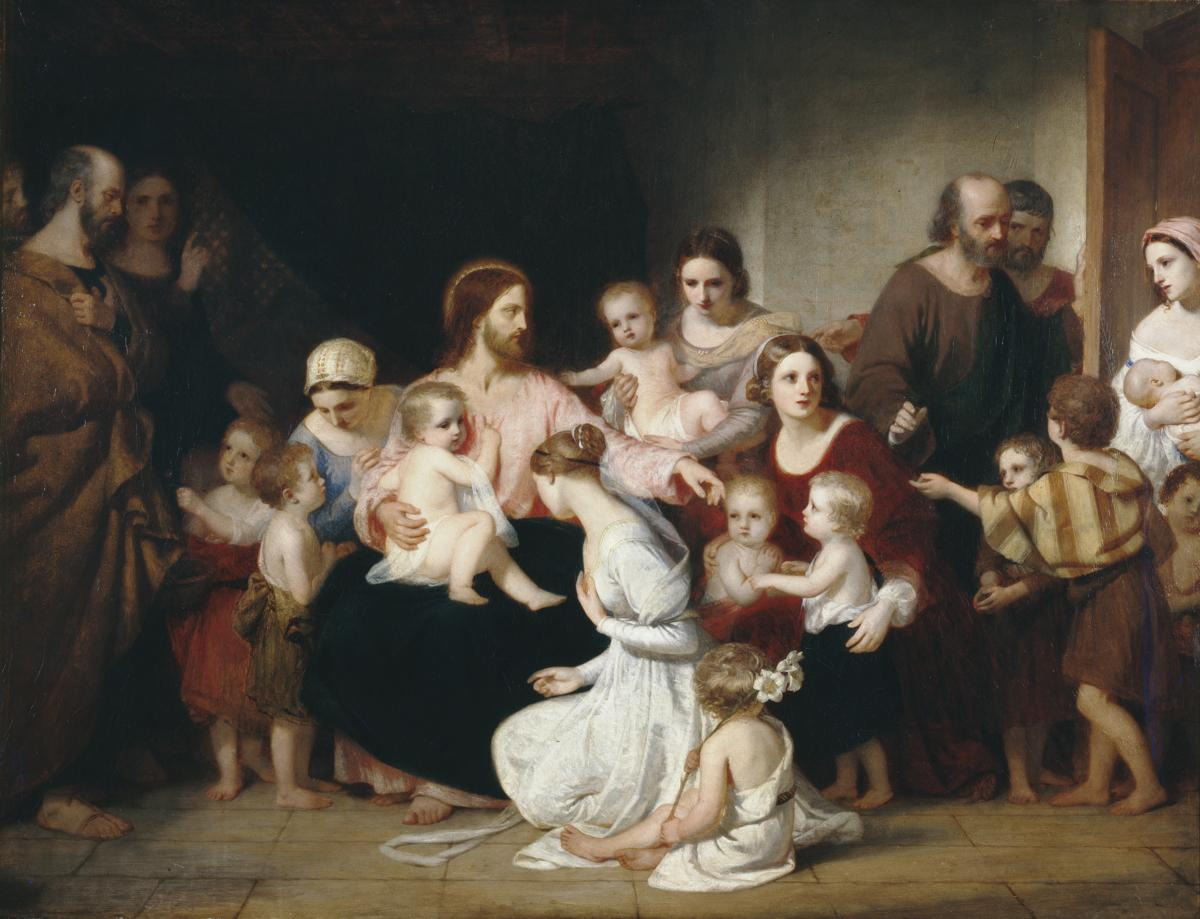
Christ Blessing Little Children, 1839

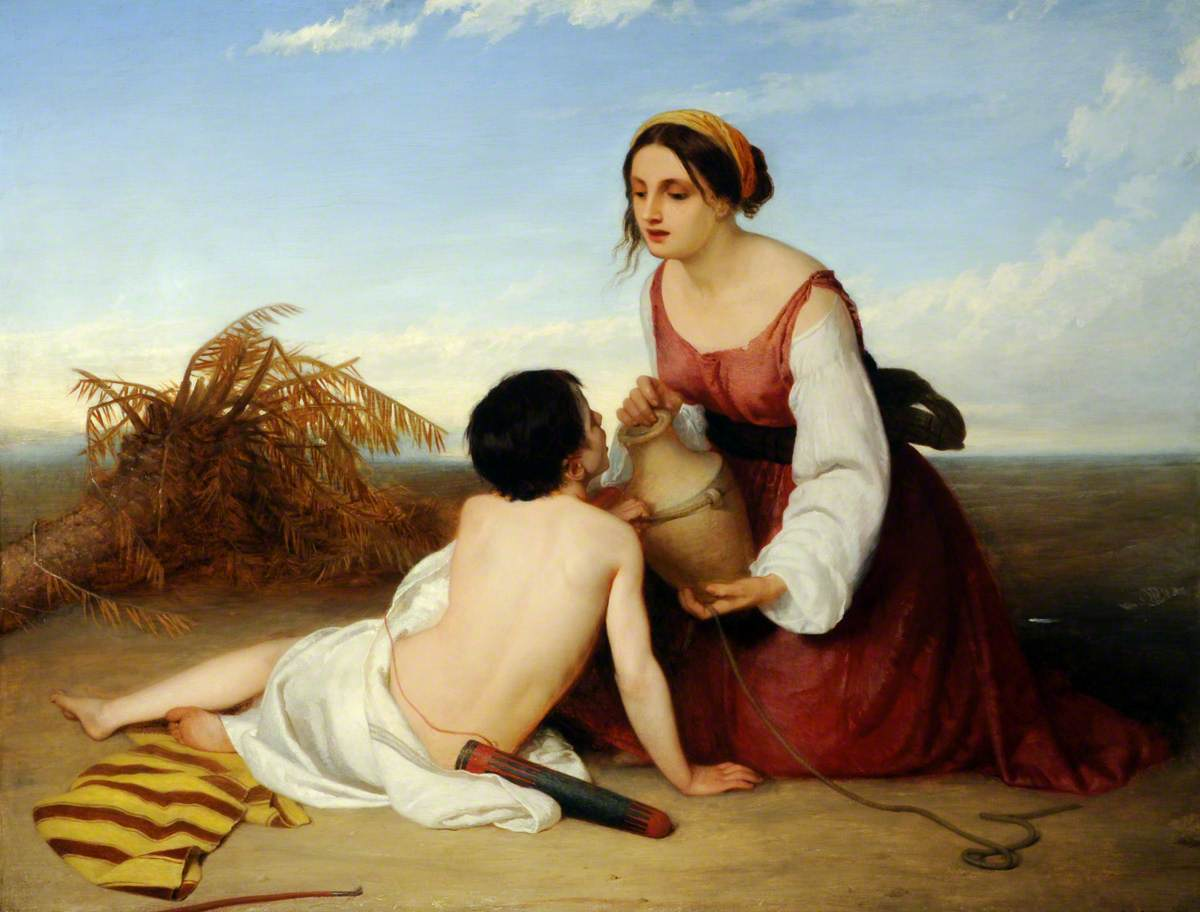
Hagar Offering Water to Her Son Ishmael in the Desert, 1842

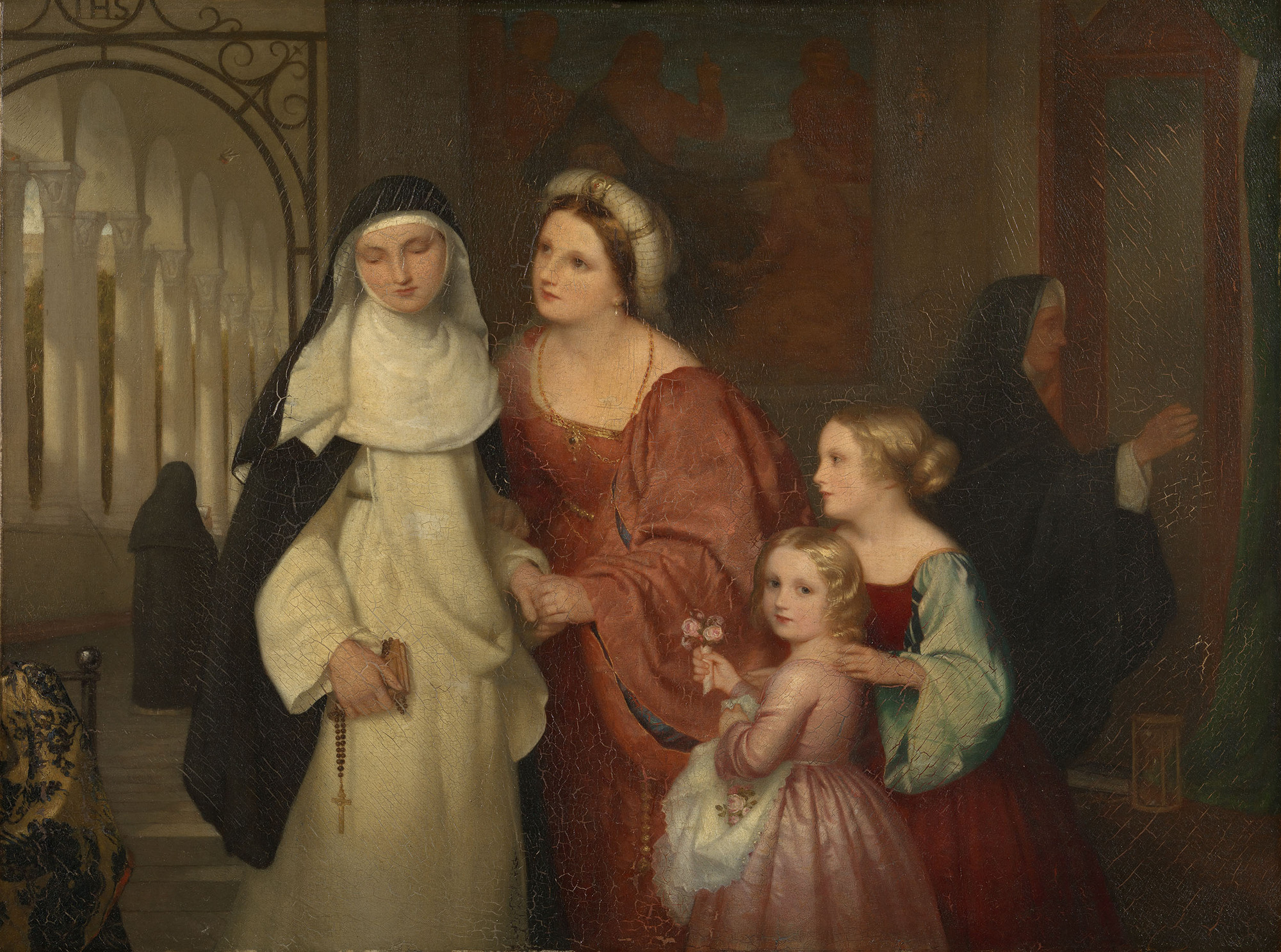
Zia Theresa: The Visit to the Nun, 1844

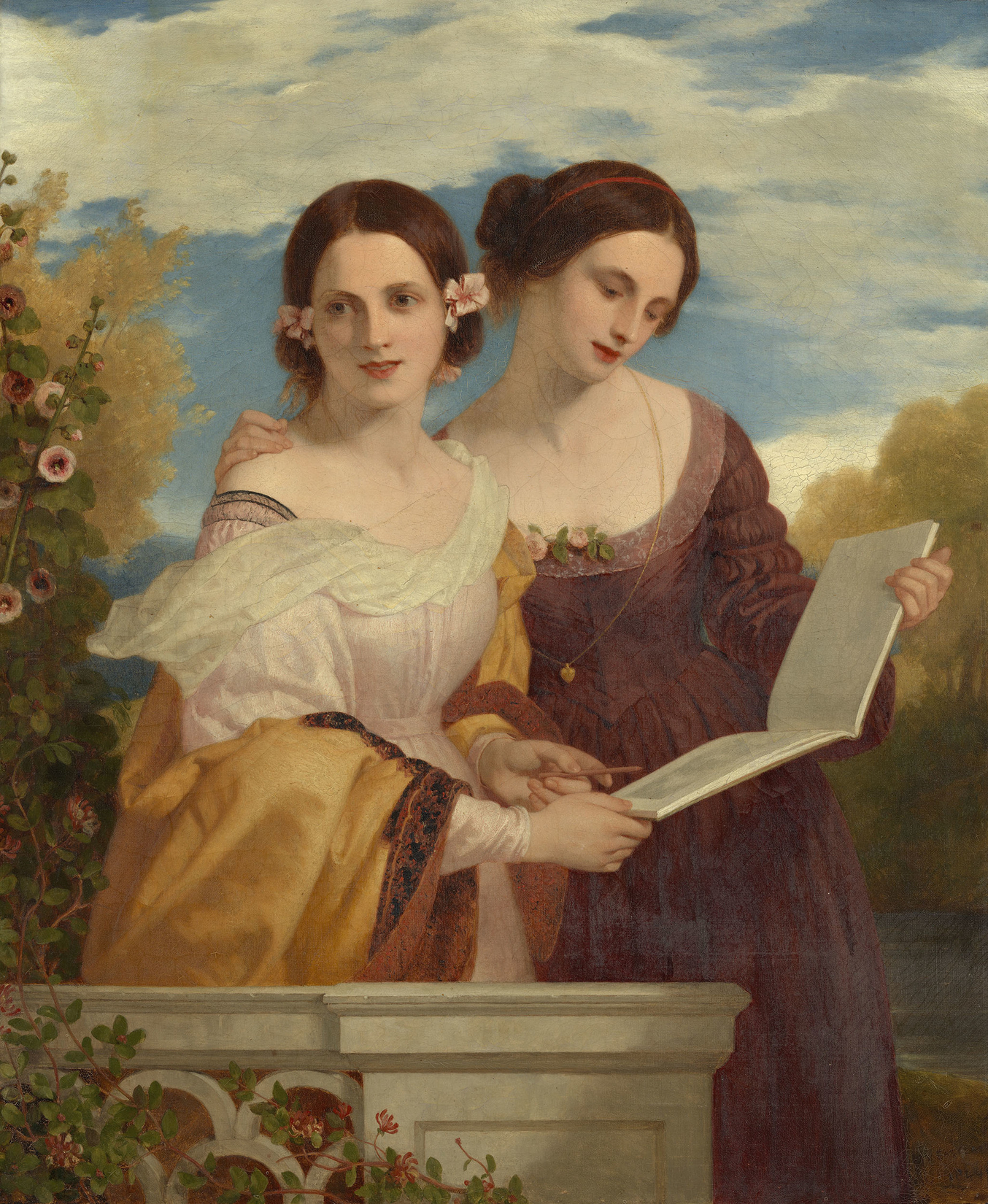
The Sisters, 1844

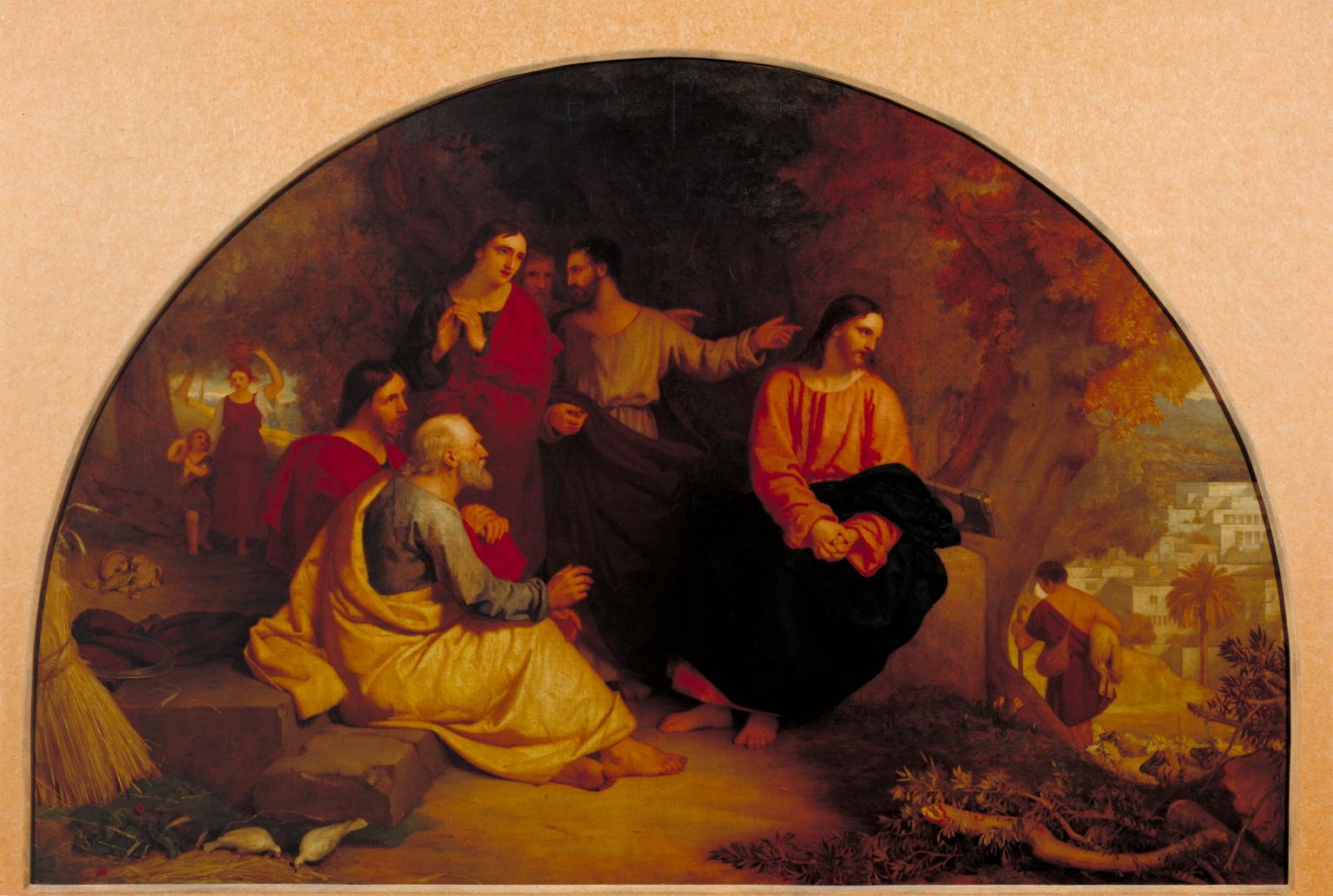
Christ Lamenting over Jerusalem, 1846, one of Eastlake's most popular biblical paintings.

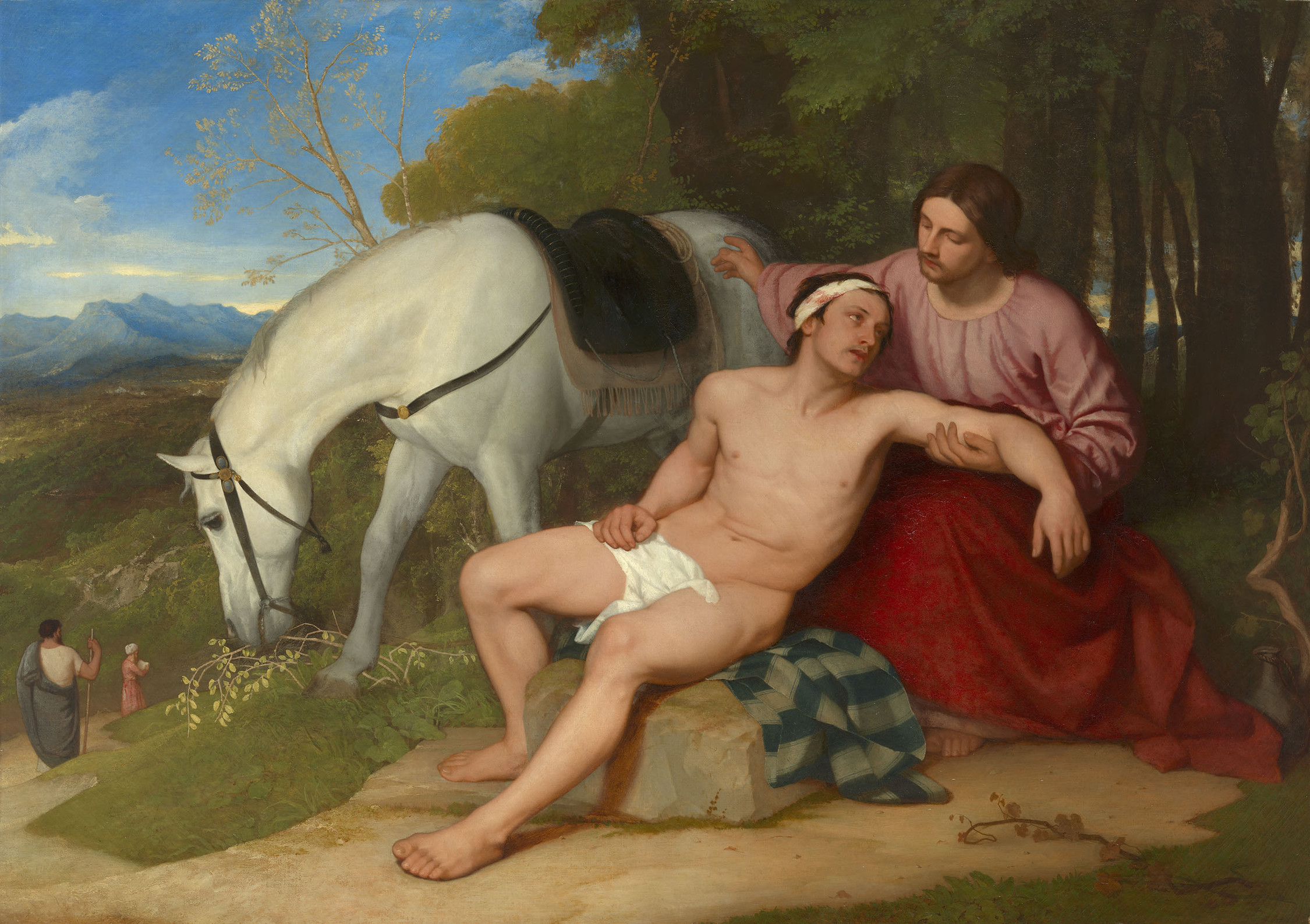
The Good Samaritan, 1850

== Publications ==
- Materials for a History of Oil Painting (1847). A second volume was published posthumously in 1869.
- Contributions to the Literature of the Fine Arts (1848).

== See also ==
- On Vision and Colours

Cultural offices
Preceded by Sir Martin Archer Shee	President of the Royal Academy; 1850–1865	Succeeded by Francis Grant
