= Óscar Domínguez =

Spanish painter (1906–1957)

- Óscar Domínguez
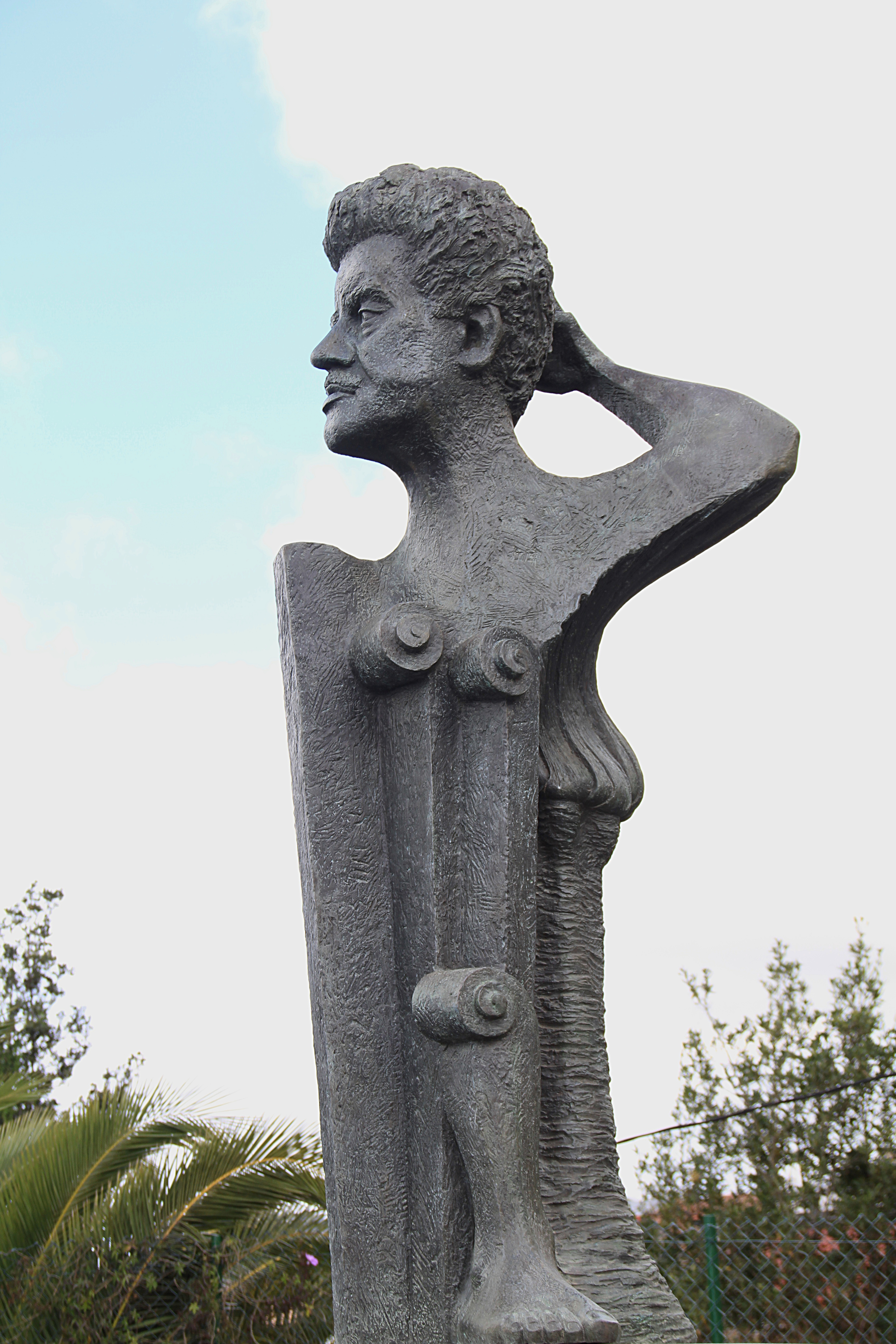
- A bust of Óscar Domínguez in Tenerife
- Born: 3 January 1906; San Cristóbal de La Laguna
- Died: 31 December 1957; Paris
- Resting place: Montparnasse Cemetery
- Occupations: Painter, sculptor, illustrator, photographer, textile artist

Óscar Domínguez

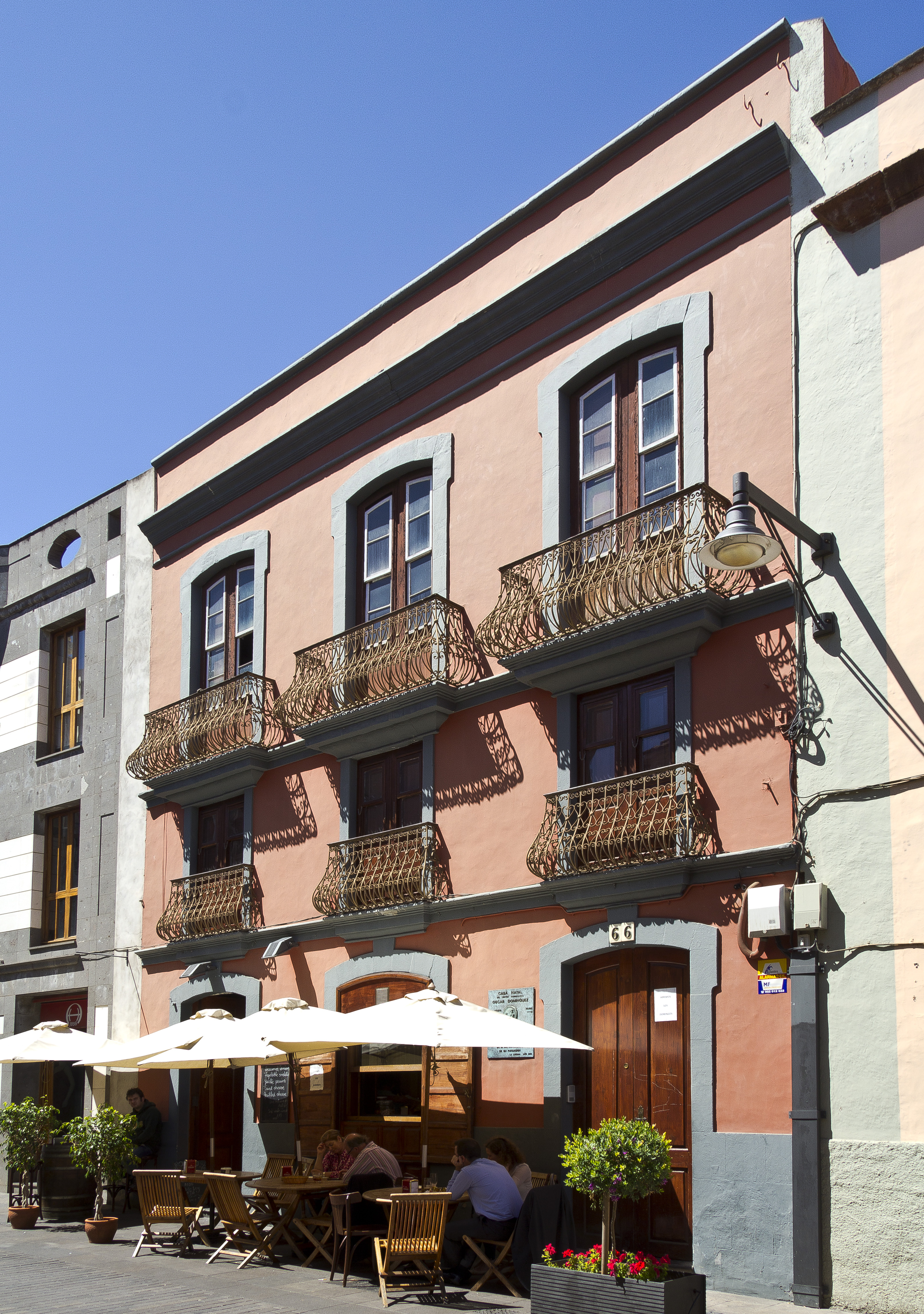
The house where Domínguez was born, in San Cristóbal de La Laguna

Óscar M. Domínguez (aka Oscar Dominguez, Oscar Domínguez Palazón, Oscar Manuel Domínguez Palazón, O. Domínguez, Oscar Manuel Domínguez) (3 January 1906 – 31 December 1957) was a Spanish-born French surrealist painter, commercial artist, tapestry designer, graphic artist, illustrator, photographer, sculptor and textile artist.

== Biography ==
Born in San Cristóbal de La Laguna on the island of Tenerife, on the Canary Islands Spain, Domínguez spent his youth with his grandmother in Tacoronte and devoted himself to painting at a young age after suffering a serious illness which affected his growth and caused a progressive deformation of his facial bone frame and limbs.

He went to Paris at age 21, where he first worked for his father in the central market of Les Halles, and spent his nights diving in cabarets. He frequented some art schools, and visited galleries and museums. He befriended members of the surrealist movement, such as Mary Stanley Low. He rapidly attracted avant-garde painters, notably Yves Tanguy and Pablo Picasso, whose influences were visible in his first works. At 25 he painted a self-portrait full of premonition as he showed himself with a deformed hand and with the veins of his arm cut. He chose to kill himself 27 years later by cutting his veins.

In 1933 Domínguez met André Breton, the main theoretician of Surrealism, and Paul Éluard, known as the poet of this movement, and took part a year later in the Surrealist exhibition held in Copenhagen and those of London and Tenerife in 1936. Domínguez was also working in Paris at the Atelier 17.

He popularized the Russian-invented technique of decalcomania as a Surrealist automatic technique in 1936, using gouache spread thinly on a sheet of paper or other surface (glass has been used), which is then pressed onto another surface such as a canvas. Automatism, invented by Andre Breton, was important for the Surrealists as a means of channeling their subconscious through art.

Domínguez's style influenced many artists, including Max Ernst, Hans Bellmer, Remedios Varo and Dutch poet and translator Gertrude Pape. His 1937 oil painting The Infernal Machine sold for 2 770 000 FF (US$404,375) on 8 June 2000 at Drouot-Montaigne in Paris.

His 1933 oil painting Retrato de Roma (Roma's Portrait) sold for 902,500 GBP (US$1,469,270) on 4 February 2014 at Christie's in London.

In 1952 he started an affair with Marie-Laure de Noailles née Bischoffsheim, who called him "putchie".

Domínguez committed suicide on 31 December 1957 by slitting his wrists in the bathtub. Marie-Laure arranged to have him interred in the Bischoffsheim family mausoleum in the Montparnasse cemetery in Paris.
