= José Carlos Cataño =

Spanish poet (born 1954)

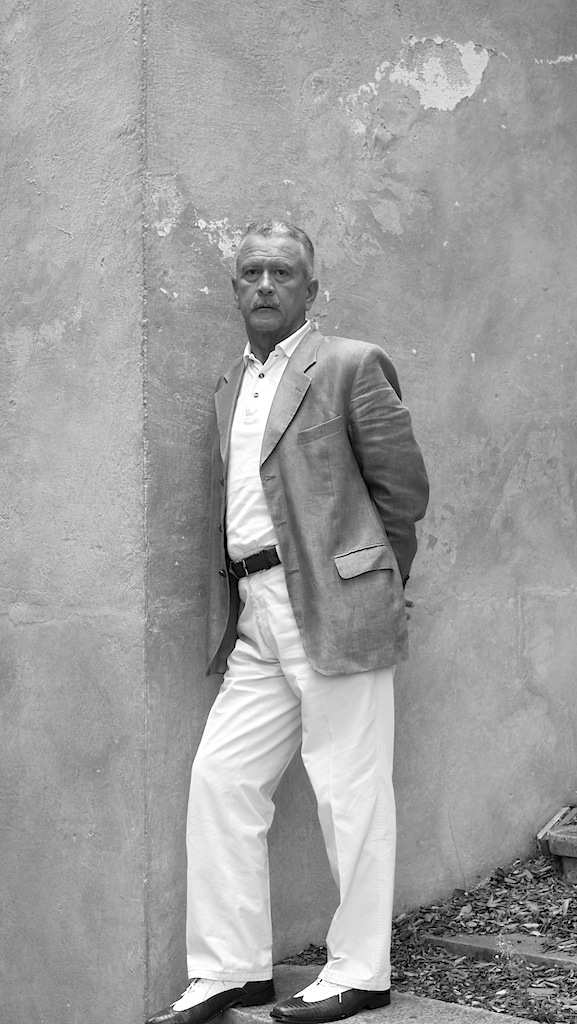
Photo of José Carlos Cataño

José Carlos Cataño (born 30 August 1954 in La Laguna, Canary Islands) is a Spanish poet.

== Bibliography ==
=== Poetry ===
- Jules Rock. 1973, L'Oreille Qui Voit Tout, Santa Cruz de Tenerife (1975)
- Disparos en el paraíso, Edicions del Mall, Barcelona (1982)
- Muerte sin ahí, Edicions del Mall, Barcelona (1986)
- El cónsul del mar del Norte, Editorial Pre-Textos, Valencia (1990)
- A las islas vacías, Ave del Paríso Ediciones, Madrid (1997)
- En tregua, Plaza & Janés, Barcelona (2001)
- El amor lejano. Poesía reunida, 1975-2005, Reverso Ediciones, Barcelona (2006)
- Lugares que fueron tu rostro (2000-2007), Editorial Bruguera, Barcelona (2008)

=== Prose ===
- El exterminio de la luz, Taller Ediciones Josefina Betancor, Madrid (1975), Premio de Edición Benito Pérez Armas de Novela 1974
- De tu boca a los cielos, Edicions del Mall, Barcelona (1985) y Anroart, Las Palmas de Gran Canaria (2007), segunda edición, revisada y corregida
- Madame, Ediciones Península, Barcelona (1989)
- Los que cruzan el mar. Diarios, 1974-2004, Editorial Pre-Textos, Valencia (2004)
- Aurora y exilio. Escritos, 1980-2006, La Caja Literaria, Santa Cruz de Tenerife, (2007)
- Cien de Canarias. Una lectura de la poesía insular entre 1950 y 2000, Ediciones Idea, Colección Cabrera y Galdós, Santa Cruz de Tenerife, (2008)
