= Napoleon on the Bellerophon =

1815 painting by Charles Lock Eastlake

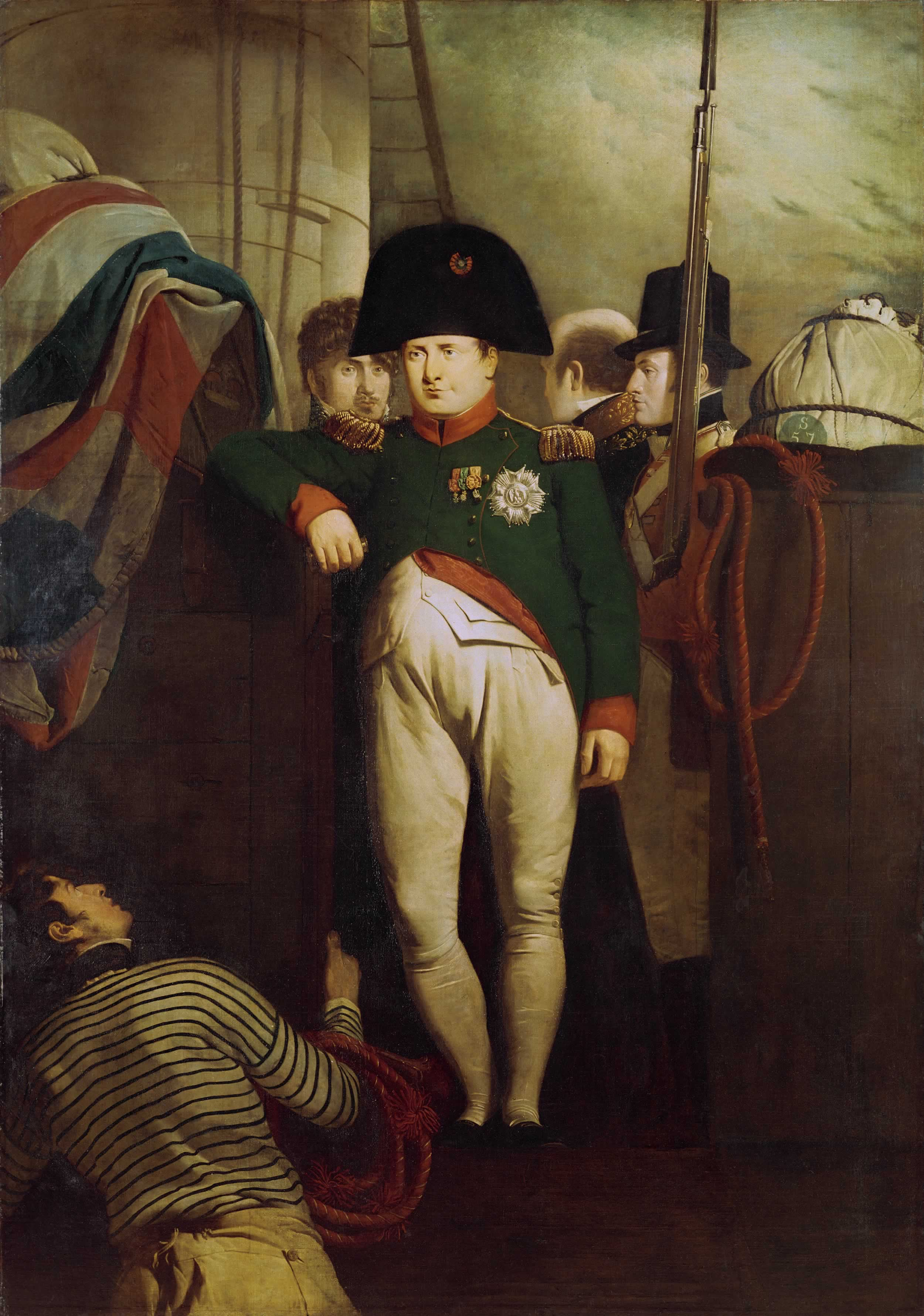
- Artist: Charles Lock Eastlake
- Year: 1815
- Type: Oil on canvas, Portrait
- Dimensions: 260 cm × 179 cm (102 in × 70.4 in)
- Location: National Maritime Museum, London

Napoleon on the Bellerophon, also known by its longer title Napoleon on Board the Bellerophon in Plymouth Sound, is an oil on canvas painting by British artist Charles Lock Eastlake, from 1815. It is held in the National Maritime Museum in Greenwich.

== History and description ==
The painting depicts the deposed Emperor of the French Napoleon as a prisoner aboard the Royal Navy ship of the line HMS Bellerophon in Plymouth Sound. Its artist, Eastlake, was a young, largely unknown artist at the time, before becoming President of the Royal Academy.

After his defeat at the Battle of Waterloo and his second abdication following the Hundred Days campaign, Napoleon tried to escape to the United States but surrendered to Bellerophon on 14 July 1815. While a decision was made by the Congress of Vienna about his future, he was brought to Plymouth.

While held off Plymouth, large crowds gathered on the shore. Eastlake hired a boat and rowed out towards the ship to study Napoleon. His painting portrays Napoleon standing at a gangway of Bellerophon in the uniform of a colonel of the chasseurs à cheval. He appears as a great figure of history, somewhat heroic, although the draped Union Jack on the left of the picture emphasises his status as a prisoner of the victorious British. A Royal Marine stands guard to the right.

Napoleon was ultimately taken to his final place of captivity, the island of Saint Helena in the Atlantic Ocean.

The painting was a popular success, financially allowing Eastlake to travel in Europe studying Old Masters in continental galleries.

== Bibliography ==
- Carruthers, K. A. Napoleon on Campaign: Classic Images of Napoleon at War. Pen and Sword, 2014. ISBN 978-1-4738-4941-9.
- Hartley, Lucy. Democratising Beauty in Nineteenth-Century Britain: Art and the Politics of Public Life. Cambridge University Press, 2017.
- Kemp, David. The Pleasures and Treasures of Britain: A Discerning Traveller's Companion. Dundurn, 1992. ISBN 978-1-55002-159-2.
