= Banish (disambiguation) =

To banish means to exile, to send away, or to expel.

Banish or banishment may also refer to:

- Banish (brand), an American brand of skincare products
- Banish (herbicide), a British brand name of aminopyralid
- Banish, a variant spelling of Banesh, a village in Iran
- Banishing, a magical ritual to remove non-physical influences
- The Banishment, a 2008 film by Andrey Zvyagintsev
- Banishment in the Torah
- Banishment Act, Irish act of 1697
- Massachusetts Banishment Act, American act of 1778

== People with the name ==
- Fran Banish, musician on At Ground Zero etc.

== See also ==
- Banished (disambiguation)
