= Excommunication =

Censure used to deprive, suspend, or limit membership in a religious community

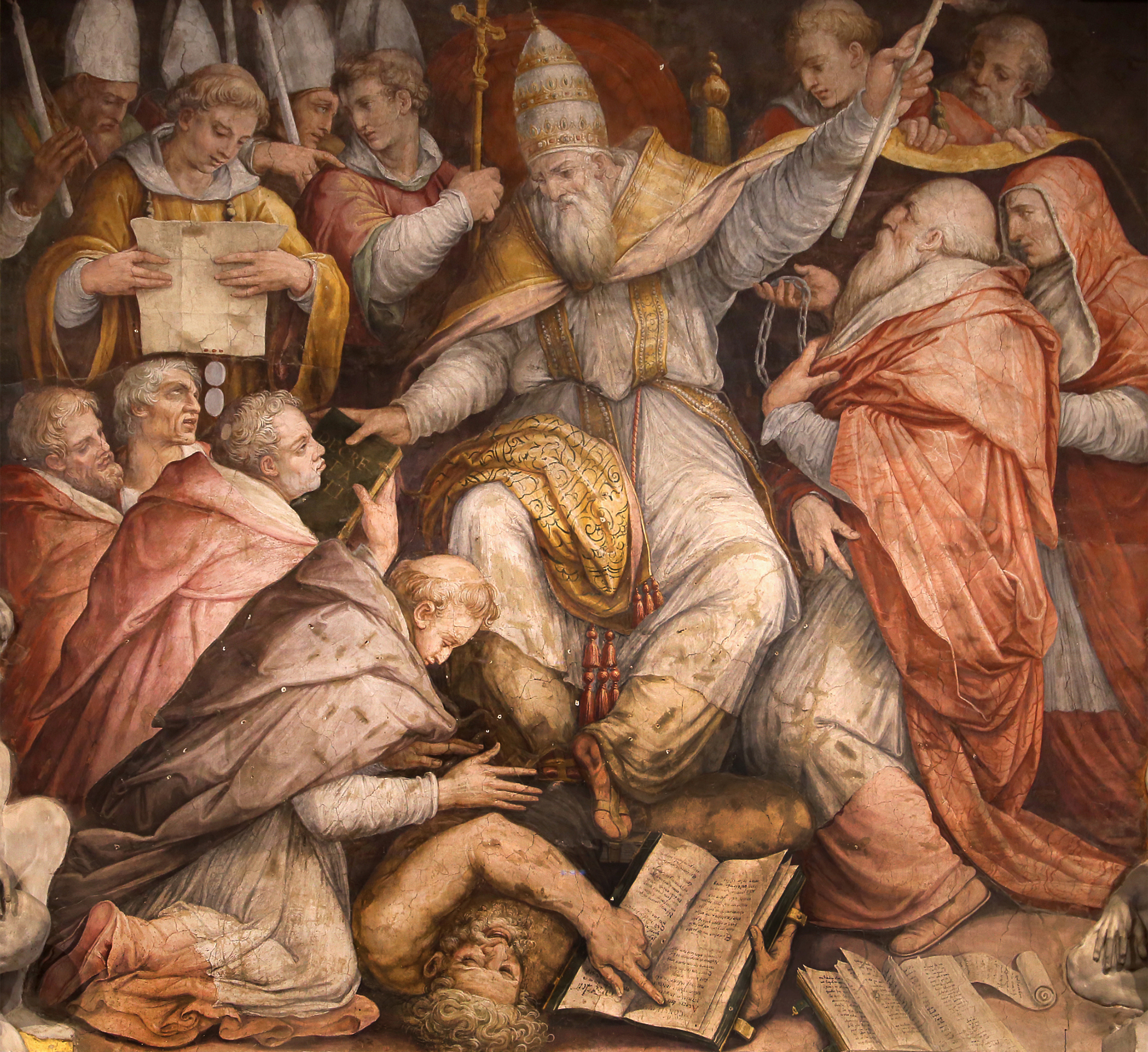
Fanciful 16th-century fresco in the Sala Regia, by Giorgio Vasari, depicting Pope Gregory IX excommunicating Frederick II. Since few details were provided to the artist, Vasari chose to paint an excommunication scene generically. In the traditional excommunication procedure, the pope and his priests would hurl burning candles on the ground and stamp them out. The painter however here chose to show the pope personally stepping on the emperor.

Excommunication is an institutional act of religious censure used to deprive, suspend, or limit membership in a religious community or to restrict certain rights within it, in particular those of being in communion with other members of the congregation, and of receiving the sacraments.

It is practiced by all of the ancient churches (such as the Catholic Church, Oriental Orthodox churches and the Eastern Orthodox churches) as well as by other Christian denominations; however, it is also used more generally to refer to similar types of institutional religious exclusionary practices and shunning among other religious groups. The Amish have also been known to excommunicate members that were either seen or known for breaking rules, or questioning the church, a practice known as shunning. Jehovah's Witnesses use the term disfellowship to refer to their form of excommunication.

The word excommunication means putting a specific individual or group out of communion. In some denominations, excommunication includes spiritual condemnation of the member or group. Excommunication may involve banishment, shunning, and shaming, depending on the group, the offense that caused excommunication, or the rules or norms of the religious community. The grave act is often revoked in response to manifest repentance.

== Bahá'í Faith ==
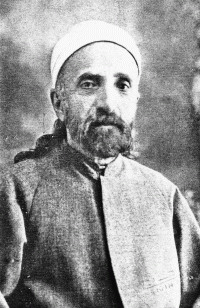
Mírzá Muhammad ʻAlí, son of Bahá'u'lláh was excommunicated by 'Abdu'l-Bahá.

Excommunication among Bahá'ís is rare and generally not used for transgressions of community standards, intellectual dissent, or conversion to other religions. Instead, it is the most severe punishment, reserved for suppressing organized dissent that threatens the unity of believers. Covenant-breaker is a term used by Bahá'ís to refer to a person who has been excommunicated from the Bahá'í community for breaking the 'Covenant': actively promoting schism in the religion or otherwise opposing the legitimacy of the chain of succession of leadership.

Currently, the Universal House of Justice has the sole authority to declare a person a Covenant-breaker, and once identified, all Bahá'ís are expected to shun them, even if they are family members. According to 'Abdu'l Baha Covenant-breaking is a contagious disease. The Bahá'í writings forbid association with Covenant-breakers and Bahá'ís are urged to avoid their literature, thus providing an exception to the Bahá'í principle of independent investigation of truth. Most Bahá'ís are unaware of the small Bahá'í divisions that exist.

== Christianity ==
The purpose of excommunication is to exclude from the church those members who have behaviors or teachings contrary to the beliefs of a Christian community (heresy). It aims to protect members of the church from abuses and allow the offender to recognize their error and repent.

=== Catholic Church ===
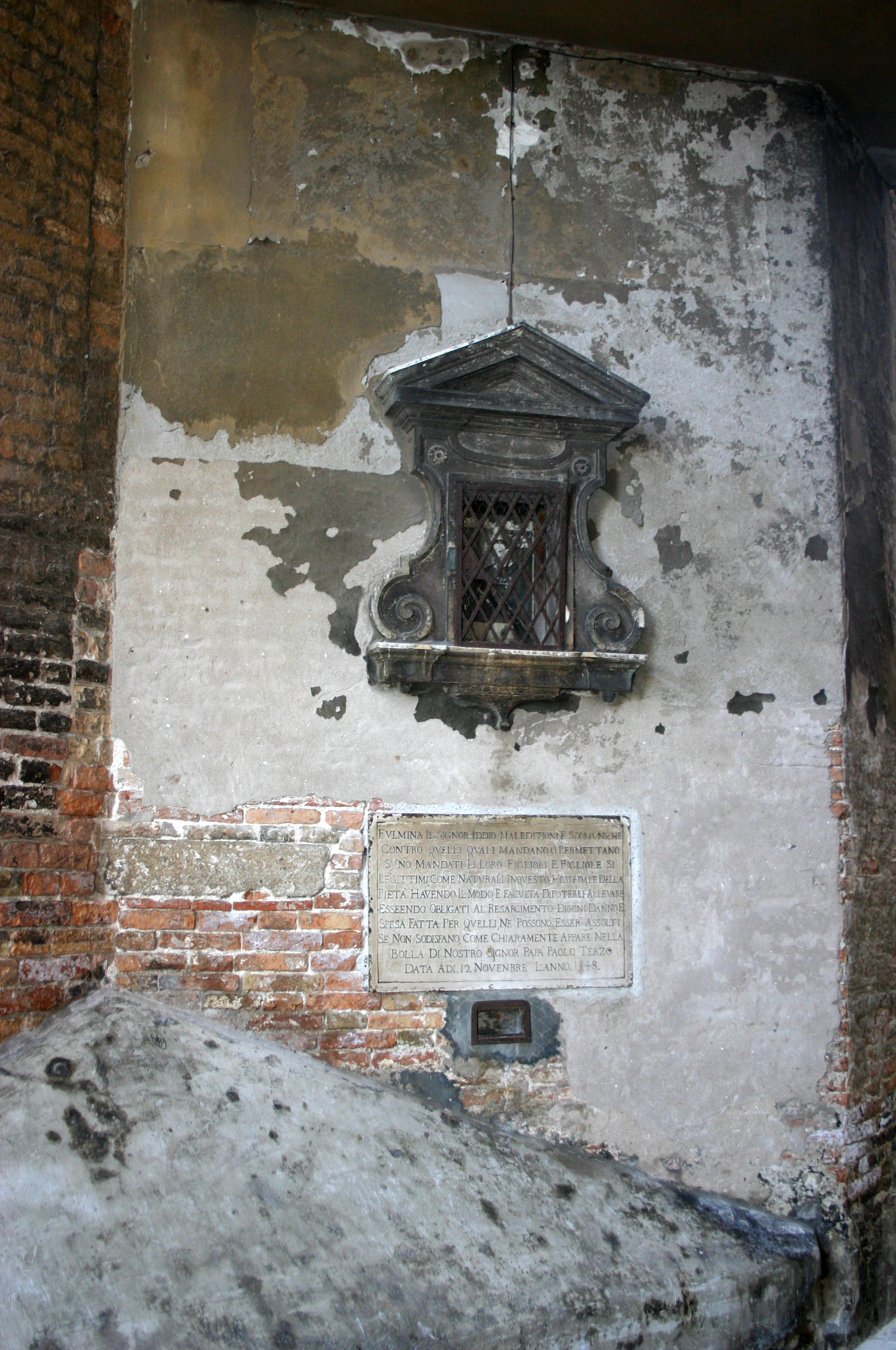
Plaque on exterior of the Chiesa della Pietà in Venice, the church of the orphanage. This is where the foundling wheel once stood. The inscription declares, citing a 12 November 1548 papal bull of Pope Paul III, that God inflicts "maledictions and excommunications" on all who abandon a child of theirs whom they have the means to rear, and that they cannot be absolved unless they first refund all expenses incurred.

Within the Catholic Church, there are differences between the discipline of the majority Latin Church regarding excommunication and that of the Eastern Catholic Churches.

==== Latin Church ====
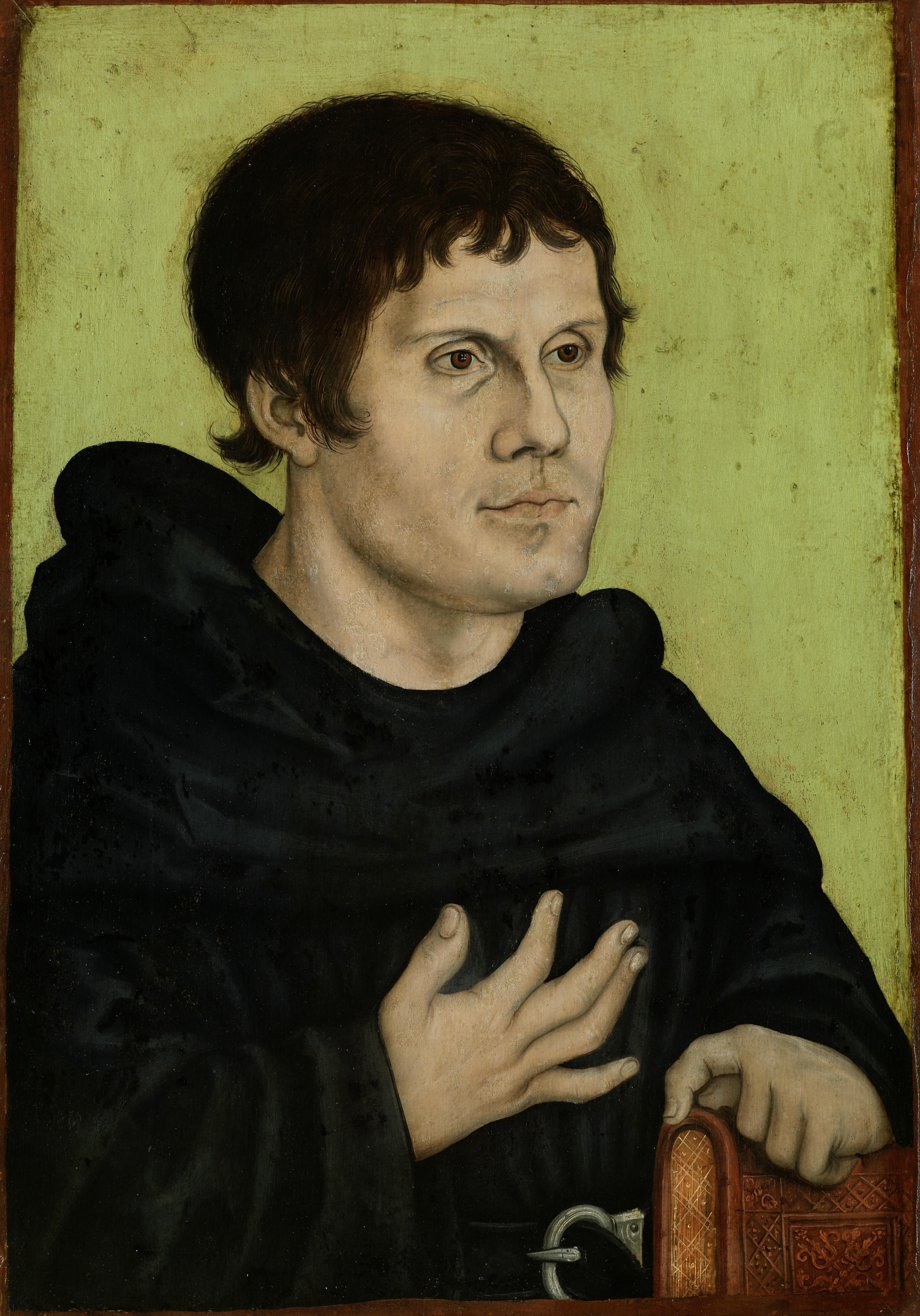
Martin Luther was excommunicated by Pope Leo X in 1521.

Excommunication can be either latae sententiae (automatic, incurred at the moment of committing the offense for which canon law imposes that penalty) or ferendae sententiae (incurred only when imposed by a legitimate superior or declared as the sentence of an ecclesiastical court).

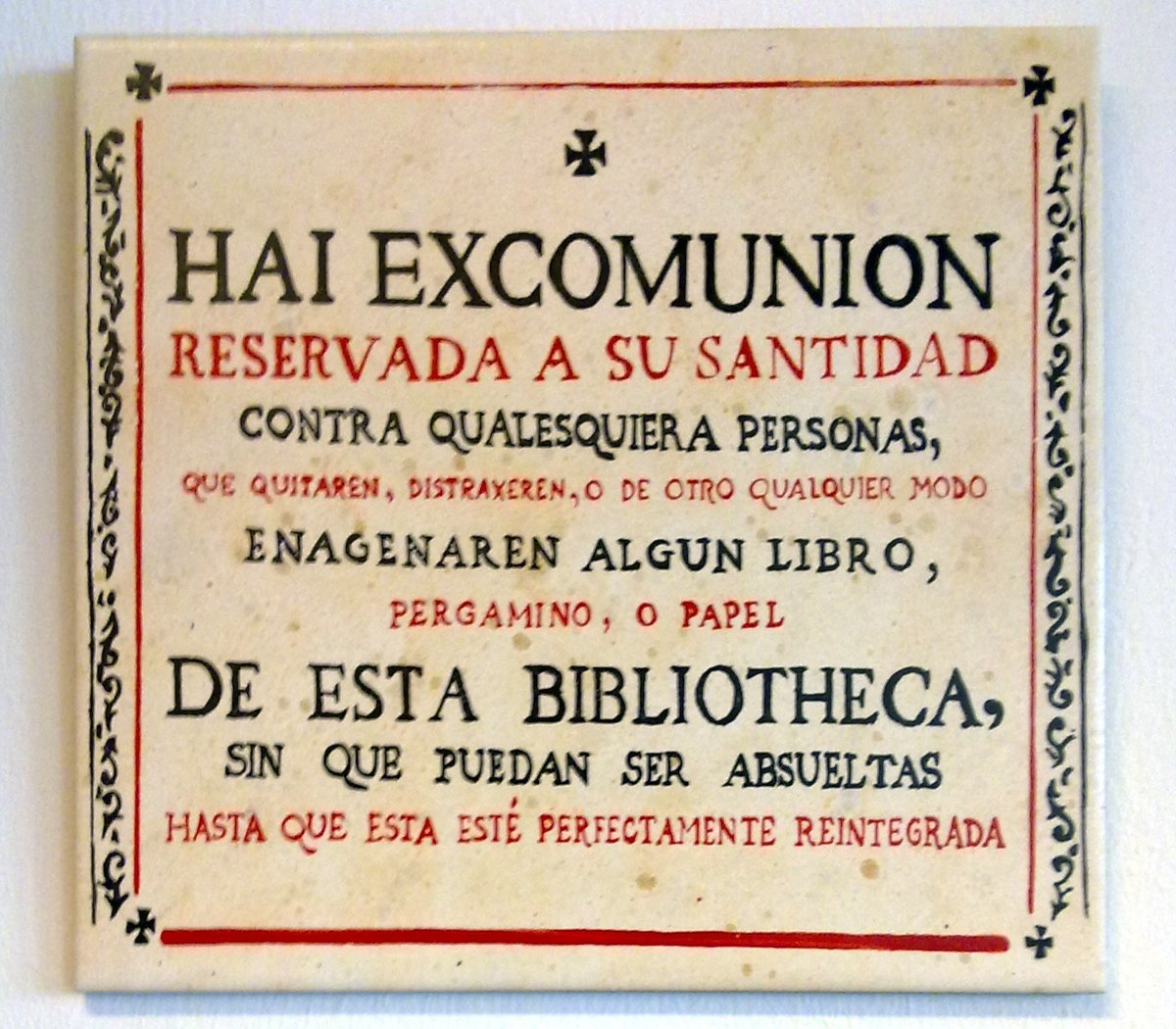
Threat of excommunication for stealing books from the Salamanca University library

The Catholic Church teaches in the Council of Trent that "excommunicated persons are not members of the Church, because they have been cut off by her sentence from the number of her children and belong not to her communion until they repent".

In the papal bull Exsurge Domine (May 16, 1520), Pope Leo X condemned Luther's twenty-third proposition according to which "excommunications are merely external punishments, nor do they deprive a man of the common spiritual prayers of the Church". Pope Pius VI in Auctorem Fidei (August 28, 1794) condemned the notion which maintained that the effect of excommunication is only exterior because of its own nature it excludes only from exterior communion with the Church, as if, said the pope, excommunication were not a spiritual penalty binding in heaven and affecting souls. The excommunicated person, being excluded from the society of the Church, still bears the indelible mark of Baptism and is subject to the jurisdiction of the Church. They are excluded from engaging in certain activities. These activities are listed in Canon 1331 §1, and prohibit the individual from any ministerial participation in celebrating the sacrifice of the Eucharist or any other ceremonies of worship; celebrating or receiving the sacraments; or exercising any ecclesiastical offices, ministries, or functions.

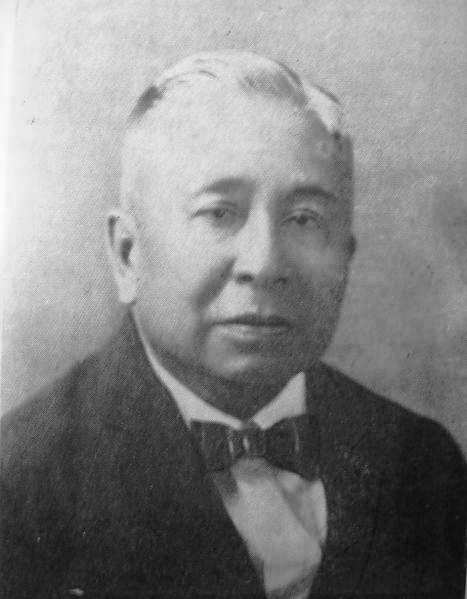
Isabelo de los Reyes, founder of the Aglipayan Church, was excommunicated by Pope Leo XIII in 1903 as a schismatic apostate.

Under current Catholic canon law, excommunicates remain bound by ecclesiastical obligations such as attending Mass, even though they are barred from receiving the Eucharist and from taking an active part in the liturgy (reading, bringing the offerings, etc.). "Excommunicates lose rights, such as the right to the sacraments, but they are still bound to the obligations of the law; their rights are restored when they are reconciled through the remission of the penalty."

These are the only effects for those who have incurred a latae sententiae excommunication. For instance, a priest may not refuse Communion publicly to those who are under an automatic excommunication, as long as it has not been officially declared to have been incurred by them, even if the priest knows that they have incurred it—although if the person's offence was a "manifest grave sin", then the priest is obliged to refuse their communion by canon 915. On the other hand, if the priest knows that excommunication has been imposed on someone or that an automatic excommunication has been declared (and is no longer merely an undeclared automatic excommunication), he is forbidden to administer Holy Communion to that person.

In the Catholic Church, excommunication is normally resolved by a declaration of repentance, profession of the Creed (if the offense involved heresy) and an Act of Faith, or renewal of obedience (if that was a relevant part of the offending act, i.e., an act of schism) by the excommunicated person and the lifting of the censure (absolution) by a priest or bishop empowered to do this. "The absolution can be in the internal (private) forum only, or also in the external (public) forum, depending on whether scandal would be given if a person were privately absolved and yet publicly considered unrepentant."

==== Eastern Catholic Churches ====
In the Eastern Catholic Churches, excommunication is imposed only by decree, never incurred automatically by latae sententiae excommunication. A distinction is made between minor and major excommunication. Those on whom minor excommunication has been imposed are excluded from receiving the Eucharist and can also be excluded from participating in the Divine Liturgy. They can even be excluded from entering a church when divine worship is being celebrated there. The decree of excommunication must indicate the precise effect of the excommunication and, if required, its duration.

Those under major excommunication are in addition forbidden to receive not only the Eucharist but also the other sacraments, to administer sacraments or sacramentals, to exercise any ecclesiastical offices, ministries, or functions whatsoever, and any such exercise by them is null and void. They are to be removed from participation in the Divine Liturgy and any public celebrations of divine worship. They are forbidden to make use of any privileges granted to them and cannot be given any dignity, office, ministry, or function in the church, they cannot receive any pension or emoluments associated with these dignities etc., and they are deprived of the right to vote or to be elected.

=== Eastern Orthodox Church ===
In the Eastern Orthodox Church, excommunication is the exclusion of a member from the Eucharist. It is not expulsion from the churches. This can happen for such reasons as not having confessed within that year; excommunication can also be imposed as part of a penitential period. It is generally done with the goal of restoring the member to full communion. Before an excommunication of significant duration is imposed, the bishop is usually consulted. The Eastern Orthodox do have a means of expulsion, by pronouncing anathema, but this is reserved only for acts of serious and unrepentant heresy. As an example of this, the Second Council of Constantinople in 553, in its eleventh capitula, declared: "If anyone does not anathematize Arius, Eunomius, Macedonius, Apollinaris, Nestorius, Eutyches and Origen, as well as their impious writings, as also all other heretics already condemned and anathematized by the Holy Catholic and Apostolic Church, and by the aforesaid four Holy Synods and [if anyone does not equally anathematize] all those who have held and hold or who in their impiety persist in holding to the end the same opinion as those heretics just mentioned: let him be anathema."

=== Lutheran churches ===
Although Lutheranism technically has an excommunication process, some denominations and congregations do not use it. In the Smalcald Articles Luther differentiates between the "great" and "small" excommunication. The "small" excommunication is simply barring an individual from the Lord's Supper and "other fellowship in the church". While the "great" excommunication excluded a person from both the church and political communities which he considered to be outside the authority of the church and only for civil leaders. A modern Lutheran practice is laid out in the Lutheran Church–Missouri Synod's 1986 explanation to the Small Catechism, defined beginning at Questions No. 277–284, in "The Office of Keys".

Many Lutheran denominations operate under the premise that the entire congregation (as opposed to the pastor alone) must take appropriate steps for excommunication, and there are not always precise rules, to the point where individual congregations often set out rules for excommunicating laymen (as opposed to clergy). For example, churches may sometimes require that a vote must be taken at Sunday services; some congregations require that this vote be unanimous.

In the Church of Sweden and the Church of Denmark, excommunicated individuals are turned out from their parish in front of their congregation. They are not forbidden, however, to attend church and participate in other acts of devotion, although they are to sit in a place appointed by the priest (which was at a distance from others).

The Lutheran process, though rarely used, has created unusual situations in recent years due to its somewhat democratic excommunication process. One example was an effort to get serial killer Dennis Rader excommunicated from his denomination (the Evangelical Lutheran Church in America) by individuals who tried to "lobby" Rader's fellow church members into voting for his excommunication.

=== Anglican Communion ===
==== Church of England ====
The Church of England does not have any specific canons regarding how or why a member can be excommunicated, although it has a canon according to which ecclesiastical burial may be refused to someone "declared excommunicate for some grievous and notorious crime and no man to testify to his repentance".

The punishment of imprisonment for being excommunicated from the Church of England was removed from English law in 1963.

Historian Christopher Hill found that, in pre-revolutionary England, excommunication was common but fell into disrepute because it was applied unevenly and could be avoided on payment of fines.

==== Episcopal Church of the United States of America ====
The ECUSA is in the Anglican Communion, and shares many canons with the Church of England, which would determine its policy on excommunication.

=== Reformed churches ===
In the Reformed Churches, excommunication has generally been seen as the culmination of church discipline, which is one of the three marks of the Church. The Westminster Confession of Faith sees it as the third step after "admonition" and "suspension from the sacrament of the Lord's Supper for a season." Yet, John Calvin argues in his Institutes of the Christian Religion that church censures do not "consign those who are excommunicated to perpetual ruin and damnation", but are designed to induce repentance, reconciliation and restoration to communion. Calvin notes, "though ecclesiastical discipline does not allow us to be on familiar and intimate terms with excommunicated persons, still we ought to strive by all possible means to bring them to a better mind, and recover them to the fellowship and unity of the Church."

At least one modern Reformed theologian argues that excommunication is not the final step in the disciplinary process. Jay E. Adams argues that in excommunication, the offender is still seen as a brother, but in the final step they become "as the heathen and tax collector" (Matthew 18:17). Adams writes, "Nowhere in the Bible is excommunication (removal from the fellowship of the Lord's Table, according to Adams) equated with what happens in step 5; rather, step 5 is called 'removing from the midst, handing over to Satan,' and the like."

Former Princeton president and theologian, Jonathan Edwards, addresses the notion of excommunication as "removal from the fellowship of the Lord's Table" in his treatise entitled "The Nature and End of Excommunication". Edwards argues:

"Particularly, we are forbidden such a degree of associating ourselves with (excommunicants), as there is in making them our guests at our tables, or in being their guests at their tables; as is manifest in the text, where we are commanded to have no company with them, no not to eat [...] That this respects not eating with them at the Lord's supper, but a common eating, is evident by the words, that the eating here forbidden, is one of the lowest degrees of keeping company, which are forbidden. Keep no company with such a one, saith the apostle, no not to eat – as much as to say, no not in so low a degree as to eat with him. But eating with him at the Lord's supper, is the very highest degree of visible Christian communion. Who can suppose that the apostle meant this: Take heed and have no company with a man, no not so much as in the highest degree of communion that you can have? Besides, the apostle mentions this eating as a way of keeping company which, however, they might hold with the heathen. He tells them not to keep company with fornicators. Then he informs them, he means not with fornicators of this world, that is, the heathens; but, saith he, 'if any man that is called a brother be a fornicator, etc. with such a one keep no company, no not to eat.' This makes it most apparent, that the apostle doth not mean eating at the Lord's table; for so, they might not keep company with the heathens, any more than with an excommunicated person".

=== Methodism ===
In the Methodist Episcopal Church, individuals were able to be excommunicated following "trial before a jury of his peers, and after having had the privilege of an appeal to a higher court". Nevertheless, an excommunication could be lifted after sufficient penance.

John Wesley, the founder of the Methodist Churches, excommunicated sixty-four members from the Newcastle Methodist society alone for the following reasons:

Two for cursing and swearing.

Two for habitual Sabbath-breaking.
Seventeen for drunkenness.
Two for retailing spiritous liquors.
Three for quarrelling and brawling.
One for beating his wife.
Three for habitual, wilful lying.
Four for railing and evil-speaking.
One for idleness and laziness. And,

Nine-and-twenty for lightness and carelessness.

The Allegheny Wesleyan Methodist Connection, in its 2014 Discipline, includes "homosexuality, lesbianism, bi-sexuality, bestiality, incest, fornication, adultery, and any attempt to alter one's gender by surgery", as well as remarriage after divorce among its excommunicable offences.

The Evangelical Wesleyan Church, in its 2015 Discipline, states that "Any member of our church who is accused of neglect of the means of grace or other duties required by the Word of God, the indulgence of sinful tempers, words or actions, the sowing of dissension, or any other violation of the order and discipline of the church, may, after proper labor and admonition, be censured, placed on probation, or expelled by the official board of the circuit of which he is a member. If he request a trial, however, within thirty dates of the final action of the official board, it shall be granted."

=== Anabaptist tradition ===
==== Amish ====
Amish communities practice variations of excommunication known as "shunning". This practice may include isolation from community events or the cessation of all communication.

==== Mennonites ====
Mennonite communities use the "ban", separation, and correction of baptized members who fall into sin. Separated members must be avoided or "shunned" until they repent and reform. Shunning must be done in the spirit of moderation and Christian charity; the aim is not to destroy but to reform the person.

==== Hutterites ====
Hutterite communities use a form of excommunication called "the ban" on baptized members who repeatedly fall into sin.

=== Baptists ===
For Baptists, excommunication is used as a last resort by denominations and churches for members who do not want to repent of beliefs or behavior at odds with the confession of faith of the community. The vote of community members, however, can restore a person who has been excluded.

=== The Church of Jesus Christ of Latter-day Saints ===
The Church of Jesus Christ of Latter-day Saints (LDS Church) practices excommunication as a penalty for those who commit serious sins, i.e., actions that significantly impair the name or moral influence of the church or pose a threat to other people. In 2020, the church ceased using the term "excommunication" and instead refers to "withdrawal of membership". According to the church leadership General Handbook, the purposes of withdrawing membership or imposing membership restrictions are, (1) to help protect others; (2) to help a person access the redeeming power of Jesus Christ through repentance; and (3) to protect the integrity of the Church. The origins of LDS disciplinary procedures and excommunications are traced to a revelation Joseph Smith dictated on 9 February 1831, later canonized as Doctrine and Covenants, section 42 and codified in the General Handbook.

The LDS Church also practices the lesser sanctions of private counsel and caution and informal and formal membership restrictions. (Informal membership restrictions were formerly known as "probation"; formal membership restrictions were formerly known as "disfellowshipment".)

Formal membership restrictions are used for serious sins that do not rise to the level of membership withdrawal. Formal membership restriction denies some privileges but does not include a loss of church membership. Once formal membership restrictions are in place, persons may not take the sacrament or enter church temples, nor may they offer public prayers or sermons. Such persons may continue to attend most church functions and are allowed to wear temple garments, pay tithes and offerings, and participate in church classes if their conduct is orderly. Formal membership restrictions typically lasts for one year, after which one may be reinstated as a member in good standing.

In the more grievous or recalcitrant cases, withdrawal of membership becomes a disciplinary option. Such an action is generally reserved for what are seen as the most serious sins, including committing serious crimes such as murder, child abuse, and incest; committing adultery; involvement in or teaching of polygamy; involvement in homosexual conduct; apostasy; participation in an abortion; teaching false doctrine; or openly criticizing church leaders. The General Handbook states that formally joining another church constitutes apostasy and is worthy of membership withdrawal; however, merely attending another church does not constitute apostasy.

A withdrawal of membership can occur only after a formal church membership council. Formerly called a "disciplinary council" or a "church court", the councils were renamed to avoid focusing on guilt and instead to emphasize the availability of repentance.

The decision to withdraw the membership of a Melchizedek priesthood holder is generally the province of the leadership of a stake. In such a disciplinary council, the stake presidency and, sometimes in more difficult cases, the stake high council attend. It is possible to appeal a decision of a stake membership council to the church's First Presidency.

For females and for male members not initiated into the Melchizedek priesthood, a ward membership council is held. In such cases, a bishop determines whether withdrawal of membership or a lesser sanction is warranted. He does this in consultation with his two counselors, with the bishop making the final determination after prayer. The decision of a ward membership council can be appealed to the stake president.

The following list of variables serves as a general set of guidelines for when membership withdrawal or lesser action may be warranted, beginning with those more likely to result in severe sanction:

1. Violation of covenants: Covenants are made in conjunction with specific ordinances in the LDS Church. Violated covenants that might result in excommunication are usually those surrounding marriage covenants, temple covenants, and priesthood covenants.
2. Position of trust or authority: The person's position in the church hierarchy factors into the decision. It is considered more serious when a sin is committed by an area seventy; a stake, mission, or temple president; a bishop; a patriarch; or a full-time missionary.
3. Repetition: Repetition of a sin is more serious than a single instance.
4. Magnitude: How often, how many individuals were impacted, and who is aware of the sin factor into the decision.
5. Age, maturity, and experience: Those who are young in age, or immature in their understanding, are typically afforded leniency.
6. Interests of the innocent: How the discipline will impact innocent family members may be considered.
7. Time between transgression and confession: If the sin was committed in the distant past, and there has not been repetition, leniency may be considered.
8. Voluntary confession: If a person voluntarily confesses the sin, leniency is suggested.
9. Evidence of repentance: Sorrow for sin, and demonstrated commitment to repentance, as well as faith in Jesus Christ, all play a role in determining the severity of discipline.

Notices of withdrawal of membership may be made public, especially in cases of apostasy, where members could be misled. However, the specific reasons for individual withdrawal of membership are typically kept confidential and are seldom made public by church leadership.

Those who have their membership withdrawn lose the right to partake of the sacrament. Such persons are permitted to attend church meetings but participation is limited: they cannot offer public prayers, preach sermons, and cannot enter temples. Such individuals are also prohibited from wearing or purchasing temple garments and from paying tithes. A person whose membership has been withdrawn may be re-baptized after a waiting period of at least one year and sincere repentance, as judged by a series of interviews with church leaders.

Some critics have charged that LDS Church leaders have used the threat of membership withdrawal to silence or punish church members and researchers who disagree with established policy and doctrine, who study or discuss controversial subjects, or who may be involved in disputes with local, stake leaders or general authorities; see, e.g., Brian Evenson, a former BYU professor and writer whose fiction came under criticism from BYU officials and LDS Leadership. Another notable case of excommunication from the LDS Church was the "September Six", a group of intellectuals and professors, five of whom were excommunicated and the sixth disfellowshipped. However, church policy dictates that local leaders are responsible for membership withdrawal, without influence from church headquarters. The church thus argues that this policy is evidence against any systematic persecution of scholars or dissenters. Data shows per-capita excommunication rates among the LDS Church have varied dramatically over the years, from a low of about 1 in 6,400 members in the early 1900s to one in 640 by the 1970s, an increase which has been speculatively attributed to "informal guidance from above" in enforcing the growing list of possible transgressions added to General Handbook editions over time.

=== Jehovah's Witnesses ===
Jehovah's Witnesses practice a form of excommunication, using the term "disfellowshipping", in cases where a member is believed to have unrepentantly committed one or more of several documented "serious sins".

When a member confesses to, or is accused of, a serious sin, a judicial committee of at least three elders is formed. This committee investigates the case and determines the magnitude of the sin committed. If the person is deemed guilty of a disfellowshipping offense, the committee then decides, on the basis of the person's attitude and "works befitting repentance".

Disfellowshipping is a severing of friendly relationships between all Jehovah's Witnesses and the disfellowshipped person. Interaction with extended family is typically restricted to a minimum, such as presence at the reading of wills and providing essential care for the elderly. Within a household, typical family contact may continue, but without spiritual fellowship such as family Bible study and religious discussions. Parents of disfellowshipped minors living in the family home may continue to attempt to convince the child about the group's teachings. Jehovah's Witnesses believe that this form of discipline encourages the disfellowshipped individual to conform to biblical standards and prevents the person from influencing other members of the congregation.

Along with breaches of the Witnesses' moral code, openly disagreeing with the teachings of Jehovah's Witnesses is considered grounds for shunning. These persons are labeled as "apostates" and are described in Watch Tower Society literature as "mentally diseased". Descriptions of "apostates" appearing in the Witnesses literature have been the subject of investigation in the UK to determine if they violate religious hatred laws. Sociologist Andrew Holden claims many Witnesses who would otherwise defect because of disillusionment with the organization and its teachings, remain affiliated out of fear of being shunned and losing contact with friends and family members. Shunning employs what is known as relational aggression in psychological literature. When used by church members and member-spouse parents against excommunicant parents it contains elements of what psychologists call parental alienation. Extreme shunning may cause trauma to the shunned (and to their dependents), similar to what is studied in the psychology of torture.

Disassociation is a form of shunning where a member expresses verbally or in writing that they do not wish to be associated with Jehovah's Witnesses, rather than for having committed any specific 'sin'. Elders may also decide that an individual has disassociated, without any formal statement by the individual, by actions such as accepting a blood transfusion, or for joining another religious or military organization. Individuals who are deemed by the elders to have disassociated are given no right of appeal.

Each year, congregation elders are instructed to consider meeting with disfellowshipped individuals to determine changed circumstances and encourage them to pursue reinstatement. Reinstatement is not automatic after a certain time period, nor is there a minimum duration; disfellowshipped persons may talk to elders at any time but must apply in writing to be considered for reinstatement into the congregation. Elders consider each case individually, and are instructed to ensure "that sufficient time has passed for the disfellowshipped person to prove that his profession of repentance is genuine". A judicial committee meets with the individual to determine their repentance, and if this is established, the person is reinstated into the congregation and may participate with the congregation in their formal ministry (such as house-to-house preaching).

A Witness who has been formally reproved or reinstated cannot be appointed to any special privilege of service for at least one year. Serious sins involving child sex abuse permanently disqualify the sinner from appointment to any congregational privilege of service, regardless of whether the sinner was convicted of any secular crime.

=== Christadelphians ===
Similarly to many groups having their origins in the 1830s Restoration Movement, Christadelphians call their form of excommunication "disfellowshipping", though they do not practice "shunning". Disfellowshipping can occur for moral reasons, changing beliefs, or (in some ecclesias) for not attending communion (referred to as "the emblems" or "the breaking of bread").

In such cases, the person involved is usually required to discuss the issues. If they do not conform, the church ('meeting' or 'ecclesia') is recommended by the management committee ("Arranging Brethren") to vote on disfellowshipping the person. These procedures were formulated 1863 onwards by early Christadelphians, and then in 1883 codified by Robert Roberts in A Guide to the Formation and Conduct of Christadelphian Ecclesias (colloquially "The Ecclesial Guide"). However Christadelphians justify and apply their practice not only from this document but also from passages such as the exclusion in 1Co.5 and recovery in 2Co.2.

Christadelphians typically avoid the term "excommunication" which many associate with the Catholic Church; and may feel the word carries implications they do not agree with, such as undue condemnation and punishment, as well as failing to recognise the remedial intention of the measure.

- Behavioural cases. Many cases regarding moral issues tend to involve relational matters such as marriage outside the faith, divorce and remarriage (which is considered adultery in some circumstances by some ecclesias), or homosexuality. Reinstatement for moral issues is determined by the ecclesia's assessment of whether the individual has "turned away" from (ceased) the course of action considered immoral by the church. This can be complex when dealing with cases of divorce and subsequent remarriage, with different positions adopted by different ecclesias, but generally within the main "Central" grouping, such cases can be accommodated.
- Doctrinal cases. Changes of belief on what Christadelphians call "first principle" doctrines are difficult to accommodate unless the individual agrees to not teach or spread them, since the body has a documented Statement of Faith which informally serves as a basis of ecclesial membership and interecclesial fellowship. Those who are disfellowshipped for reasons of differing belief rarely return, because they are expected to conform to an understanding with which they do not agree. Holding differing beliefs on fundamental matters is considered as error and apostasy, which can limit a person's salvation. However, in practice disfellowship for doctrinal reasons is now unusual.

In the case of adultery and divorce, the passage of time usually means a member can be restored if he or she wants to be. In the case of ongoing behaviour, cohabitation, homosexual activity, then the terms of the suspension have not been met.

The mechanics of "refellowship" follow the reverse of the original process; the individual makes an application to the "ecclesia", and the "Arranging Brethren" give a recommendation to the members who vote. If the "Arranging Brethren" judge that a vote may divide the ecclesia, or personally upset some members, they may seek to find a third party ecclesia which is willing to "refellowship" the member instead. According to the Ecclesial Guide a third party ecclesia may also take the initiative to "refellowship" another meeting's member. However this cannot be done unilaterally, as this would constitute heteronomy over the autonomy of the original ecclesia's members.

=== Society of Friends (Quakers) ===
Among many of the Society of Friends (Quakers) groups one is read out of meeting for behaviour inconsistent with the sense of the meeting. In Britain a meeting may record a minute of disunity. However, it is the responsibility of each meeting, quarterly meeting, and yearly meeting to act with respect to their own members. For example, during the Vietnam War, many Friends were concerned about Friend Richard Nixon's position on war, which seemed at odds with their beliefs; however, it was the responsibility of Nixon's own meeting, the East Whittier Meeting of Whittier, California, to act if indeed that meeting felt the leading. They did not.

In 17th- and 18th-Century North America, before the founding of abolitionist societies, Friends who too forcefully tried to convince their coreligionists of the evils of slavery were read out of meeting. Benjamin Lay was read out of the Philadelphia Yearly Meeting for this. During the American Revolution over 400 Friends were read out of meeting for their military participation or support.

=== Iglesia ni Cristo ===
Iglesia ni Cristo practices expulsion of members it deems to have gravely sinned or gone against the teachings and doctrines of the church. The Sanggunian, the church's council, has jurisdiction to expel members from the church. People expelled by the church are referred to as dismissed (Tagalog: tiwalag). Offenses that may be grounds for expulsion include marrying a non-member, having a romantic relationship with a non-member, becoming pregnant out of wedlock (unless the couple marries before the child is born), and most especially disagreeing with the church administration. An expelled member can be re-admitted by pledging obedience to the church administration and its rules, values and teachings.

== Unitarian Universalism ==
Unitarian Universalism, being a liberal religious group and a congregational denomination, has a wide diversity of opinions and sentiments. Nonetheless, Unitarian Universalists have had to deal with disruptive individuals. Congregations which had no policies on disruptive individuals have sometimes found themselves having to create such policies, up to (and including) expulsion.

By the late 1990s, several churches were using the West Shore UU Church's policy as a model. If someone is threatening, disruptive, or distracting from the appeal of the church to its membership, a church using this model has three recommended levels of response to the offending individual. While the first level involves dialogue between a committee or clergy member and the offender, the second and third levels involve expulsion, either from the church itself or a church activity.

== Buddhism ==
There is no direct equivalent to excommunication in Buddhism. However, in the Theravadan monastic community, monks can be expelled from monasteries for heresy or other acts. In addition, monks have four vows, called the four pārājikas, or "defeats", which are: abstaining from sexual intercourse, stealing, murder, and lying about spiritual gains (e.g., having special power or ability to perform miracles). If any one of these prohibitions is broken, the monk is automatically rendered a layperson again and can never become a monk in his or her current life.

Most Japanese Buddhist sects hold ecclesiastical authority over their followers and have their own rules for expelling members of the sangha, lay or bishopric. For example, the lay Japanese Buddhist organization Sōka Gakkai was expelled from the Nichiren Shoshu sect in 1991.

== Hinduism ==
Hinduism is too diverse to be seen as a homogenous and monolithic religion. It is often described an unorganised and syncretist religion with a conspicuous absence of any listed doctrines. There are multiple religious institutions (equivalent to Christian ecclesia) within Hinduism that teach slight variations of Dharma and Karma, hence Hinduism has no concept of excommunication and hence no Hindu may be ousted from the Hindu religion, though a person may easily lose caste status through gramanya for a very wide variety of infringements of caste prohibitions. This may or may not be recoverable. However, some of the modern organised sects within Hinduism may practice something equivalent to excommunication today, by ousting a person from their own sect.

In medieval and early-modern times (and sometimes even now) in South Asia, excommunication from one's caste (jāti or varna) used to be practiced (by the caste-councils) and was often with serious consequences, such as abasement of the person's caste status and even throwing him into the sphere of the untouchables or bhangi. In the 19th century, a Hindu faced excommunication for going abroad, since it was presumed he/she would be forced to break caste restrictions and, as a result, become polluted.

After excommunication, it would depend upon the caste-council whether they would accept any form of repentance (ritual or otherwise) or not. Such current examples of excommunication in Hinduism are often more political or social rather than religious, for example the excommunication of lower castes for refusing to work as scavengers in Tamil Nadu.

Another example of caste-related violence and discrimination occurred in the case of the Gupti Ismailis from the Hindu Kachhiya caste. Interestingly, Hindu members of this caste began prayers with the inclusion of the mantra "OM, by the command, in the name of Allah, the Compassionate, the Merciful" (om farmānjī bi’smi’l-lāh al-raḥmān al-raḥīm), but never found it objectionable or Islamic. However, in the early 1930s, after some conflict with caste members due to their profession of allegiance to the Ismaili Imam, this group, known as the Guptis, was excommunicated from the caste completely as they appeared to be breaking caste solidarity. This was also significant for the Gupti community as, for the first time, they could be identified as a distinct group based on their religious persuasion. Some of the more daring Guptis also abandoned their former practice of pious circumspection (taqiyya) as Hindus, claiming that since they had been excommunicated, the caste no longer had any jurisdiction over their actions.

An earlier example of excommunication in Hinduism is that of Shastri Yagnapurushdas, who voluntarily left and was later expelled from the Vadtal Gadi of the Swaminarayan Sampraday by the then Vadtal acharya in 1906. He went on to form his own institution, Bochasanwasi Swaminarayan Sanstha or BSS (now BAPS) claiming Gunatitanand Swami was the rightful spiritual successor to Swaminarayan.

== Sikhism ==
Patit is a Sikh term which is sometimes translated into English as apostate. It refers to a person who initiated into Sikh religion, but violated the religious rules of Sikhi. The Sikh Rehat Maryada (Code of Conduct), Section Six states the transgressions which cause a person to become a patit:

- Dishonouring the hair;
- Eating the meat of an animal slaughtered the Kutha way;
- Cohabiting with a person other than one's spouse;
- Using an intoxicant (such as smoking, drinking alcohol, using recreational drugs or tobacco)

These four kurahit causes of apostasy were first listed by Guru Gobind Singh in his 52 hukams (commandments).

== Islam ==
Since there has been no universally and univocally recognized religious authority among the many Islamic denominations that have emerged throughout history, papal excommunication has no exact equivalent in Islam, at least insofar as the attitudes of any conflicting religious authorities with regard to an individual or another sect are judged to be coordinate, not subordinate to one another. Nonetheless, condemning heterodoxy and punishing heretics through shunning and ostracism is comparable with the practice in non-Catholic Christian faiths.

Islamic theologians commonly employ two terms when describing measurements to be taken against schismatics and heresy: هَجْر (hajr, "abandoning") and تَكْفِير (takfīr, "making or declaring to be a nonbeliever"). The former (هَجْر, hajr) signifies the act of abandoning somewhere (such as migration, as in the Islamic prophet's journey out of Mecca, which is called al-Hijra ("the (e)migration")) or someone (used in the Qur'an in the case of disciplining a dissonant or disobedient wife or avoiding a harmful person). The latter (تَكْفِير, takfīr) means a definitive declaration that denounces a person as a kāfir ("infidel"). However, because such a charge would entail serious consequences for the accused, who would then be deemed to be a مُرْتَدّ (murtadd, "a backslider; an apostate), less extreme denunciations, such as an accusation of بِدْعَة (bidʽah, "[deviant] innovation; heresy") followed by shunning and excommunication have historically preponderated over apostasy trials.

Takfīr has often been practiced through the courts. More recently, cases have taken place where individuals have been considered nonbelievers. These decisions followed lawsuits against individuals, mainly in response to their writings that some have viewed as anti-Islamic. The most famous cases are of Salman Rushdie, Nasr Abu Zayd, Nawal El-Saadawi, and of the Ahmadiyya Muslim Community. The repercussions of such cases have included divorce, since under traditional interpretations of Islamic law, Muslim women are not permitted to marry non-Muslim men.

== Judaism ==
Herem is the highest ecclesiastical censure in Judaism. It is the total exclusion of a person from the Jewish community. Except for cases in the Charedi community, cherem stopped existing after The Enlightenment, when local Jewish communities lost their political autonomy, and Jews were integrated into the gentile nations in which they lived. A siruv order, equivalent to a contempt of court, issued by a Rabbinical court may also limit religious participation.

Rabbinical conferences of movements do expel members from time to time, but sometimes choose the lesser penalty of censuring the offending rabbi. Between 2010 and 2015, the Reform Jewish Central Conference of American Rabbis expelled six rabbis, the Orthodox Jewish Rabbinical Council of America expelled three, and the Conservative Jewish Rabbinical Assembly expelled one, suspended three, and caused one to resign without eligibility for reinstatement. While the CCAR and RCA were relatively shy about their reasons for expelling rabbis, the RA was more open about its reasons for kicking rabbis out. Reasons for expulsion from the three conferences include sexual misconduct, failure to comply with ethics investigations, setting up conversion groups without the conference's approval, stealing money from congregations, other financial misconduct, and getting arrested.

Judaism, like Unitarian Universalism, tends towards congregationalism, and so decisions to exclude from a community of worship often depend on the congregation. Congregational bylaws sometimes enable the board of a synagogue to ask individuals to leave or not to enter.

== See also ==
- Banishment in the Bible
- Disconnection
- Excommunication of actors by the Catholic Church
- Interdict
- List of people excommunicated by the Catholic Church
- Cancel culture
