= Hagar Offering Water to Her Son Ishmael in the Desert =

Painting by Charles Lock Eastlake

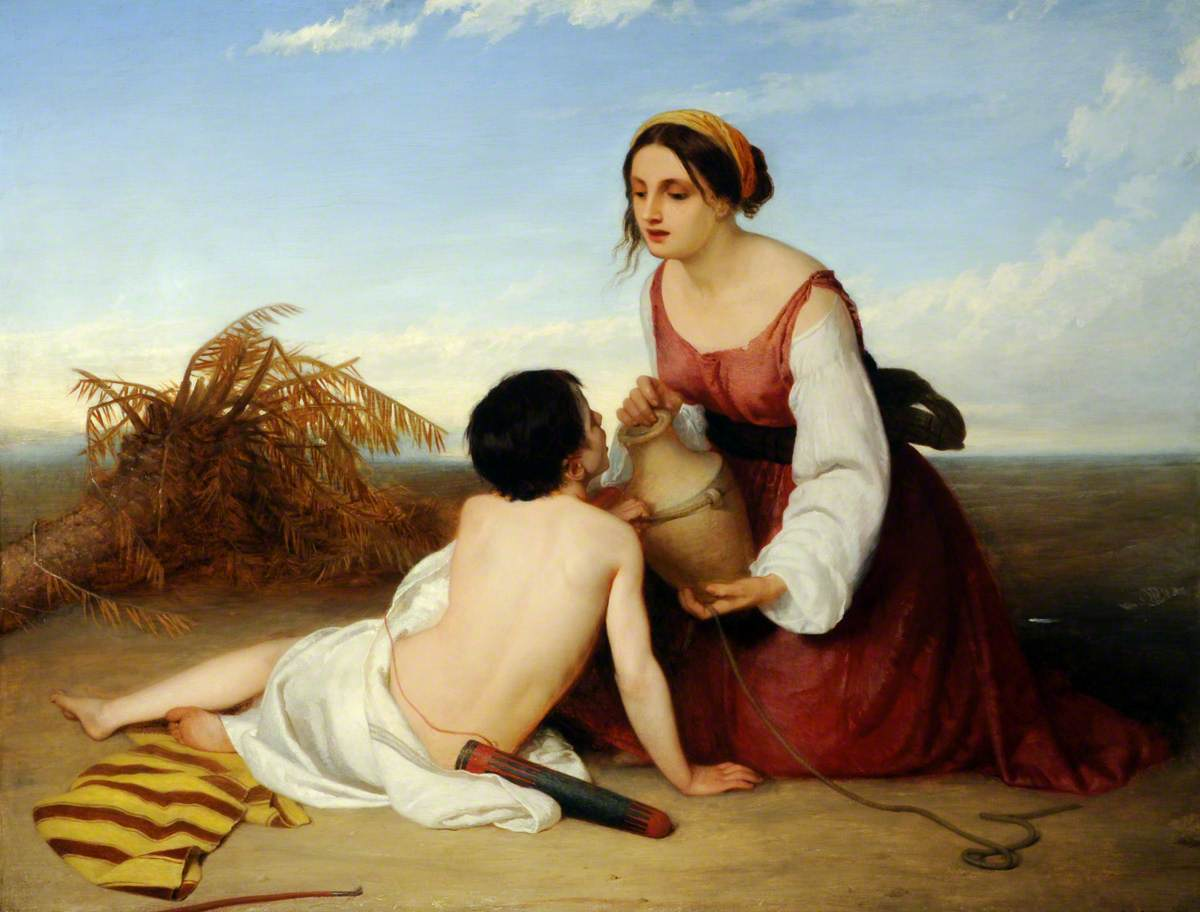
- Artist: Charles Lock Eastlake
- Year: 1842
- Type: Oil on canvas, religious painting
- Dimensions: 71.1 cm × 94 cm (28.0 in × 37 in)
- Location: Borrowdale, Cumbria

Hagar Offering Water to Her Son Ishmael in the Desert is an 1842 religious history painting by the British artist Charles Lock Eastlake. It depicts the Old Testament story of the banishment of Hagar and her son Ishmael. Eastlake had previously produced a work inspired by the story Hagar and Ishmael. The comparison between the two demonstrates the way his style of painting had evolved. He had produced an English translation of Johann Wolfgang von Goethe Theory of Colours in 1840.

The painting was displayed at the Royal Academy Exhibition of 1843 held at the National Gallery in London. Today it is part of the collection at Borrowdale, now in the control of the National Trust. An 1848 print was produced based on the painting by the engraver François Eugène Augustin.

== Bibliography ==
- Giebelhausen, Michaela. Painting the Bible: Representation and Belief in Mid-Victorian Britain. Taylor & Francis, 2017.
- Monkhouse, Cosmo. Pictures by Sir Charles Eastlake. Virtue, Spalding, 1876.
