= Turmel =

Turmel is a surname. Notable people with the surname include:

- John Turmel (born 1951), Canadian politician
- Joseph Turmel (1859-1943), French priest and church historian
- Lucy Turmel (born 1999), English squash player
- Nycole Turmel (born 1942), Canadian politician
