= Siruv =

In Jewish law, a shtar siruv (Hebrew: כתב סירוב; sometimes only siruv or spelled seruv) is a form of contempt of court order issued by a beth din (rabbinical court) in an effort to compel action by an individual.

The siruv has been described as a form of cherem (which combines characteristics of shunning or excommunication) for a party who refuses to appear before a beth din. Under the terms of a siruv, the individual is to be shunned by the community until the terms of the order issued by the beth din are addressed. While most Jewish litigants are adjured from pursuing justice against other Jews in the civil court system, in the case of a siruv, the beth din may permit use of the secular courts by the plaintiff.

In 1993, the Rabbinical Council of America (RCA), one of the world's largest organizations of Orthodox rabbis, issued a resolution regarding spouses who refuse to comply with a beth din in the issuance of a get (the formal divorce document presented by a husband to his wife to terminate their marriage under Jewish law). Synagogues of RCA members were encouraged to formulate procedures under which a spouse under a siruv regarding their failure to comply with issuance of a get would be excluded from membership, employment, elective and appointed positions in the synagogue; would be excluded from being called to the Torah or lead services. Synagogues would announce the non-compliant individual's name monthly after shabbat services and would publish the person's name in its bulletin, including a call to others to "limit their social and economic relations to such persons."
