= Vitandus and toleratus =

Categories of excommunicates in Catholic Church

Vitandus and toleratus are former categories of excommunicates from the Catholic Church, introduced by Pope Martin V in 1418 in his apostolic constitution Ad evitanda scandala.

== Vitandus ==
A vitandus (Latin for "(one) to be avoided"; plural: vitandi) was someone subject to a decree of excommunication which called for Catholics to shun that person.

The three criteria for one to be vitandus were:

1. the decree of excommunication must be publicly announced;
2. the excommunicate's name must be mentioned in the decree;
3. the decree must expressly state the person is to be shunned.

No special method was required for the public announcement; according to the Council of Constance, it sufficed that "the sentence have been published or made known by the judge in a special and express manner". One common method was publication in the Acta Apostolicae Sedis.

Exceptions to the shunning were spouses, parents, children, servants, and subjects, and cases where some reasonable cause existed.

== Toleratus ==
A toleratus (Latin for "tolerated"; plural: tolerati) was any excommunicated person who was not a vitandus. Canon law did not require Catholics in good standing to shun tolerati.

== History ==
The 1917 Code included this distinction. It imposed automatically (latae sententiae) the status of vitandus to anyone who committed physical violence on the Pope himself, and states that with that exception "nobody is a vitandus excommunicate unless the Apostolic See has excommunicated him by name and has proclaimed the excommunication publicly and in the decree has stated expressly that he must be avoided".

In 1908 Alfred Loisy, Ernesto Buonaiuti, Joseph Turmel, and other Modernists were declared vitandi. In 1930, there were only five living people who received the status of vitandus. Leonard Feeney's 1953 excommunication included only two out of the three conditions (the decree did not state Feeney was to be considered vitandus); therefore he was not vitandus.

This distinction between vitandus and toleratus "was still found in canon law as late as the early 20th century, but it has been dropped from current law as being unworkable given the way modern societies are set up".

== Consequences ==
According to the 1917 code (canon 809), public masses could not be held for either vitandi or tolerati. "Private Masses could be applied for tolerated excommunicates (excommunicati tolerati), which included baptized non-Catholics, but for the excommunicates who must be avoided (excommunicati vitandi), a private Mass could be applied only for their conversion (CIC [1917, canon] 2262, §2, 2°). A 'private Mass' excluded any publicizing of the name of the person for whom the Mass was being applied".

Catholic theologian Ludwig Ott considers that those who had been excommunicated as vitandi were not part of the Catholic Church (contrarily to what some like Hermannus Dieckmann and Francisco Suárez state). Ott adds that those excommunicated tolerati "according to the opinion almost generally held today" were still members of the Catholic Church "even after the promulgation of the juridical judgment and even if they are deprived of many spiritual benefits".

== See also ==
- Shunning#In religion
  - Herem (censure)
- Chandala
