= Hagar and Ishmael (painting) =

Painting by Charles Lock Eastlake

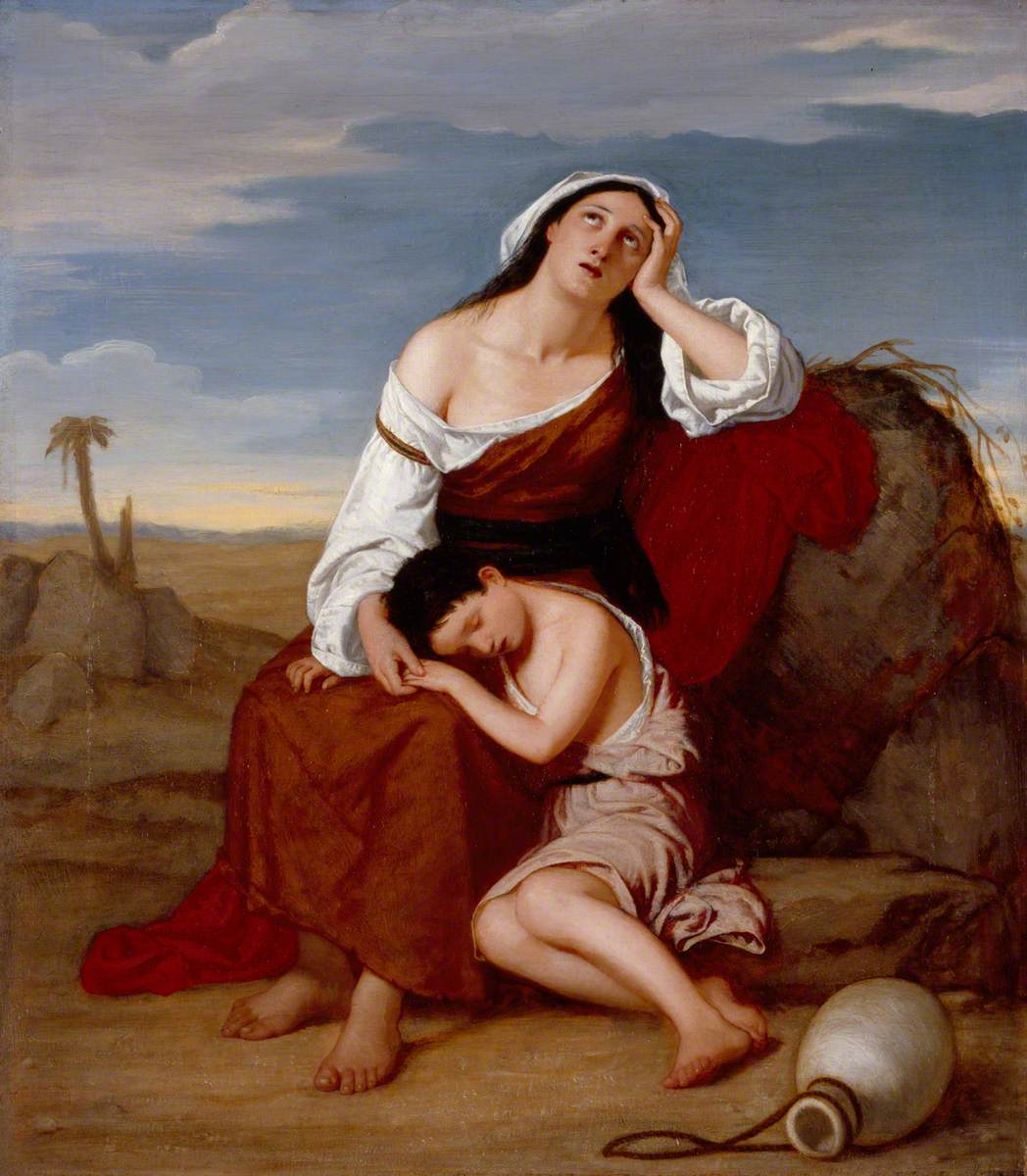
- Artist: Charles Lock Eastlake
- Year: 1830
- Type: Oil on canvas, religious painting
- Dimensions: 58.4 cm × 50.8 cm (23.0 in × 20.0 in)
- Location: Royal Academy of Arts; London

Hagar and Ishmael is an 1830 religious history painting by the British artist Charles Lock Eastlake. It depicts the biblical scene of the banishment of Hagar and her son Ishmael. After the Egyptian Hagar had a child with Abraham, the two were cast out by the patriarch's wife Sarah. It shows the money they are lost in the wildneress of Beersheba completely out of water.

The painting features all the characteristics of the artist's earlier style and reflects the influence of Guido Reni's depictions of saints. It was produced the same year Eastlake returned from Italy where had lived in Rome to London. He presented the painting to the Royal Academy of Arts in 1830 as his diploma work on his admission to full membership. In 1850 he was elected President of the Royal Academy.

In 1842 he returned to the same theme in his painting Hagar Offering Water to Her Son Ishmael in the Desert.

== Bibliography ==
- Giebelhausen, Michaela. Painting the Bible: Representation and Belief in Mid-Victorian Britain. Taylor & Francis, 2017.
- Monkhouse, Cosmo. Pictures by Sir Charles Eastlake. Virtue, Spalding, 1876.
