= Banished =

Banished may refer to:

- The punishment of being exiled
- Banished (film), a 2007 documentary film
- Banished (TV series), a 2015 drama television series
- Banished (video game), a city-building game by Shining Rock Software
- Banished (Halo), an alien faction in the Halo series

== See also ==
- Banish (disambiguation)
