= Kasepekang =

Kasepekang is a punishment under Balinese customary law. The persons (or entire families) subject to it are shunned by their local community.

It is the most severe sentence imposed by traditional authorities such as village councils, which also impose lesser sanctions such as fines or public shaming. According to a 2010 New York Times report describing the increasing importance of customary law in Indonesia since 1998, "in a society where the entire cycle of life and religion is tied to ancestral villages, kasepekang is likened to a social and spiritual death sentence."

== See also ==
- Balinese people
- Ostracism
