= Herem (censure) =

Highest ecclesiastical censure in the Jewish community

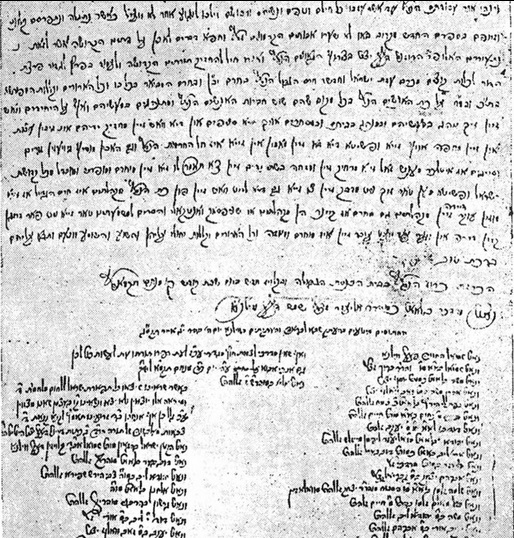
Herem placed on the Hasidim by the Vilna Gaon in 1781

Herem (Hebrew: חֵרֶם ḥērem) is the highest ecclesiastical censure in the Jewish community. It is the total exclusion of a person from the Jewish community. It is a form of shunning and is similar to vitandus "excommunication" in the Catholic Church. Cognate terms in other Semitic languages include the Arabic terms ḥarām "forbidden, taboo, off-limits, or immoral" and haram "set apart, sanctuary", and the Geʽez word ʿirm "accursed".

== Summary ==
Although developed from the biblical ban, excommunication, as employed by the rabbis during Talmudic times and during the Middle Ages, became a rabbinic institution, the object of which was to preserve Jewish solidarity. A system of laws was gradually developed by rabbis, by means of which this power was limited, so that it became one of the modes of legal punishment by rabbinic courts. While it did not entirely lose its arbitrary character, since individuals were allowed to pronounce the ban of excommunication on particular occasions, it became chiefly a legal measure resorted to by a judicial court for certain prescribed offenses.

== Etymology and cognate terms ==
The three terms herem, "censure, excommunication", "devotion of enemies by annihilation" in the Tanakh, and "devotion of property to a kohen", are all English transliterations of the same Hebrew noun. This noun comes from the semitic root Ḥ-R-M. There is also a homonym herem "fisherman's net", which appears nine times in the Masoretic Text of the Tanakh, that has no etymological connection to herem.

The Talmudic usage of herem for excommunication can be distinguished from the usage of herem described in the Tanakh in the time of Joshua and the early Hebrew monarchy, which was the practice of consecration by total annihilation at the command of God carried out against peoples such as the Midianites, the Amalekites, and the entire population of Jericho. The neglect of Saul to carry out such a command as delivered by Samuel resulted in the selection of David as his replacement.

== Offenses ==
The Talmud speaks of twenty-four offenses that, in theory, were punishable by a form of niddui or temporary excommunication. Maimonides (as well as later authorities) enumerates the twenty-four as follows:

1. insulting a learned man, even after his death;
2. insulting a messenger of the court;
3. calling a fellow Jew a "slave";
4. refusing to appear before the court at the appointed time;
5. dealing lightly with any of the rabbinic or Mosaic precepts;
6. refusing to abide by a decision of the court;
7. keeping in one's possession an animal or an object that may prove injurious to others, such as a savage dog or a broken ladder;
8. selling one's real estate to a non-Jew without assuming the responsibility for any injury that the non-Jew may cause his neighbors;
9. testifying against one's Jewish neighbor in a non-Jewish court, and thereby causing that neighbor to lose money which he would not have lost had the case been decided in a Jewish court;
10. a kohen shochet (butcher) who refuses to give the foreleg, cheeks and maw of kosher-slaughtered livestock to another kohen;
11. violating the second day of a holiday, even though its observance is only a custom;
12. performing work on the afternoon of the day preceding Passover;
13. taking the name of God in vain;
14. causing others to profane the name of God;
15. causing others to eat holy meat outside of Jerusalem;
16. making calculations for the calendar, and establishing festivals accordingly, outside of Israel;
17. putting a stumbling-block in the way of the blind, that is to say, tempting another to sin (Lifnei iver);
18. preventing the community from performing some religious act;
19. selling forbidden ("terefah") meat as permitted meat ("kosher");
20. failure by a shochet to show his knife to the rabbi for examination;
21. purposely bringing oneself to erection;
22. engaging in business with one's divorced wife that will lead them to come into contact with each other;
23. being made the subject of scandal (in the case of a rabbi);
24. declaring an unjustified excommunication.

== Nidduy ==
The nidduy (Hebrew: נידוי) ban was usually imposed for a period of seven days (in the Holy Land, thirty days). If inflicted on account of money matters, the offender was first publicly warned (hatra'ah) three times, on Monday, Thursday, and Monday successively, at the regular service in the synagogue. During the period of nidduy, no one except the members of his immediate household was permitted to associate with the offender, sit within four cubits of him, or eat in his company. He was expected to go into mourning and to refrain from bathing, cutting his hair, and wearing shoes, and he had to observe all the laws that pertained to a mourner. He could not be counted in the minyan. If he died, a stone was placed on his hearse, and the relatives were not obliged to observe traditional Jewish mourning ceremonies.

It was within the bet din's power to lessen or increase the severity of the nidduy. The court might even reduce or increase the number of days, forbid all interaction with the offender, and exclude his children from schools and his wife from the synagogue until he became humbled and willing to repent and obey the court's mandates. According to one opinion recorded in the name of Alexander Suslin, the possibility that the offender might leave the Jewish people due to the severity of the nidduy did not prevent the court from adding rigor to its punishments so as to maintain its dignity and authority. This opinion is vehemently contested by the David HaLevi Segal who cites earlier authorities of the same opinion (Solomon Luria; Meir of Rothenburg; Judah Minz) and presents proof of his position from the Talmud. Additionally, the Taz notes that his edition of the Sefer Agudah does not contain the cited position.

== Herem ==
If the offense was in reference to monetary matters, or if the punishment was inflicted by an individual, the laws were more lenient, the chief punishment being that men might not associate with the offender. At the expiration of the period the ban was lifted by the court. If, however, the excommunicate showed no sign of penitence or remorse, the niddui might be renewed once and again, and finally the "herem," the most rigorous form of excommunication, might be pronounced. This extended for an indefinite period, and no one was permitted to teach the offender or work for him, or benefit him in any way, except when he was in need of the bare necessities of life.

== Nezifa ==
A milder form than either nidduy or ḥerem was the nezifa (Hebrew: נְזִיפָה, romanized: nəzifā, lit. 'rebuke'. This ban generally only lasted one day. During this time, the offender dared not appear before him whom he had displeased. He had to retire to his house, speak little, refrain from business and pleasure, and manifest his regret and remorse. He was not required to separate himself from society, nor was he obliged to apologize to the man whom he had insulted; for his conduct on the day of nezifa was sufficient apology. But when a scholar or prominent man actually pronounced a nidduy on one who had slighted him, all the laws of nidduy applied. This procedure was discouraged by the Chazal. It was a matter of pride for a rabbi to be able to say that he had never pronounced the ban of excommunication. Maimonides concludes the chapter on the laws of excommunication:

Although the power is given to the scholar to excommunicate a man who has slighted him, it is not praiseworthy for him to employ this means too frequently. He should rather shut his ears to the words of the ignorant and pay no attention to them, as Solomon, in his wisdom, said, 'Also take no heed unto all words that are spoken' (Eccl 7:21). This was the custom of the early pious men, who would not answer when they heard themselves insulted, but would forgive the insolent … But this humility should be practised only when the insult occurs in private; when the scholar is publicly insulted, he dares not forgive; and if he forgive he should be punished, for then it is an insult to the Torah that he must revenge until the offender humbly apologizes.

== Cases ==
Arguably the most famous case of a herem is that of Baruch Spinoza, the seventeenth-century philosopher.

Another renowned case is the herem the Vilna Gaon ruled against the early Hasidic movement in 1777 and then again in 1781, under the charge of believing in panentheism.

Except in rare cases in Haredi communities, herem stopped existing after the Haskalah, when local Jewish communities lost their political autonomy, and Jews were integrated into the gentile nations in which they lived.

- In August 1918, while Ukraine was ruled by Pavlo Skoropadskyi's Second Hetmanate while under Imperial German Army occupation, the Orthodox Jewish rabbis of Odessa pronounced the herem against Leon Trotsky, Grigory Zinoviev, and other Jewish Bolsheviks.
- In 1945, rabbi Mordecai Kaplan, the founder of Reconstructionist Judaism (a Jewish religious movement that seeks to divorce Judaism from belief in a personal deity), was formally excommunicated by the Haredi Union of Orthodox Rabbis (Agudath HaRabonim).
- In 2004, the High Court of South Africa upheld a herem against a Johannesburg businessman because he refused to pay his former wife alimony as ordered by a beth din.
- A herem against members of Neturei Karta who attended the International Conference to Review the Global Vision of the Holocaust was declared by numerous Haredi religious leaders, including the leaders of the Satmar and Chabad Hasidic groups.

== See also ==
- Anathema
- Banishment in the Torah
- Excommunication
- Exile
- Heresy
- Heresy in Judaism
- Kareth
- Ostracism
- Pulsa diNura
- Siruv
- Taboo
