= Joseph Turmel =

French priest and church historian

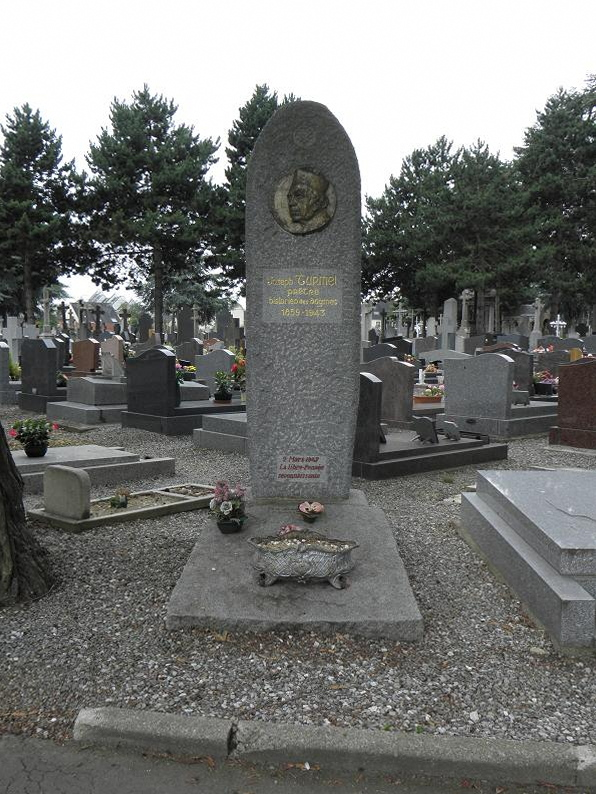
Joseph Turmel's tombstone

Joseph Turmel (13 December 1859 Rennes (Ille-et-Vilaine) – February 1943) was a French Catholic priest, historian of Christian dogmas, who was excommunicated.

== Biography ==
Joseph Turmel was born on 13 December 1859, in Rennes, 142, rue de Saint-Malo. He studied at the seminaries of Rennes and Angers.

=== Studies and priestly activity ===
From 1876 to 1880, he studied philosophy and theology at the Major Seminary of the Archdiocese of Rennes, and he continued until 1882 his studies at the Faculty of Theology of University of Angers.

=== Modernism and excommunication ===
He was excommunicated for Modernism as a vitandus.

He is sometimes referred to as patristician.

== Works ==
Under his name

- Histoire de l'angéologie, des temps apostoliques à la fin du v^{e} siècle, Revue d'histoire et de littérature religieuses, 3, 1898.
- Histoire du dogme du péché originel, Macon, Protat, 1904.
- Tertullien, Bloud, 1905
- Histoire de la théologie positive, du Concile de Trente au Concile du Vatican, Paris, Beauchesne, 1906.
  - vol. I
  - vol. II
- Histoire du dogme de la papauté, des origines jusqu'à la fin du IVe siècle, Paris, Picard, 1908.
- Histoire du diable, Paris, Rieder, 1931.
- Histoire des dogmes, Rieder, 1931–1937, 6 vol., 3151 p.
  - vol. I : Le péché originel. La rédemption, 1931, 464 p.
  - vol. II : La Trinité. L'Incarnation. La Vierge Marie, 1932, 529 p.
  - vol. III : La papauté, 1933, 498 p.
  - vol. IV : Le créationisme, les anges. La vie d'outre-tombe. Canon et inspiration des Écritures. La grâce sanctifiante, 1935, 485 p.
  - vol. V : La grâce actuelle, les sacrements en général, le baptême, la confirmation, l'eucharistie, le mariage, 569 p.
  - vol. VI : La pénitence, la confession, l'extrême-onction. L'ordre. Conclusion, 1937, 547 p.
- Comment j'ai donné congé aux dogmes, Éd. de L'Idée libre, Bibliothèque du libre penseur, Herblay, 1935. Reissue under the title En Soutane. Mémoires, Éd. des Malassis, 2016.
- La Bible expliquée, Herblay, Éd. de L'Idée libre, 1936.
- Réfutation du catéchisme, Herblay, Idée libre, 1937.
- Comment l'Église romaine m'a donné congé, Herblay, 1937. Reissue under the title En Soutane. Mémoires, Ed. des Malassis, 2016.
- Les Religions, Herblay, Idée libre, 1938.
- Le suaire de Turin, suivi d'un « Courte histoire du faux suaire de Cadouin », Éd. de l’Idée libre, Bibliothèque du libre penseur, Herblay, 1938.
- Dieu, Herblay, Éd. de L'Idée libre, Bibliothèque du libre penseur, 1940.

Works under pseudonyms:

- Antoine Dupin, Le dogme de la Trinité dans les trois premiers siècles, Paris, 1907.
- Guillaume Herzog, La Sainte Vierge dans l'histoire. Paris, Nourry, 1908.
- Henri Delafosse, Le quatrième Évangile, Rieder, 1925
- Henri Delafosse, Les écrits de saint Paul, Paris, Rieder, 1926–1928, 4 vol.
  - vol. I : L'épître aux Romains
  - vol. II : La première épître aux Corinthiens
  - vol. III : La seconde épître aux Corinthiens
  - vol. IV : L'épître aux Philippiens
- Louis Coulange, La messe, Rieder, 1927
- Armand Dulac (= Joseph Turmel) and Albert Houtin, Courte histoire du célibat ecclésiastique, Rieder, 1929
- Louis Coulange, Catéchisme pour adultes, Rieder, 1929–1930
  - vol. I : Les dogmes
  - vol. II : Les institutions

== Bibliography ==
Articles:

- Baudru, Hervé (30 March 2007). "« Une vie d'hircocerf » : Joseph Turmel (1859–1943)". Annales de Bretagne et des Pays de l'Ouest (in French) (114–1): 185–198. doi:10.4000/abpo.604. ISSN 0399-0826. S2CID 162255768.

Studies :

- Dujardin, Édouard. Grandeur et décadence de la critique. Sa rénovation. Le cas de l'abbé Turmel. Paris, Messein, 1931.
- Sartiaux, Félix. Joseph Turmel, prêtre, historien des dogmes. Paris, Rieder, 1931.
- Rivière, Jean. Le dogme de la Rédemption devant l'histoire, un plaidoyer de M. Turmel, Paris, J. Gabalda & Cie, 1936.
- Actes du colloque Actualité de l’œuvre anticléricale et antireligieuse de l’abbé Joseph Turmel à l’occasion du soixantenaire de sa disparition. éd LA LIBRE PENSEE 35 /association Joseph Turmel.
- Département des manuscrits de la Bibliothèque nationale, documents concernant Joseph Turmel donnés par M^{me} Félix Sartiaux (n. a. fr. 17780-17792). (Signalés dans Bibliothèque de l'école des chartes, 1985, vol. 143, p. 317, consultable en ligne.)
