= Banish (brand) =

American brand of skincare products

- Industry: Skincare
- Founded: 2013
- Founder: Daisy Jing
- Headquarters: United States
- Website: banish.com

Banish is an American brand of skincare products founded by Daisy Jing in 2013. The line of products includes microneedling kits, vitamin C serums, exfoliating masks and other treatments for acne scarring and collagen induction therapy.

== History ==
Prior to founding the company, Banish founder Daisy Jing created a YouTube channel called The Acne Channel, where she uploaded videos about her experiences with acne. Jing initially planned to study Pre-Med at Duke University in order to become a dermatologist, before switching her major. After discovering microneedling and vitamin C treatments, she began creating her own skin products in her kitchen. She founded Banish on September 25, 2013. Banish was on the Inc. 5000 list in 2017. In 2019, Jing discussed the experiences that led to founding Banish in a TEDx talk at Georgia Tech.

== Products ==
Banish sells various bundles, the most popular ones: the Banish Kit 3.0 and Starter Kit that contains a vitamin C serum, vitamin C moisturizer and a spot treatment, Fighter Gel, and an exfoliating mask, the Pumpkin Enzyme Masque. Banish also sells a microneedling tool known as the Banisher 3.0. The Banisher 3.0 uses gold-plated titanium bristles for microneedling and has replaceable heads of different lengths, 0.25mm, 0.5mm and 1mm. Diversity of needle lengths provides an extensive use of microneedling for the face, neck and body. There is also a Banish "Fighter Gel" made from green tea extract and aloe.
