= Albert Houtin =

Albert Houtin (4 October 1867 – 28 July 1926) was a French Catholic theologian and historian with a focus on the history of doctrine and on modernism in French religion. Born in La Flèche, he grew up to become a priest and was ordained in 1891. Following the turn of the century, he became disenchanted with religion and came to regard all religious belief systems as fraudulent. In 1907, he had attended the Fourth International Congress of Religious Liberals in Boston, which had been organised by Unitarians.

He died in Paris in 1926, leaving incomplete Courte Histoire du célibat ecclésiastique (Short History of Ecclesiastical Celibacy) in which he argues that the practice of celibacy among priests has been difficult to maintain throughout previous centuries.
