= Shunning =

Act of social rejection, or emotional distance

Shunning can be the act of social rejection, or emotional distance. In a religious context, shunning is a formal decision by a denomination or a congregation to cease interaction with an individual or a group, and follows a particular set of rules. It differs from, but may be associated with, excommunication.

The social rejection occurs when a person or group deliberately avoids association with, and habitually keeps away from an individual or group. This can be a formal decision by a group, or a less formal group action which will spread to all members of the group as a form of solidarity. Shunning can sometimes also be used by an individual to express discontent with an action of their family. Sometimes shunning leads to shunning in itself. An example would be a son using shunning to stop their mother from shunning someone.

Shunning is a sanction against association, often associated with religious groups and other tightly knit organizations and communities. Targets of shunning can include persons who have been labeled as apostates, whistleblowers, dissidents, strikebreakers, or anyone the group perceives as a threat or source of conflict. Shunning can also be the result of the love life of a person. This often results because of marriage/dating outside of their religion/class. In these cases it's most often the direct family of the couple which shun the couple because of discontent with the marriage (interfaith marriages). This can be motivated by fear of the reaction of their community or because of personal beliefs.

Social rejection has been established to cause psychological damage and has been categorized as torture or a low-cost punishment for failed cooperation. Mental rejection is a more individual action, where a person subconsciously or willfully ignores an idea, or a set of information related to a particular viewpoint. Some groups are made up of people who shun the same ideas.

Most shunning incorporates shaming (publicly and/or privately), and often implies disgrace and suppression.

Social rejection was and is a punishment in many customary legal systems or cultures. Such sanctions include the ostracism of ancient Athens and the still-used kasepekang in Balinese society. It happens more often in tight communities when people fear losing their social status.

== In religion ==
=== Christianity ===
==== Anabaptism ====
Certain groups of the Amish and Mennonites—Anabaptist communities—practice shunning (banning) or meidung. Historically, the Schwarzenau Brethren practiced a form of shunning that they called "avoidance," a refusal to eat with even a family member whom the church had placed in "avoidance."

==== Catholicism ====
Prior to the Code of Canon Law of 1983, in rare cases (known as excommunication vitandi) the Catholic Church expected adherents to shun an excommunicated member in secular matters.

In 1983, the distinction between vitandi and others (tolerandi) was abolished, and thus the expectation is not made anymore.

==== Jehovah's Witnesses ====
Jehovah's Witnesses practice a form of shunning. For many years, the practice was referred to as "disfellowshipping"; however, the term was discontinued in 2024, and is instead referred to as "removal from the congregation". A tribunal of elders determines whether an individual has committed a serious sin and is unrepentant. Elders may meet with the individual a number of times to encourage repentance before deciding to remove the person from the congregation.

For many years, members were instructed to not even greet shunned individuals. As of March 2024, members are permitted to invite shunned individuals to congregation meetings or offer brief greetings at meetings, unless the individual is deemed to be an apostate.

Sociologist Andrew Holden's research indicates that many Witnesses who would otherwise defect because of disillusionment with the organization and its teachings retain affiliation out of fear of being shunned and losing contact with friends and family members.

=== Judaism ===
Cherem is the highest ecclesiastical censure in the Jewish community. It is the total exclusion of a person from the Jewish community. It is still used in the Ultra-Orthodox and Hasidic community. In the 21st century, sexual abuse victims and their families who have reported abuse to civil authorities have experienced shunning in the Orthodox communities of New York and Australia. Orthodox Jewish men who refuse to grant their wives a divorce are sometimes subject to shunning or shaming, as a form of social pressure intended to compel the husband to allow his wife to leave the marriage. This pressure can take the form of refusing to allow the husband to perform certain religious rituals in the synagogue, refusing his business in commerce, legal solutions such as restraining orders, and public shaming.

=== Baháʼí faith ===
Members of the Baháʼí Faith are expected to shun those that have been declared Covenant-breakers, and expelled from the religion, by the head of their faith. Covenant-breakers are defined as leaders of schismatic groups that resulted from challenges to legitimacy of Baháʼí leadership, as well as those who follow or refuse to shun them. Unity is considered the highest value in the Baháʼí Faith, and any attempt at schism by a Baháʼí is considered a spiritual sickness, and a negation of that for which the religion stands.

=== Church of Scientology ===
The Church of Scientology asks its members to quit all communication with "suppressive persons" (those whom the Church deems antagonistic to Scientology). The practice of shunning in Scientology is termed disconnection. Members can disconnect from any person they already know, including existing family members. Many examples of this policy's application have been established in court. It used to be customary to write a "disconnection letter" to the person being disconnected from, and to write a public disconnection notice, but these practices have not continued.

The Church states that typically only people with "false data" about Scientology are antagonistic, so it encourages members to first attempt to provide "true data" to these people. According to official Church statements, disconnection is only used as a last resort and only lasts until the antagonism ceases. Failure to disconnect from a suppressive person is itself labelled a suppressive act. In the United States, the Church has tried to argue in court that disconnection is a constitutionally protected religious practice. However, this argument was rejected because the pressure put on individual Scientologists to disconnect means it is not voluntary.

== See also ==
- Al Wala' Wal Bara' – Concept of "loyalty and disavowal" in Islam
- Anathema – Term for something or someone vehemently hated or banned
- Apostasy in Islam – Formal disaffiliation from the Islamic religion
- Cancel culture – Modern form of social rejection
- Criminalization – Process of categorising acts as crimes
- Damnatio memoriae – Exclusion of a person from official records and accounts
- Dima Yakovlev Law – Law defining citizens banned from Russia
- Ghosting (behavior) – Stopping all communication with a person
- Interdict – Type of ban within Catholic canon law
- Magnitsky Act – 2012 United States federal law
- No platform – Denial of a platform to speak
- Passive-aggressive behaviour – Indirect resistance to the demands of others
- Persona non grata – Unwelcome foreign person in a country
- Silent treatment – Refusal to communicate with someone who desires communication
- Social exclusion – Form of social disadvantage and relegation to the fringe of society
