= Banishment in the Torah =

Exiles as referenced in the Bible

Banishment or exile can be a form of punishment. It means to be away from one's home (i.e. city, state or country) while either being explicitly refused permission to return and/or being threatened by prison or death upon return. It is a common theme within the Bible, beginning with Adam and Eve. Below is a partial list of these exiles as referenced in the Bible.

== Genesis ==
=== Genesis Chapter 3 ===
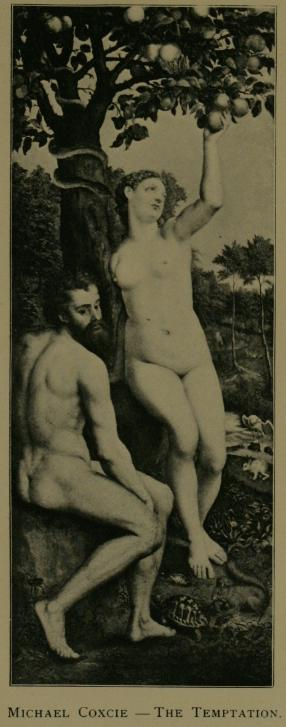

- Genesis 3:23

Therefore, the LORD God sent him forth from the garden of Eden, to till the ground from whence he was taken.

- Genesis 3:24

So He drove out the man; and He placed at the east of the garden of Eden the cherubim, and the flaming sword which turned every way, to keep the way to the tree of life.

(Adam and Eve expelled from the Garden of Eden for eating the forbidden apple.)

=== Genesis Chapter 6 ===
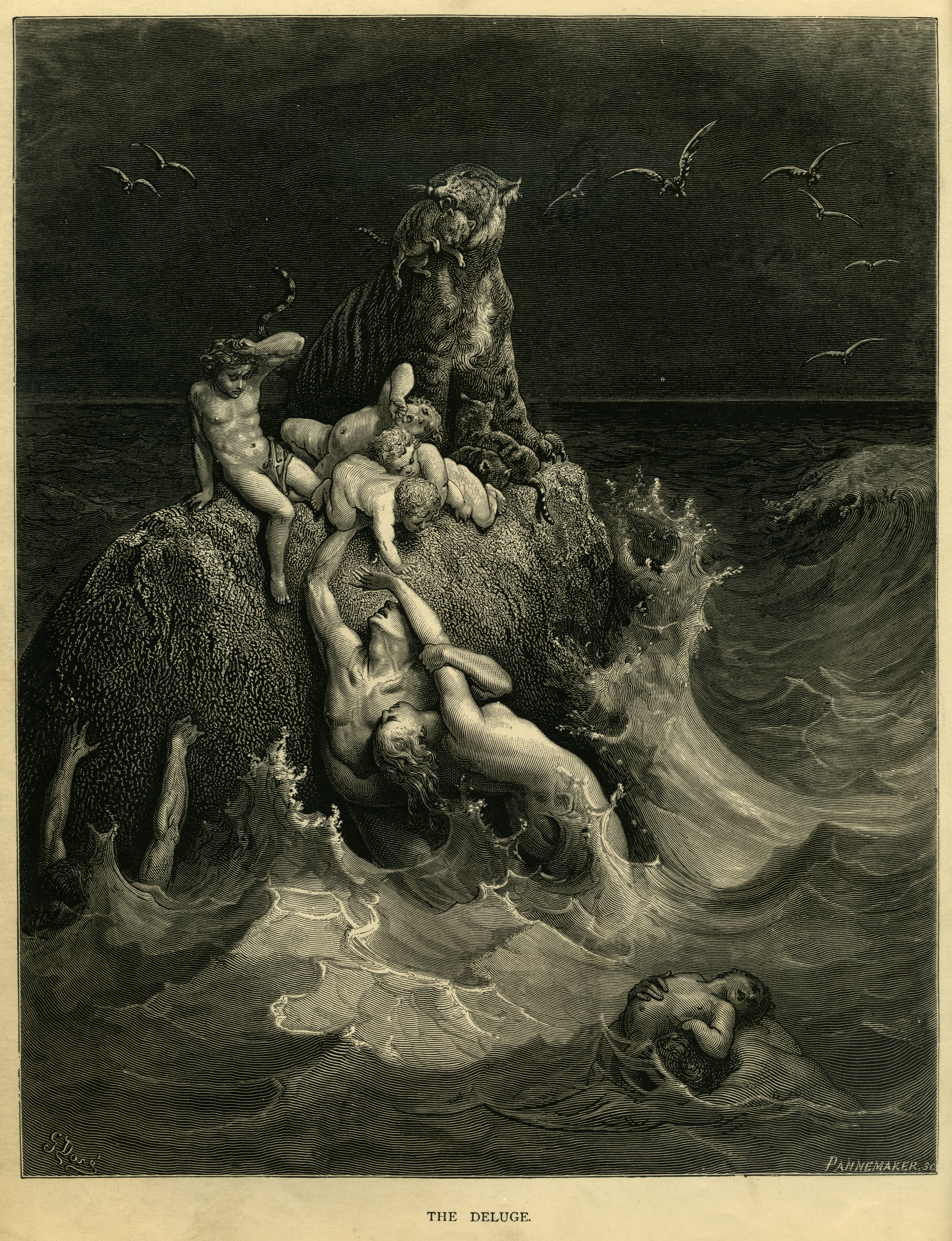
The Deluge by Gustave Doré.

- Genesis 6:7

And the LORD said: 'I will blot out man whom I have created from the face of the earth; both man, and beast, and creeping thing, and fowl of the air; for it repenteth Me that I have made them.'

(The LORD decides to flood the earth due to the evil of men—just before Noah's Flood.)

=== Genesis Chapter 11 ===
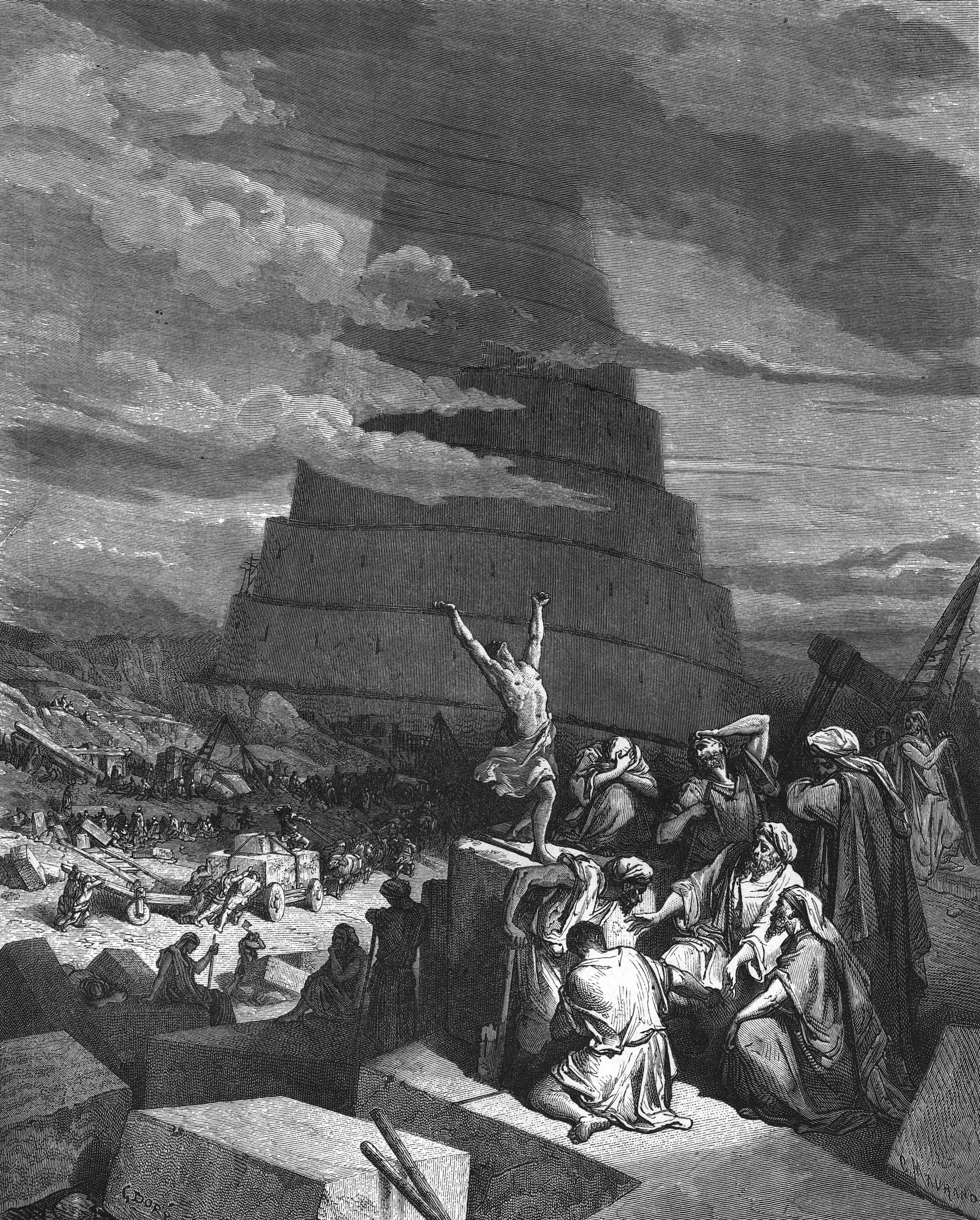
Engraving The Confusion of Tongues by Gustave Doré (1865), who based his conception on the Minaret of Samarra

- Genesis 11:9

Therefore, was the name of it called Babel; because the LORD did there confound the language of all the earth; and from thence did the LORD scatter them abroad upon the face of all the earth.

(No longer able to communicate and resolve conflicts, people scatter themselves after the failed Tower of Babel project.)

=== Genesis Chapter 13 ===
- Genesis 13:9

Is not the whole land before thee? separate thyself, I pray thee, from me; if thou wilt take the left hand, then I will go to the right; or if thou take the right hand, then I will go to the left.'

(Abraham and his brother Lot decide to separate their households to avoid conflicts over land and property.)

The story of Lot is told in the Book of Genesis. Lot is mentioned in chapters 11-14 and 19.

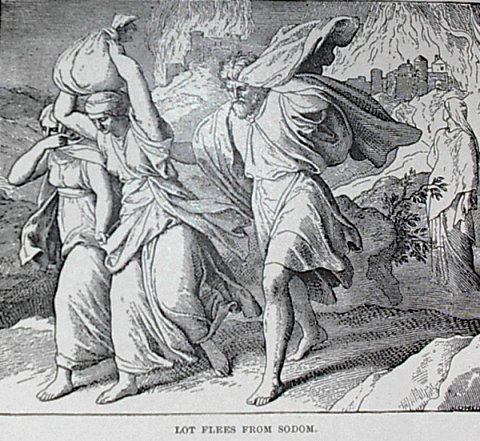

=== Genesis Chapter 16 ===
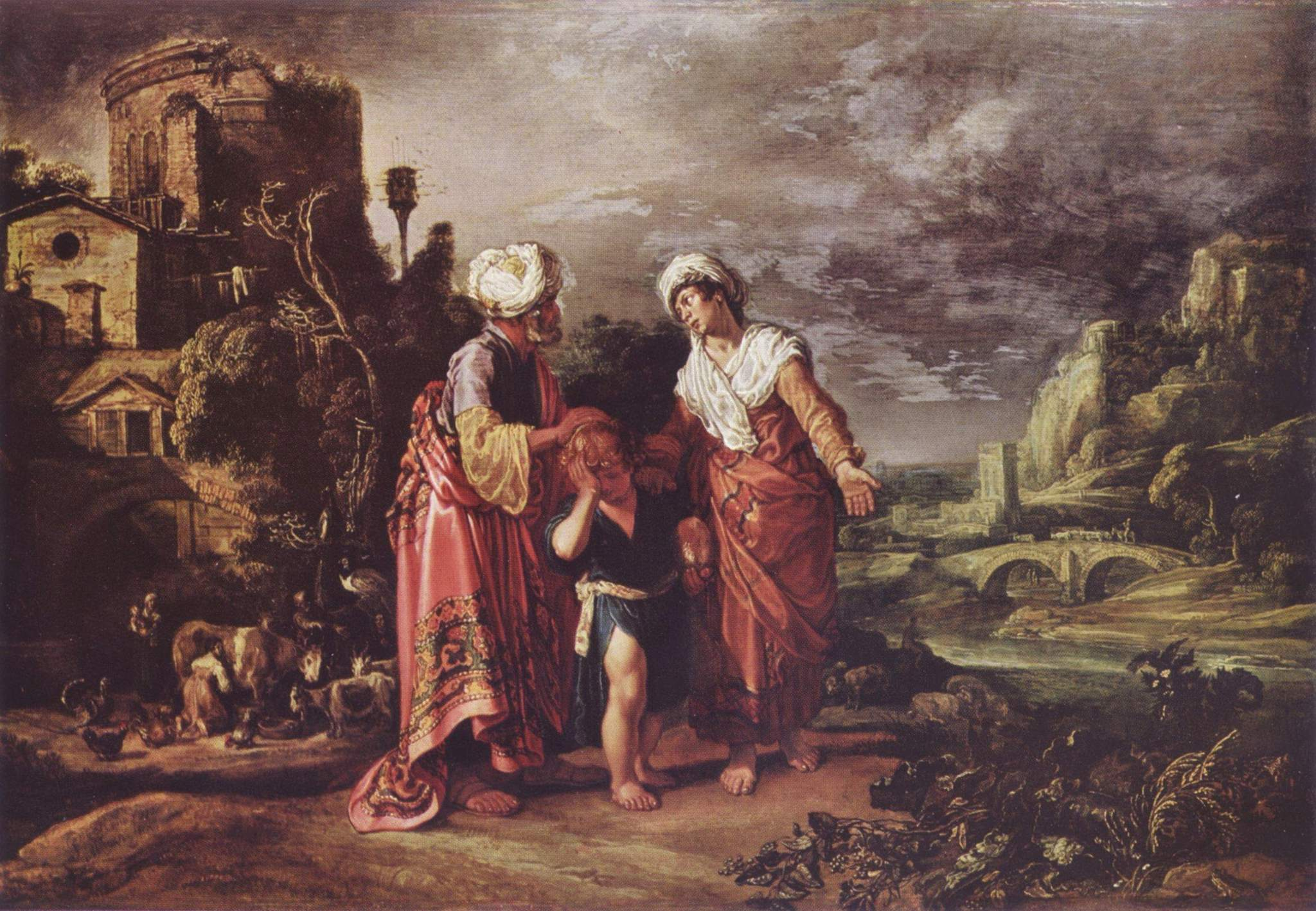
"The dismissal of Hagar", 1612 by Pieter Pietersz Lastman

- Genesis 16:6

But Abram said unto Sarai: 'Behold, thy maid is in thy hand; do to her that which is good in thine eyes.' And Sarai dealt harshly with her, and she fled from her face.

(Sarah deals harshly with her Egyptian maid Hagar, forcing her to run away.)

=== Genesis Chapter 17 ===
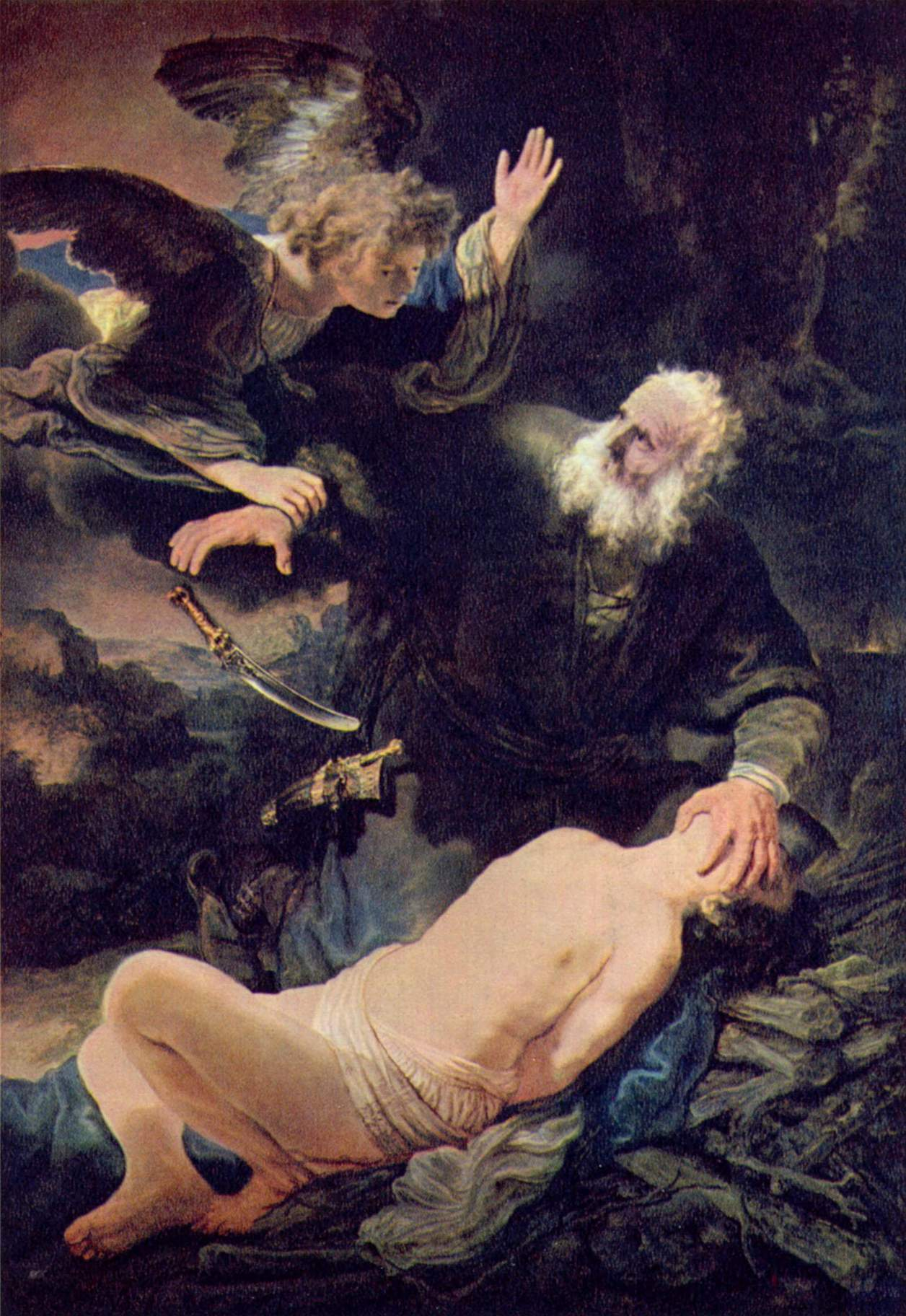
An angel prevents the sacrifice of Isaac. Abraham and Isaac

- Genesis 17:14

And the uncircumcised male who is not circumcised in the flesh of his foreskin, that soul shall be cut off from his people; he hath broken My covenant.'

(The LORD talks to Abraham just before telling him that Sarah will bear Isaac, proclaiming that uncircumcised males shall be "cut off".)

=== Genesis Chapter 21 ===
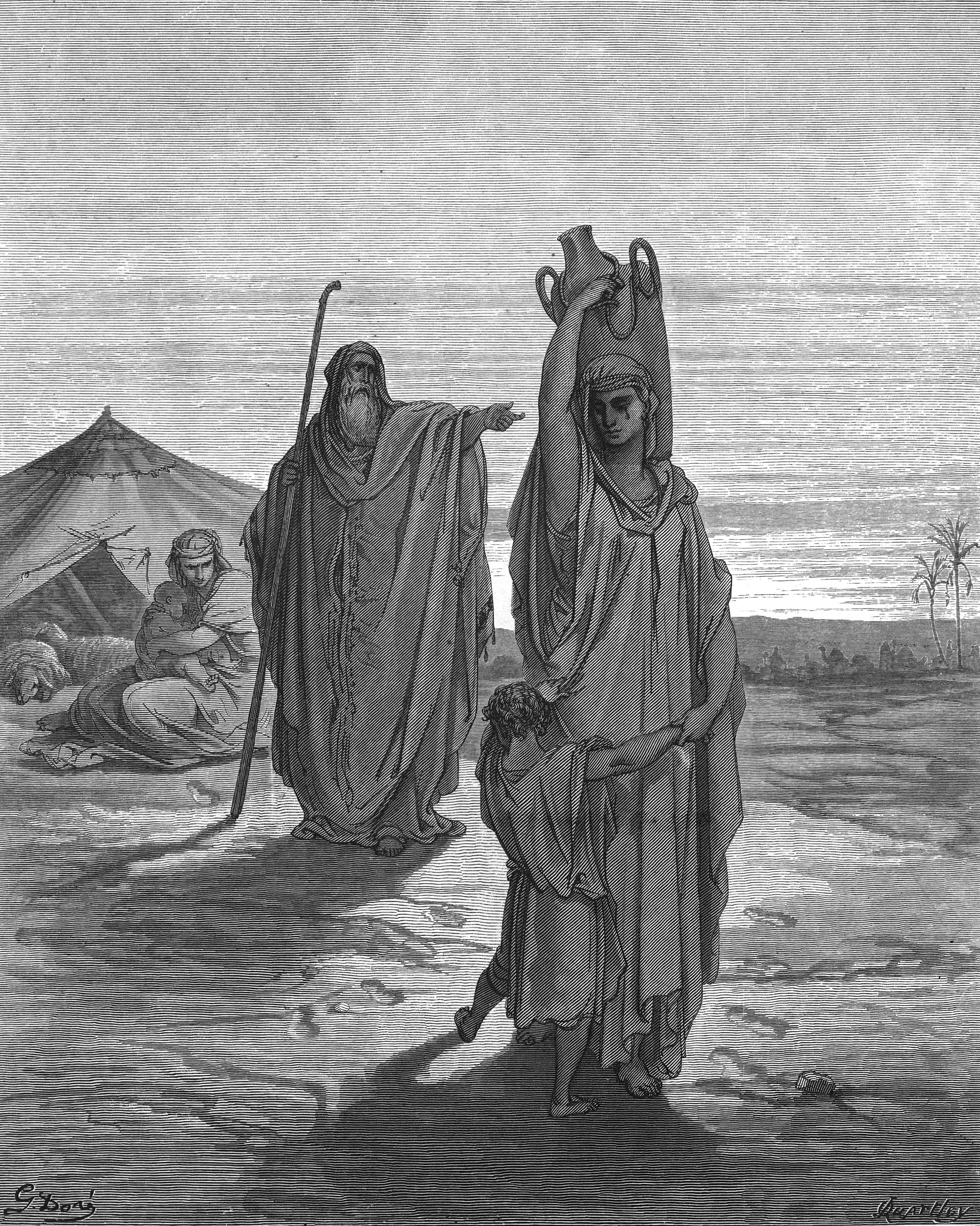
Expulsion of Ishmael and His Mother, from Gustave Doré's illustrated Bible of 1866.

- Genesis 21:14

And Abraham arose up early in the morning, and took bread and a bottle of water, and gave it unto Hagar, putting it on her shoulder, and the child, and sent her away; and she departed, and strayed in the wilderness of Beer-sheba.

(Abraham 'divorces' Hagar after being advised to do so by Sarah, sending her into the desert with only her son Ishmael. Afterwards, the water is depleted, and Hagar sits down to die. An Angel of the LORD then appears and rescues Hagar and Ishmael, and promises to make Ishmael "a great nation".)

=== Genesis Chapter 37 ===
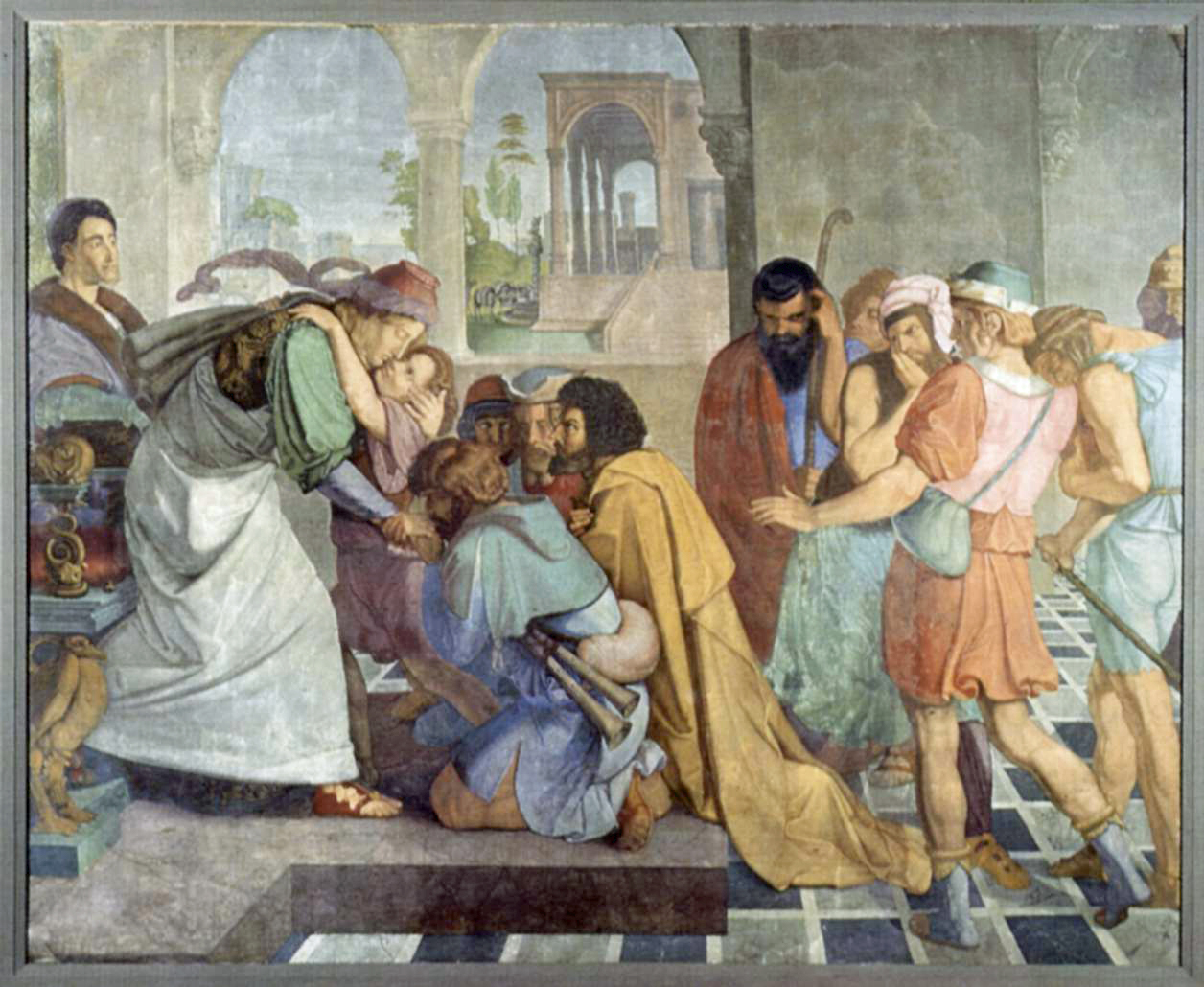
Joseph reveals himself to his brothers, by Peter von Cornelius

- Genesis 37:28

And there passed by Midianites, merchantmen; and they drew and lifted up Joseph out of the pit, and sold Joseph to the Ishmaelites for twenty shekels of silver. And they brought Joseph into Egypt.

(Joseph sold to slavery by his own brothers after their father Jacob sent him to check up on them.)

== Exodus ==
=== Exodus Chapter 12 ===
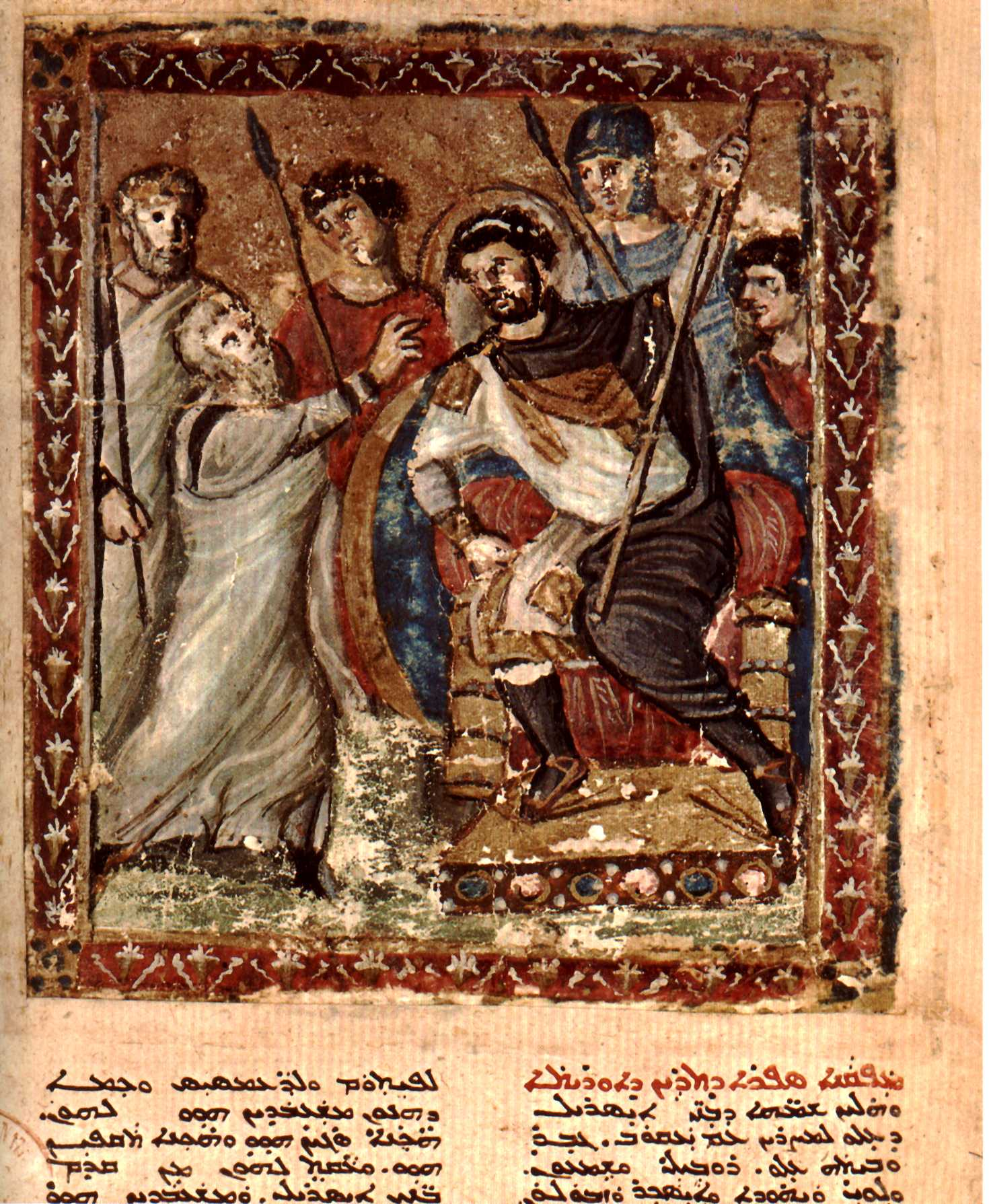
Moses before the Pharaoh, a 6th-century miniature from the Syriac Bible of Paris.

- Exodus 12:15

Seven days shall ye eat unleavened bread; howbeit the first day ye shall put away leaven out of your houses; for whosoever eateth leavened bread from the first day until the seventh day, that soul shall be cut off from Israel.

- Exodus 12:19

Seven days shall there be no leaven found in your houses; for whosoever eateth that which is leavened, that soul shall be cut off from the congregation of Israel, whether he be a sojourner, or one that is born in the land.

(The LORD speaks to Moses and Aaron just before the Exodus from the land of Egypt, proclaiming that anyone who eats leavened bread during a certain period of time will be "cut off".)

=== Exodus Chapter 17 ===
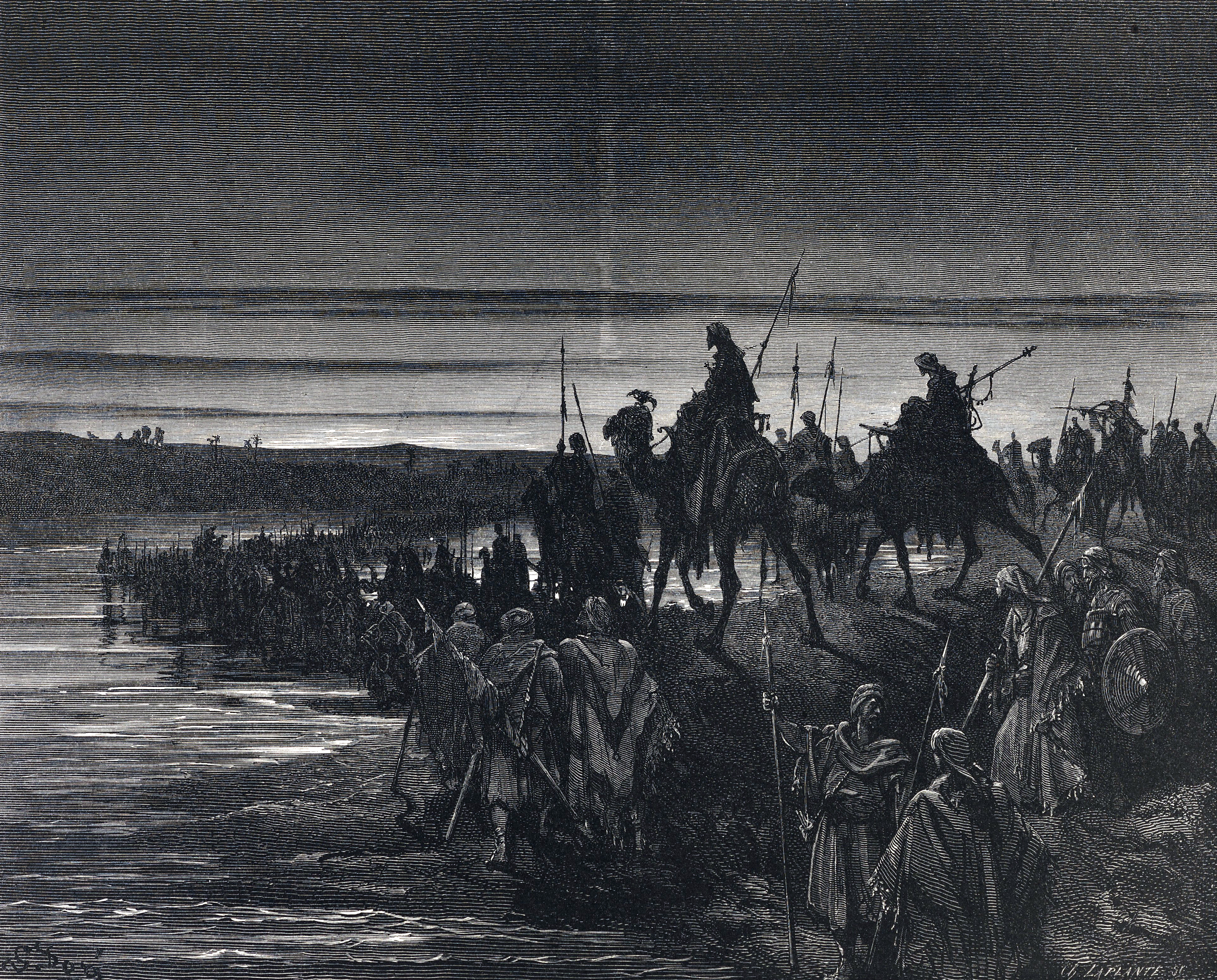
"The Children of Israel Crossing the Jordan" by Gustave Doré (d. 1883)

- Exodus 17:14

And the LORD said unto Moses: 'Write this for a memorial in the book, and rehearse it in the ears of Joshua: for I will utterly blot out the remembrance of Amalek from under heaven.'

(After the Amalekites attacked the Israelites in the desert and the Israelites retaliated under the command of Joshua.)

=== Exodus Chapter 30 ===
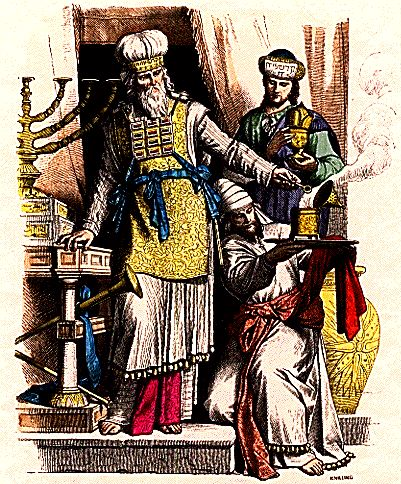
The High Priest

- Exodus 30:38

Whosoever shall make like unto that, to smell thereof, he shall be cut off from his people.'

(Short time after the LORD commands the Israelites to anoint Aaron and his sons as priests. Proclamation to "cut off" anyone who tries to make their own offering—anyone who does not recognize Aaron and his sons as priests.)

=== Exodus Chapter 31 ===
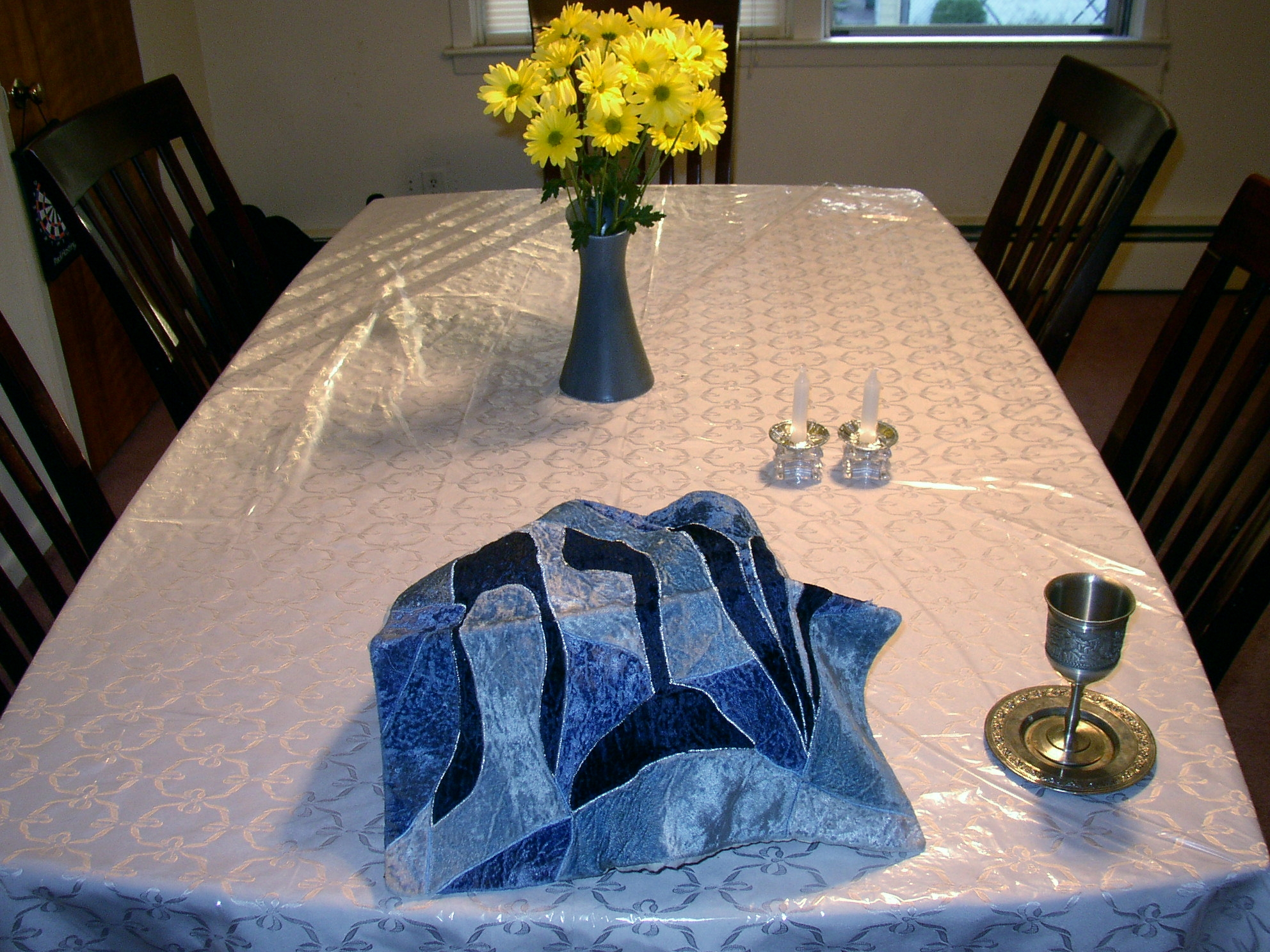
The Shabbat table is set: two covered challot, a kiddush cup, two candles, and flowers.

- Exodus 31:14

Ye shall keep the sabbath therefore, for it is holy unto you; every one that profaneth it shall surely be put to death; for whosoever doeth any work therein, that soul shall be cut off from among his people.

(Proclamation to "cut off" anyone who does not observe the Sabbath.)

=== Exodus Chapter 32 ===
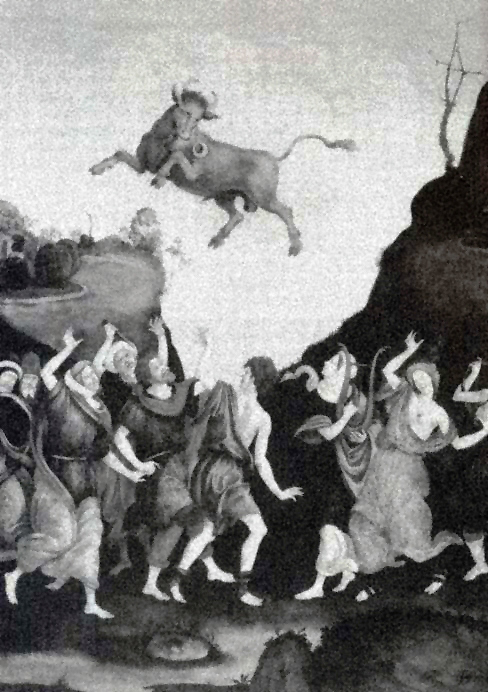
The Worship of the Golden Calf by Filippino Lippi (1457–1504)

- Exodus 32:32

Yet now, if Thou wilt forgive their sin--; and if not, blot me, I pray Thee, out of Thy book which Thou hast written.'

(Moses begs the LORD to forgive the Israelites for the Sin of the Golden Calf, or to otherwise, "blot out" him as well.)

- Exodus 32:33

And the LORD said unto Moses: 'Whosoever hath sinned against Me, him will I blot out of My book.

(Proclamation just before additional Israelites are smitten/blotted out by the LORD for making the Golden Calf.)

== Leviticus ==
=== Leviticus Chapter 7 ===
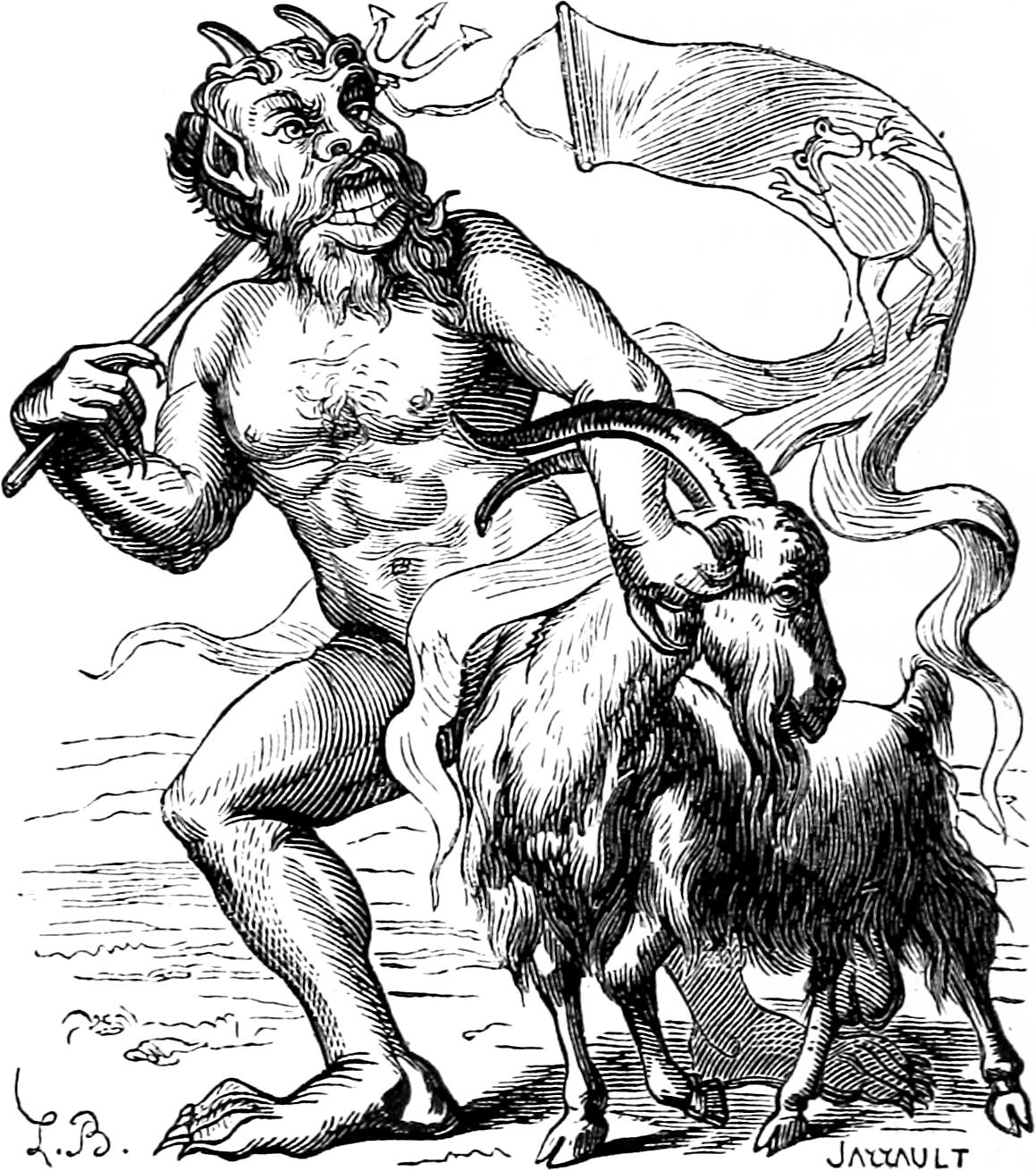
A modern interpretation of Azazel as a Satanic, goatlike demon, from Collin de Plancy's Dictionnaire Infernal (Paris,1825).

- Leviticus 7:20

But the soul that eateth of the flesh of the sacrifice of peace-offerings, that pertain unto the LORD, having his uncleanness upon him, that soul shall be cut off from his people.

- Leviticus 7:21

And when any one shall touch any unclean thing, whether it be the uncleanness of man, or an unclean beast, or any unclean detestable thing, and eat of the flesh of the sacrifice of peace-offerings, which pertain unto the LORD, that soul shall be cut off from his people.

(Proclamation to "cut off" anyone who eats certain "unclean" flesh, or the flesh of certain sacrificial offerings.)

- Leviticus 7:27

Whosoever it be that eateth any blood, that soul shall be cut off from his people.

(Proclamation to "cut off" anyone for consuming blood.)

=== Leviticus Chapter 13 ===
- Leviticus 13:46

All the days wherein the plague is in him he shall be unclean; he is unclean; he shall dwell alone; without the camp shall his dwelling be.

(Proclamation to quarantine persons exhibiting illness.)

=== Leviticus Chapter 16 ===
- Leviticus 16:10

But the goat, on which the lot fell for Azazel, shall be set alive before the LORD, to make atonement over him, to send him away for Azazel into the wilderness.

(The goat is sent away to die alone in the desert in the place of a person, who according to the Leviticus ideology deserves the same punishment due to his sins, and would have had to bear this punishment, had the punishment not been "transferred" onto the goat.)

=== Leviticus Chapter 17 ===
- Leviticus 17:4

and hath not brought it unto the door of the tent of meeting, to present it as an offering unto the LORD before the tabernacle of the LORD, blood shall be imputed unto that man; he hath shed blood; and that man shall be cut off from among his people.

(Proclamation to "cut off" anyone who kills an animal for this own benefit.)

- Leviticus 17:9

and bringeth it not unto the door of the tent of meeting, to sacrifice it unto the LORD, even that man shall be cut off from his people.

(Proclamation to "cut off" anyone who attempts to make a sacrifice by himself rather than have the recognized priests do it.)

- Leviticus 17:10

And whatsoever man there be of the house of Israel, or of the strangers that sojourn among them, that eateth any manner of blood, I will set My face against that soul that eateth blood, and will cut him off from among his people.

- Leviticus 17:14

For as to the life of all flesh, the blood thereof is all one with the life thereof; therefore I said unto the children of Israel: Ye shall eat the blood of no manner of flesh; for the life of all flesh is the blood thereof; whosoever eateth it shall be cut off.

(Proclamations to "cut off" anyone who consumes blood.)

=== Leviticus Chapter 18 ===
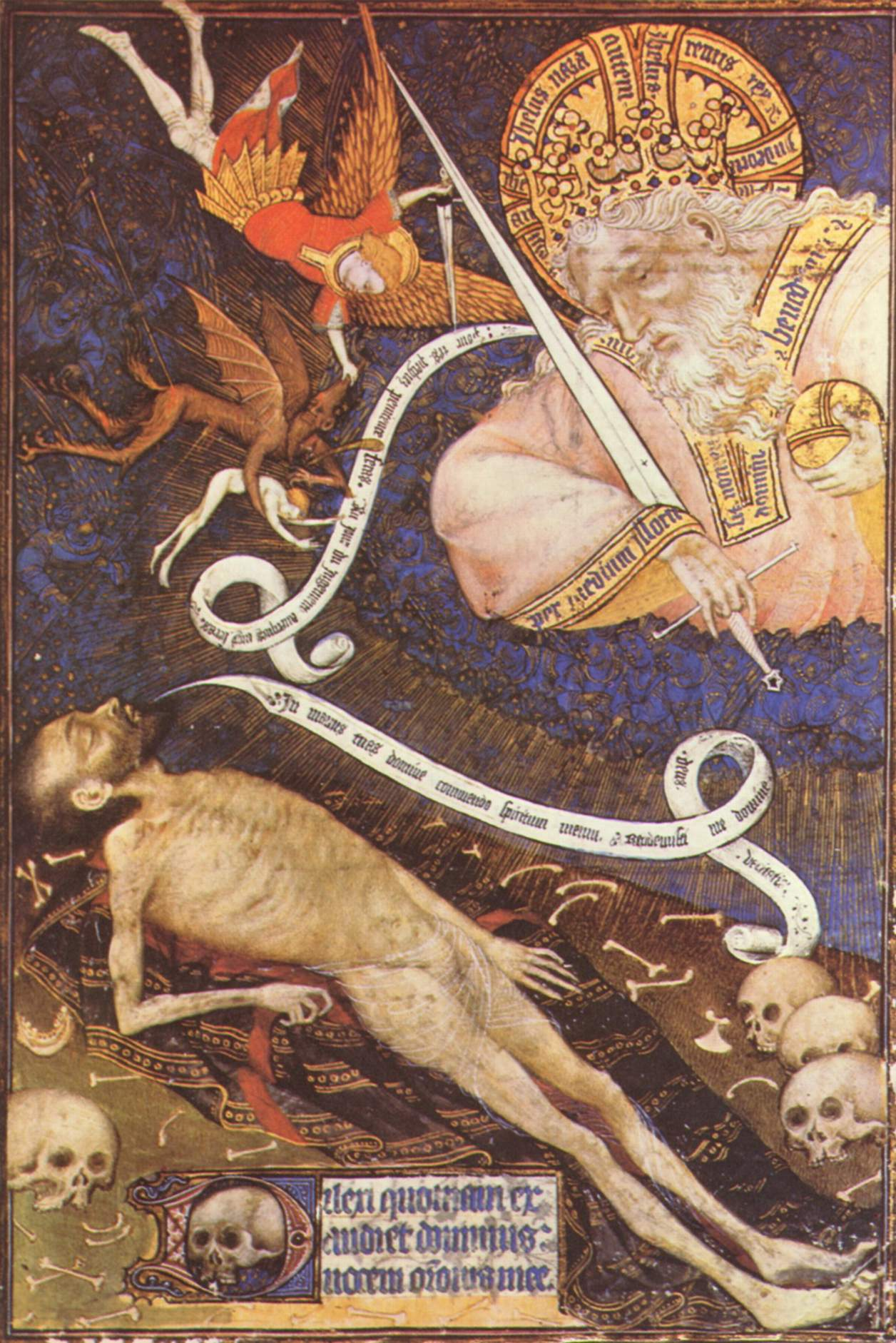
A painting of God watching as an angel and a demon fight for a man's soul

- Leviticus 18:29

For whosoever shall do any of these abominations, even the souls that do them shall be cut off from among their people.

(This follows descriptions of various sexual offenses.)

=== Leviticus Chapter 19 ===
- Leviticus 19:8

But every one that eateth it shall bear his iniquity, because he hath profaned the holy thing of the LORD; and that soul shall be cut off from his people.

(Proclamation to "cut off" anyone who eats a certain kind of peace offering on the 3rd day or later.)

=== Leviticus Chapter 20 ===
- Leviticus 20:3

I also will set My face against that man, and will cut him off from among his people, because he hath given of his seed unto Molech, to defile My sanctuary, and to profane My holy name.

- Leviticus 20:5

then I will set My face against that man, and against his family, and will cut him off, and all that go astray after him, to go astray after Molech, from among their people.

- Leviticus 20:6

And the soul that turneth unto the ghosts, and unto the familiar spirits, to go astray after them, I will even set My face against that soul, and will cut him off from among his people.

(Proclamations to "cut off" anyone who "gives his seed to Molech" -- sacrifices his children onto a foreign god.)

- Leviticus 20:17

And if a man shall take his sister, his father's daughter, or his mother's daughter, and see her nakedness, and she see his nakedness: it is a shameful thing; and they shall be cut off in the sight of the children of their people: he hath uncovered his sister's nakedness; he shall bear his iniquity.

- Leviticus 20:18

And if a man shall lie with a woman having her sickness, and shall uncover her nakedness—he hath made naked her fountain, and she hath uncovered the fountain of her blood—both of them shall be cut off from among their people.

(Proclamations to "cut off" anyone engaging in various sexual offenses.)

=== Leviticus Chapter 22 ===
- Leviticus 22:3

Say unto them: Whosoever he be of all your seed throughout your generations, that approacheth unto the holy things, which the children of Israel hallow unto the LORD, having his uncleanness upon him, that soul shall be cut off from before Me: I am the LORD.

(Proclamations to "cut off" anyone for incorrectly using objects used for worship.)

=== Leviticus Chapter 23 ===
- Leviticus 23:29For whatsoever soul it be that shall not be afflicted in that same day, he shall be cut off from his people.

(Proclamation to "cut off" anyone who does not atone on the Day of Atonement—Yom Kippur.)

=== Leviticus Chapter 26 ===
- Leviticus 26:33

And you will I scatter among the nations, and I will draw out the sword after you; and your land shall be a desolation, and your cities shall be a waste.

(Proclamation to expel the Israelites from the land if they fail to adhere to the ideology of the book of Leviticus. Follows descriptions of various related curses.)

== Numbers ==
=== Numbers Chapter 5 ===
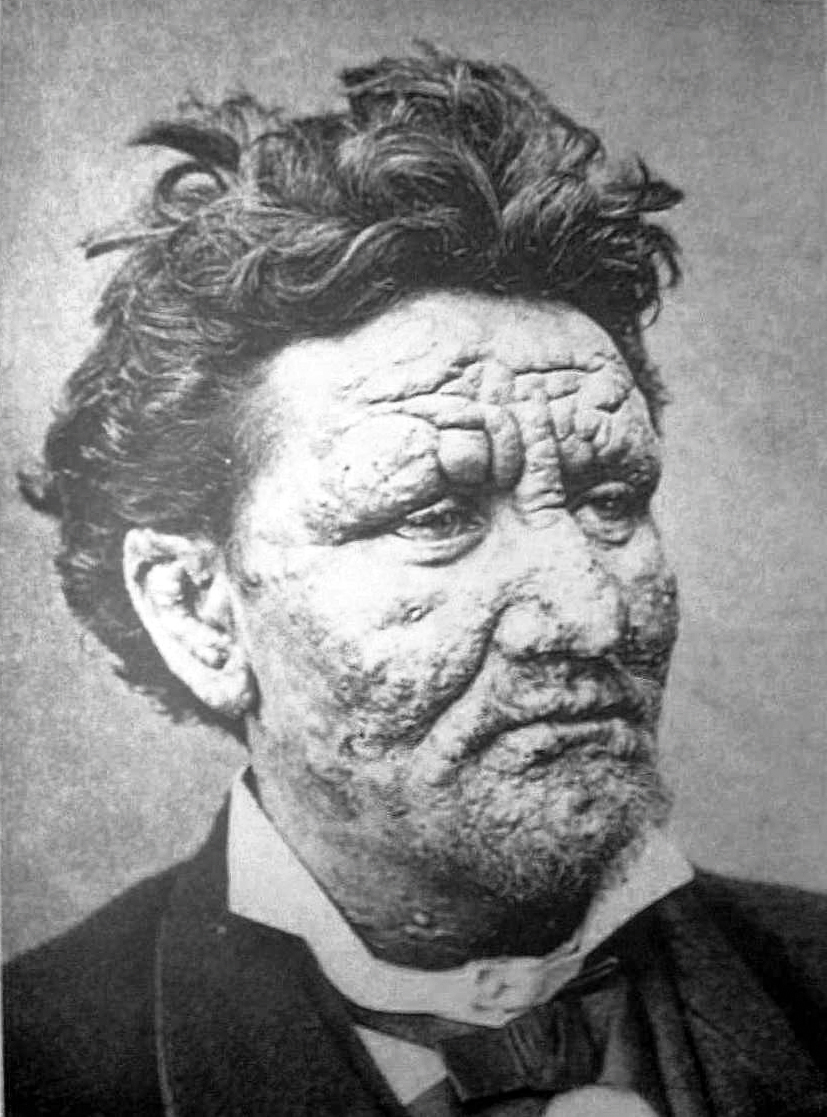
Leprosy

- Numbers 5:2

'Command the children of Israel, that they put out of the camp every leper, and every one that hath an issue, and whosoever is unclean by the dead;

- Numbers 5:3<

both male and female shall ye put out, without the camp shall ye put them; that they defile not their camp, in the midst whereof I dwell.'

- Numbers 5:4

And the children of Israel did so, and put them out without the camp; as the LORD spoke unto Moses, so did the children of Israel.

(Proclamation to "put out" anyone afflicted by leprosy, as this is considered to "defile" the camp. This is done according to 5:4.)

=== Numbers Chapter 9 ===
- Numbers 9:13

But the man that is clean, and is not on a journey, and forbeareth to keep the passover, that soul shall be cut off from his people; because he brought not the offering of the LORD in its appointed season, that man shall bear his sin.

(Proclamation to "cut off" anyone for not observing Passover.)

=== Numbers Chapter 15 ===
- Numbers 15:30

But the soul that doeth aught with a high hand, whether he be home-born or a stranger, the same blasphemeth the LORD; and that soul shall be cut off from among his people.

(Proclamation to "cut off" anyone who knowingly and deliberately violates the covenant.)

=== Numbers Chapter 19 ===
- Numbers 19:13

Whosoever toucheth the dead, even the body of any man that is dead, and purifieth not himself—he hath defiled the tabernacle of the LORD—that soul shall be cut off from Israel; because the water of sprinkling was not dashed against him, he shall be unclean; his uncleanness is yet upon him.

(Proclamation to "cut off" anyone who does not "purify" himself after being around a dead body before attempting to worship.)

== Deuteronomy ==
=== Deuteronomy Chapter 29 ===
- Deuteronomy 29:19

the LORD will not be willing to pardon him, but then the anger of the LORD and His jealousy shall be kindled against that man, and all the curse that is written in this book shall lie upon him, and the LORD shall blot out his name from under heaven;

(Proclamation to "blot out" "from under heaven" anyone who "turns away from the LORD".)

- Deuteronomy 29:27

and the LORD rooted them out of their land in anger, and in wrath, and in great indignation, and cast them into another land, as it is this day'.--

== See also ==
- Babylonian captivity
- Biblical Egypt
- Exile
