= 1823 in art =

Events in the year 1823 in art.

== Events ==
- 5 May – The Royal Academy Exhibition of 1823 opens at Somerset House in London

== Works ==
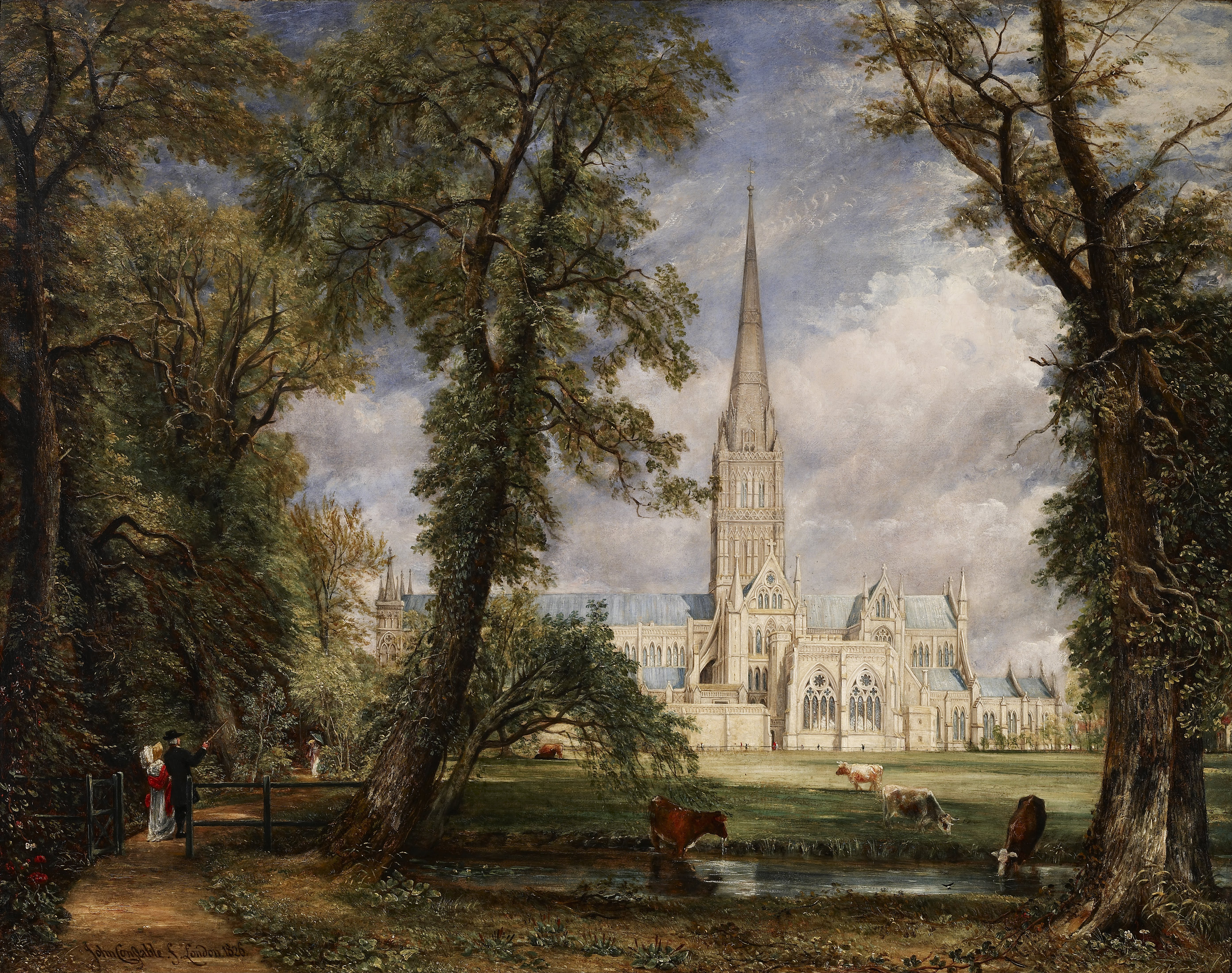
Constable – Salisbury Cathedral from the Bishop's Grounds

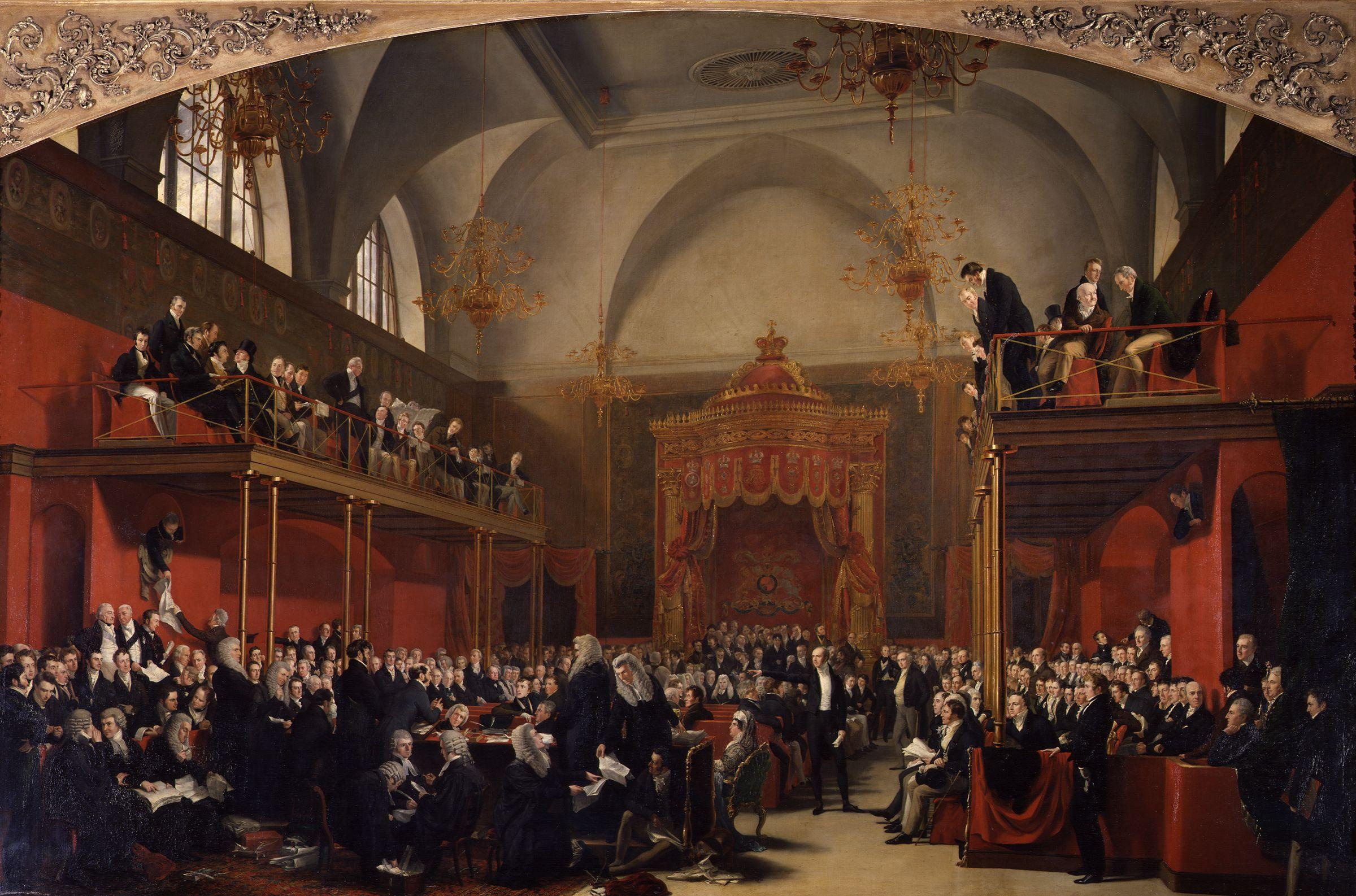
Hayter – The Trial of Queen Caroline

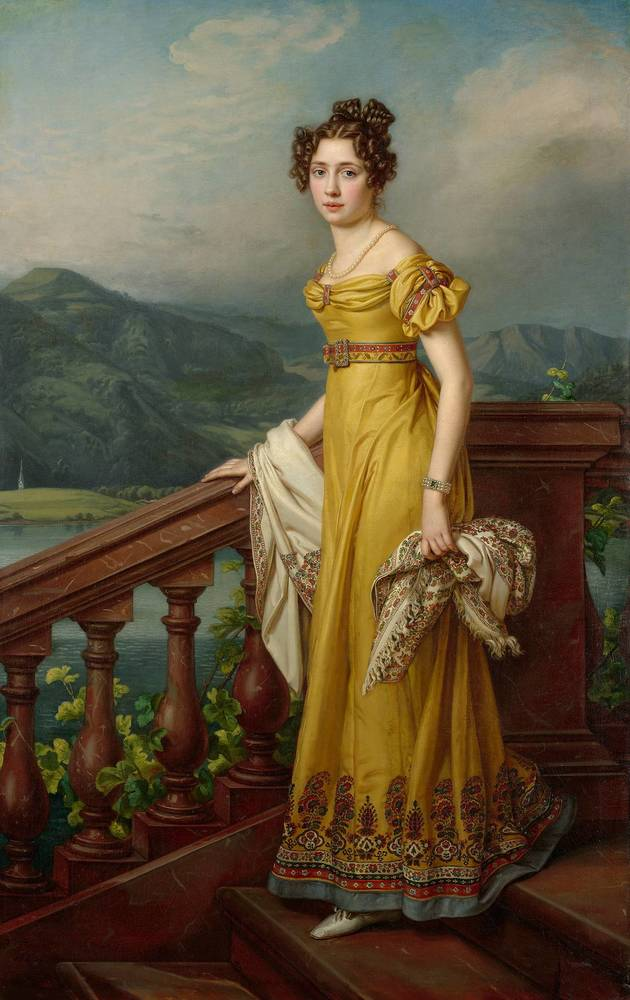
Stieler – Portrait of Amalie Auguste of Bavaria

- Henry Perronet Briggs – The Discovery of the Gunpowder Plot
- John Constable
  - Gillingham Bridge
  - Salisbury Cathedral from the Bishop's Grounds
- Eugène Delacroix – Rebecca and the Wounded Ivanhoe
- Charles Lock Eastlake
  - The Celian Hill from the Palatine
  - An Italian Contadina and Her Children
- Caspar David Friedrich – Hutten's Grave
- Théodore Géricault – A Charge of Cuirassiers
- Anne-Louis Girodet de Roussy-Trioson –Portrait of Madame Reiset
- Francisco Goya – Portrait of Don Ramón Satué
- Francesco Hayez
  - Antonietta Vitali Sola
  - Conte Ninni
  - The Last Kiss of Romeo and Juliet
- George Hayter – The Trial of Queen Caroline
- Henry Inman – Rip Van Winkle Awakening from His Long Sleep
- John Martin – The Seventh Plague of Egypt
- James Arthur O'Connor – View of Irishtown from Sandymount
- Rembrandt Peale –
  - Portrait of DeWitt Clinton
  - Washington Before Yorktown
- Henry Raeburn – Portrait of Sir Walter Scott
- Ary Scheffer – Saint Thomas Preaching During a Storm
- Joseph Karl Stieler – Portrait of Amalie Auguste of Bavaria
- Gilbert Stuart
  - Portrait of John Adams (Museum of Fine Arts, Boston)
  - Portrait of Jean-Louis Lefebvre de Cheverus
- J.M.W. Turner – The Bay of Baiae, with Apollo and the Sibyl
- Horace Vernet
  - Allan M'Aulay
  - Portrait of Théodore Géricault
- Ferdinand Waldmüller – Portrait of Ludwig van Beethoven
- James Ward – The Deer Stealer
- David Wilkie
  - The Gentle Shepherd
  - The Parish Beadle
  - Portrait of the Duke of York

== Births ==
- March 1 – Charles Callahan Perkins, American art critic and author (died 1886)
- March 31 – William Hart, Scottish-born American landscape painter (died 1894)
- May 9 – Thomas Dalziel, English engraver (died 1906)
- August 8 – Théodule Ribot, French realist painter (died 1891)
- September 28 – Alexandre Cabanel, French painter (died 1889)
- December 23 – Jozef Van Lerius, Belgian romantic-historical painter (died 1876)

== Deaths ==
- January/February – George Brookshaw, English painter and illustrator (born 1751)
- January 22 – John Julius Angerstein, Russian-born British art collector (born c. 1732)
- January 25 – Johann Heinrich Bleuler, Swiss painter (born 1758)
- February 3 – Étienne-Pierre-Adrien Gois, French sculptor (born 1731)
- February 16 – Pierre-Paul Prud'hon, French painter (born 1758)
- March 15 – Jean-Louis Anselin, French engraver (born 1754)
- March 20 – Grigory Ugryumov, Russian painter (born 1764)
- April 23 – Joseph Nollekens, British sculptor (born 1737)
- July 2 – Thomas Pardoe, English enameller noted for flower painting (born 1770)
- July 8 – Sir Henry Raeburn, Scottish portrait painter (born 1756)
- August 9 – Johan Erik Hedberg, Finnish painter (born 1767)
- October 21 – Aleksander Lauréus, Finnish painter (born 1783)
- December 4 – Luigi Acquisti, Italian sculptor mainly known for his works in the neoclassical style (born 1745)
- December 30 – Claude André Deseine, French sculptor (born 1740)
