= Royal Academy Exhibition of 1823 =

1823 art exhibition in London

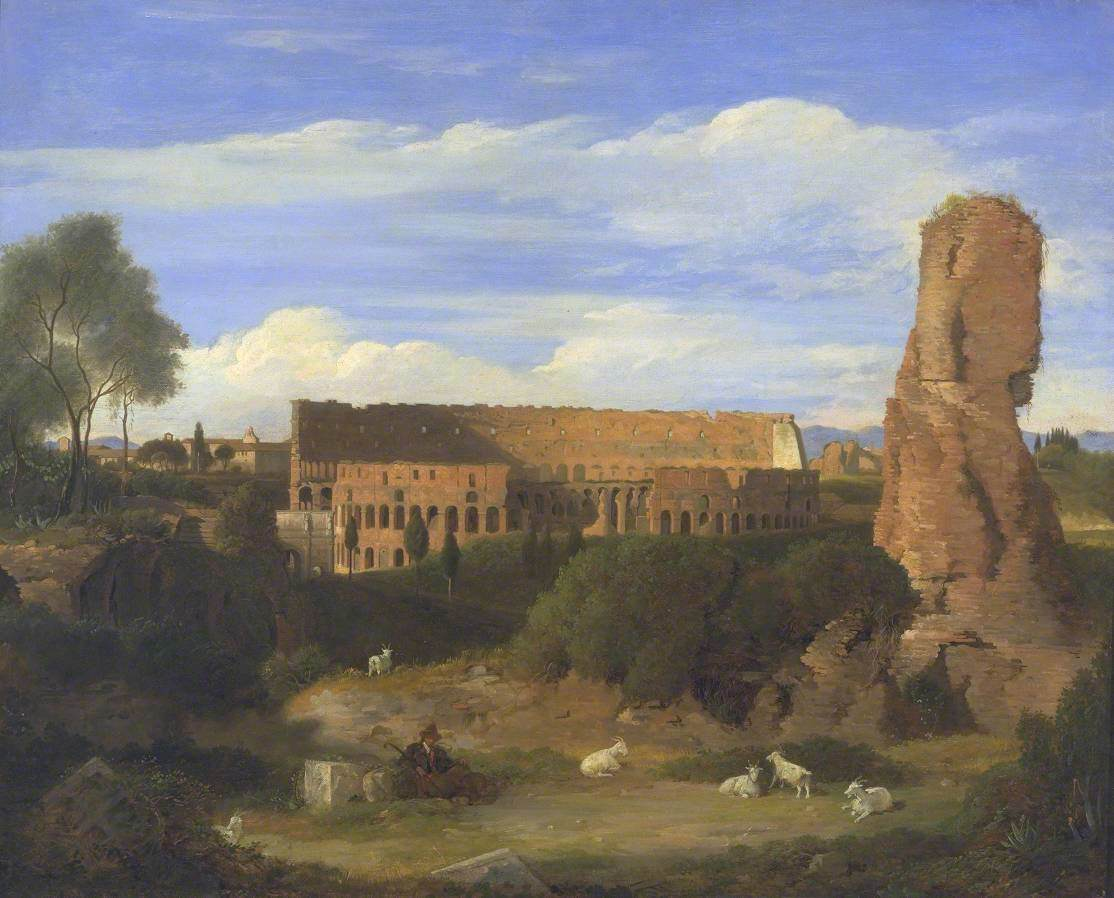
The Colosseum from the Campo Vaccino by Charles Lock Eastlake

The Royal Academy Exhibition of 1823 was an art exhibition held at Somerset House in London. Running from 5 May to 12 July 1823. It was the fifty fifth annual Summer Exhibition of the British Royal Academy.

Several of the paintings were inspired by the Visit of George IV to Scotland the previous year. J.M.W. Turner, who had started but abandoned a planned series of paintings depicting the royal visit, instead sent in the landscape painting The Bay of Baiae. Inspired by his 1819 visit to Italy, it combines a depiction of the Bay of Baiae and a scene drawn from Roman mythology. John Constable displayed Salisbury Cathedral from the Bishop's Grounds, a view that became one of his favourites and one that he repeated several times with variations.

David Wilkie submitted the genre painting The Parish Beadle, which had been commissioned by the Home Secretary Robert Peel. He also displayed at portrait of the Duke of York, the brother of the King and heir to the throne. Thomas Phillips also exhibited a full-length portrait of the Duke. The President of the Royal Academy Sir Thomas Lawrence featured a range of fashionable Regency portraits. This included his Portrait of Frederick Robinson, featuring the politician and future Prime Minister.

Charles Lock Eastlake, a future President of the academy and then based in Rome, sent in The Colosseum from the Campo Vaccino

== Gallery ==
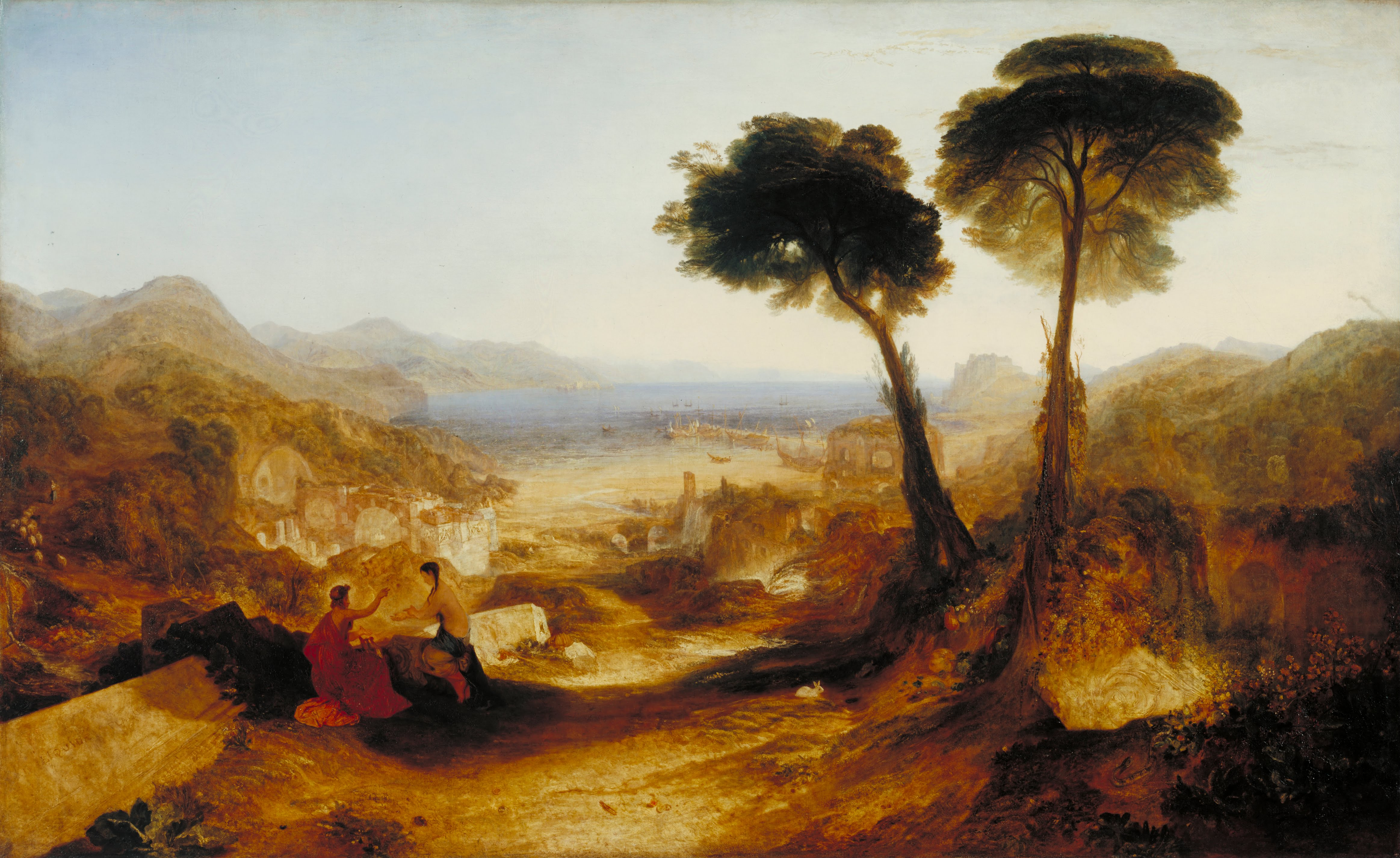
The Bay of Baiae by J.M.W. Turner

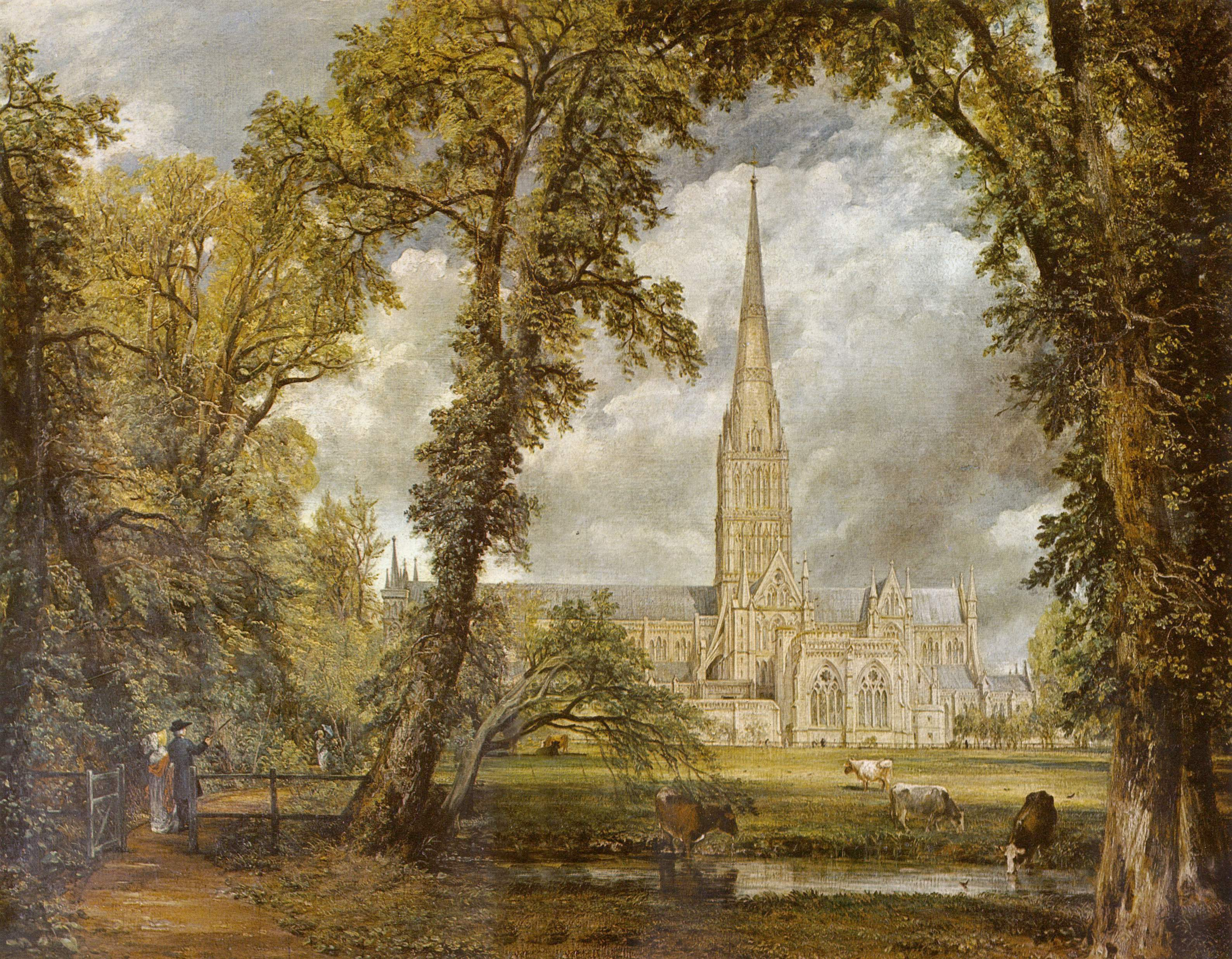
Salisbury Cathedral from the Bishop's Grounds by John Constable

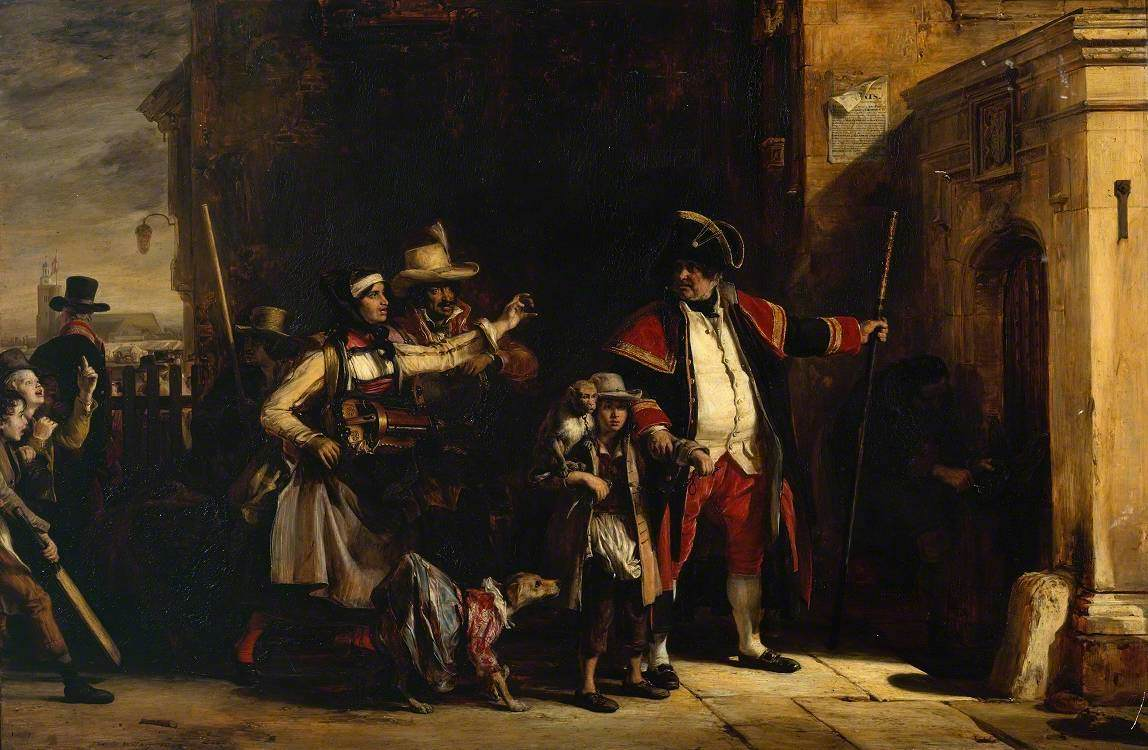
The Parish Beadle by David Wilkie

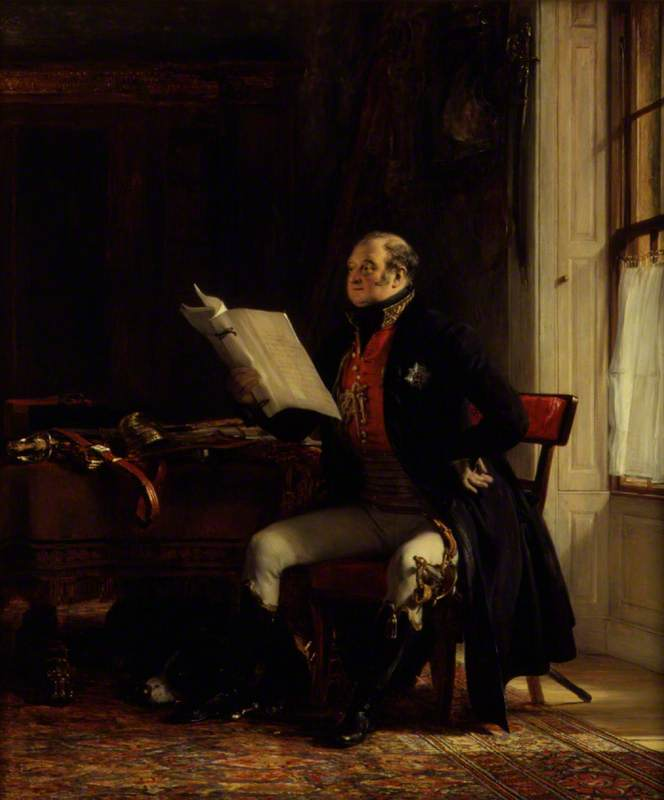
Portrait of the Duke of York by David Wilkie

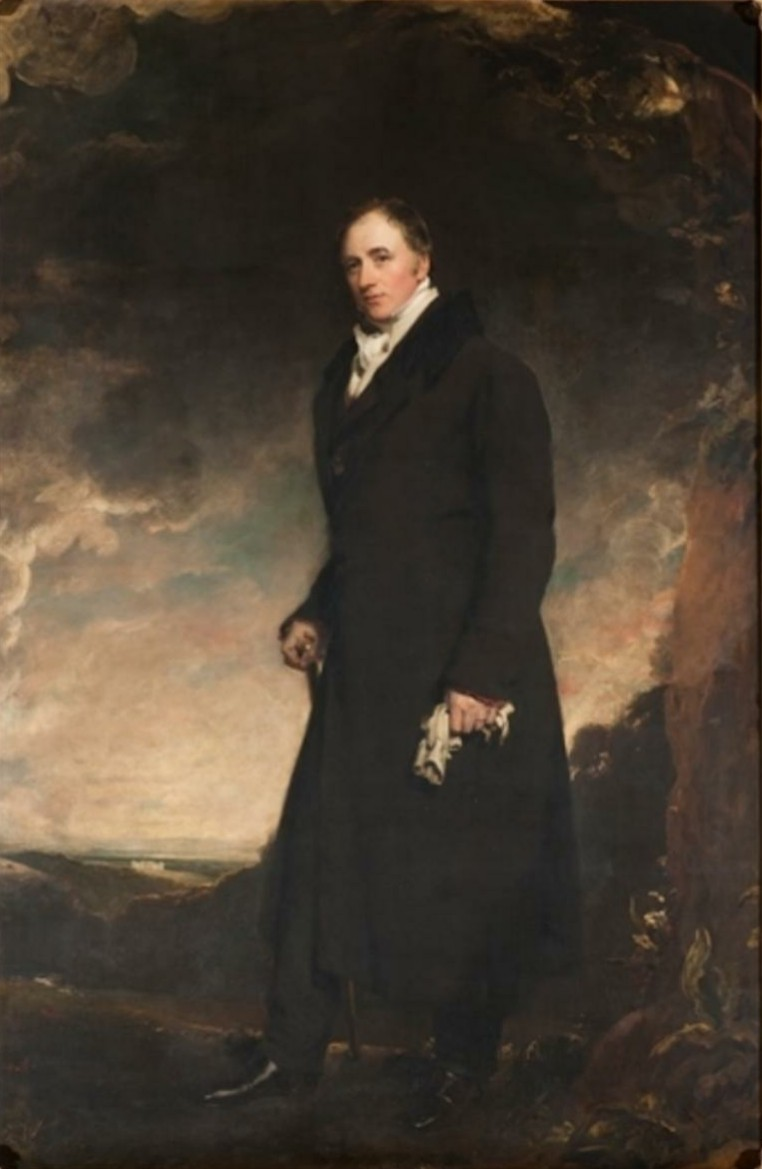
Earl of Harewood by Thomas Lawrence

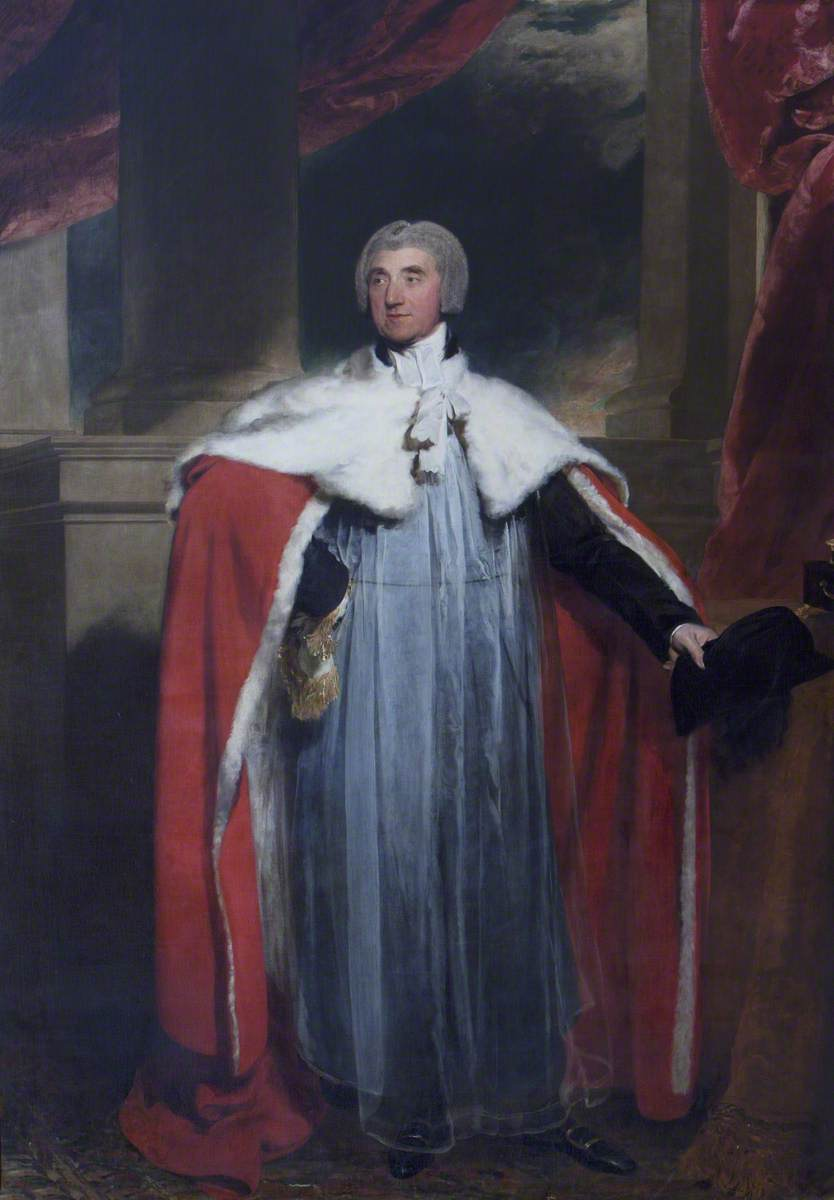
Edward Venables-Vernon-Harcourt by Thomas Lawrence

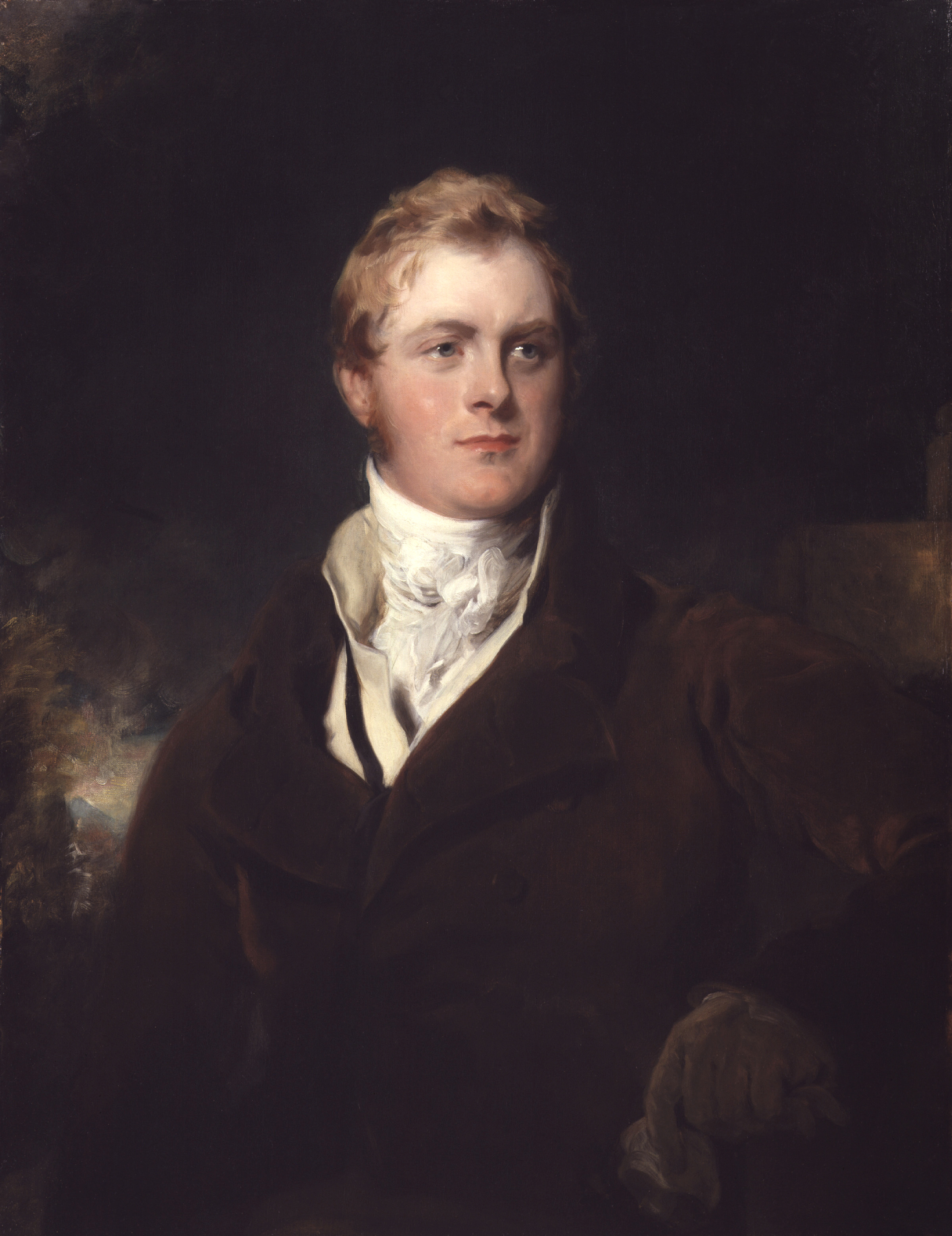
Portrait of Frederick Robinson by Thomas Lawrence

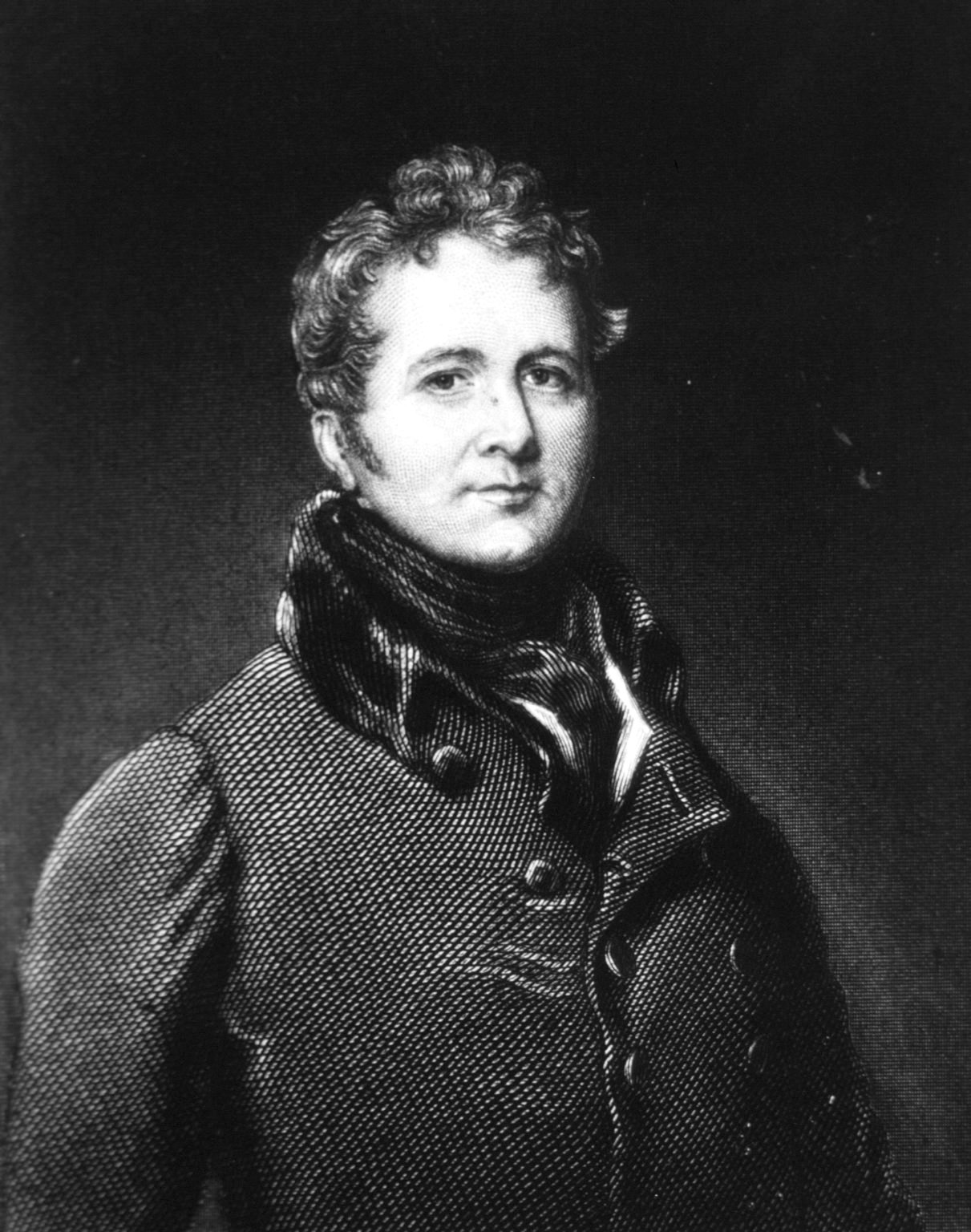
William Knighton, engraving based on the portrait by Thomas Lawrence

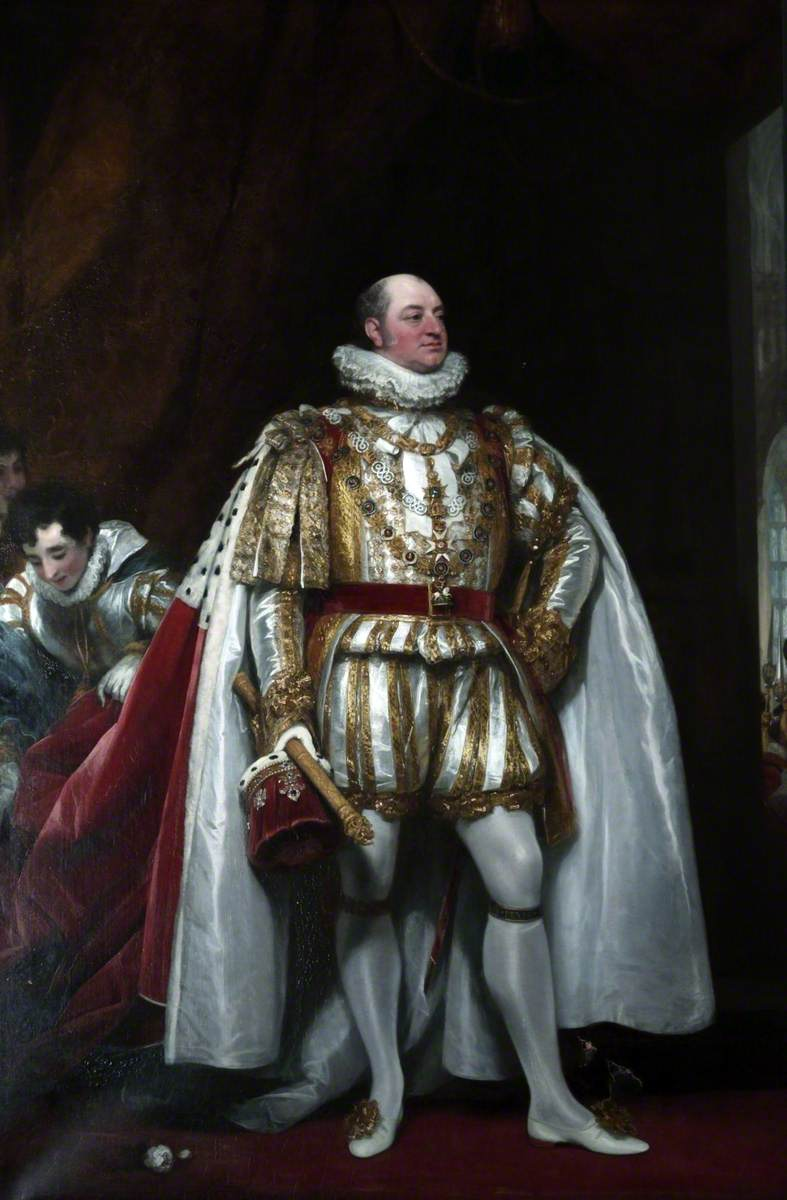
Duke of York by Thomas Phillips

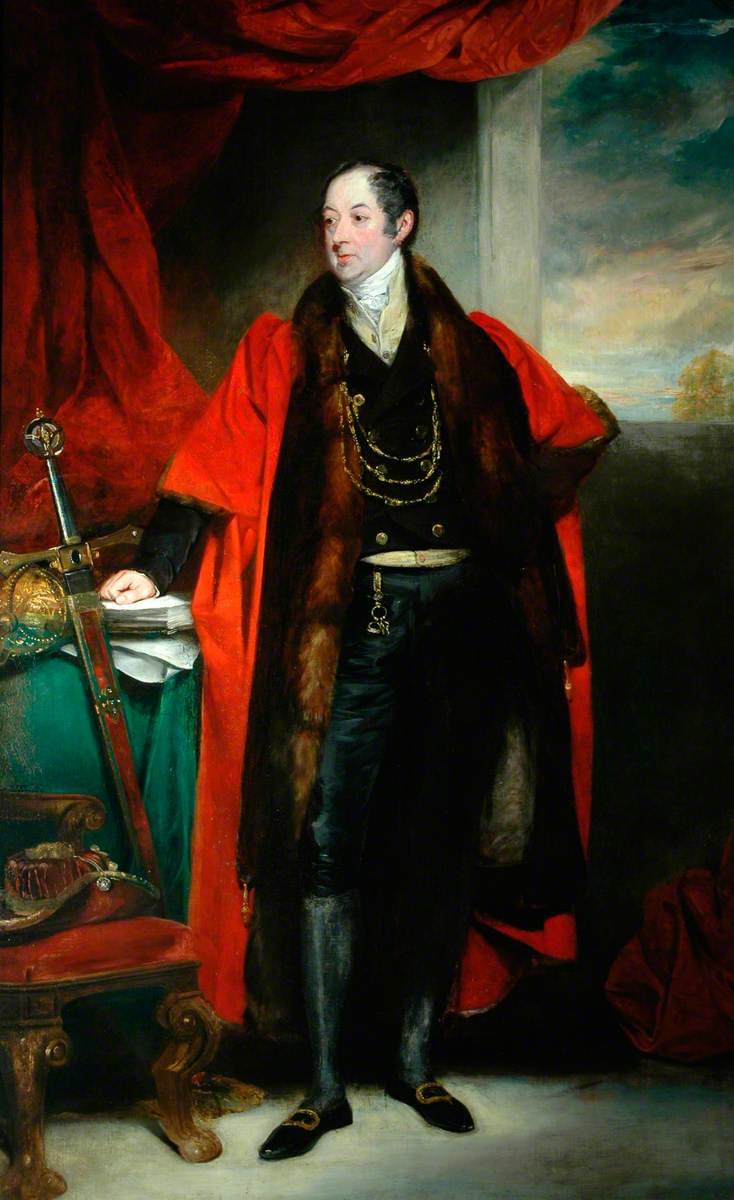
Lord Dundas by John Jackson

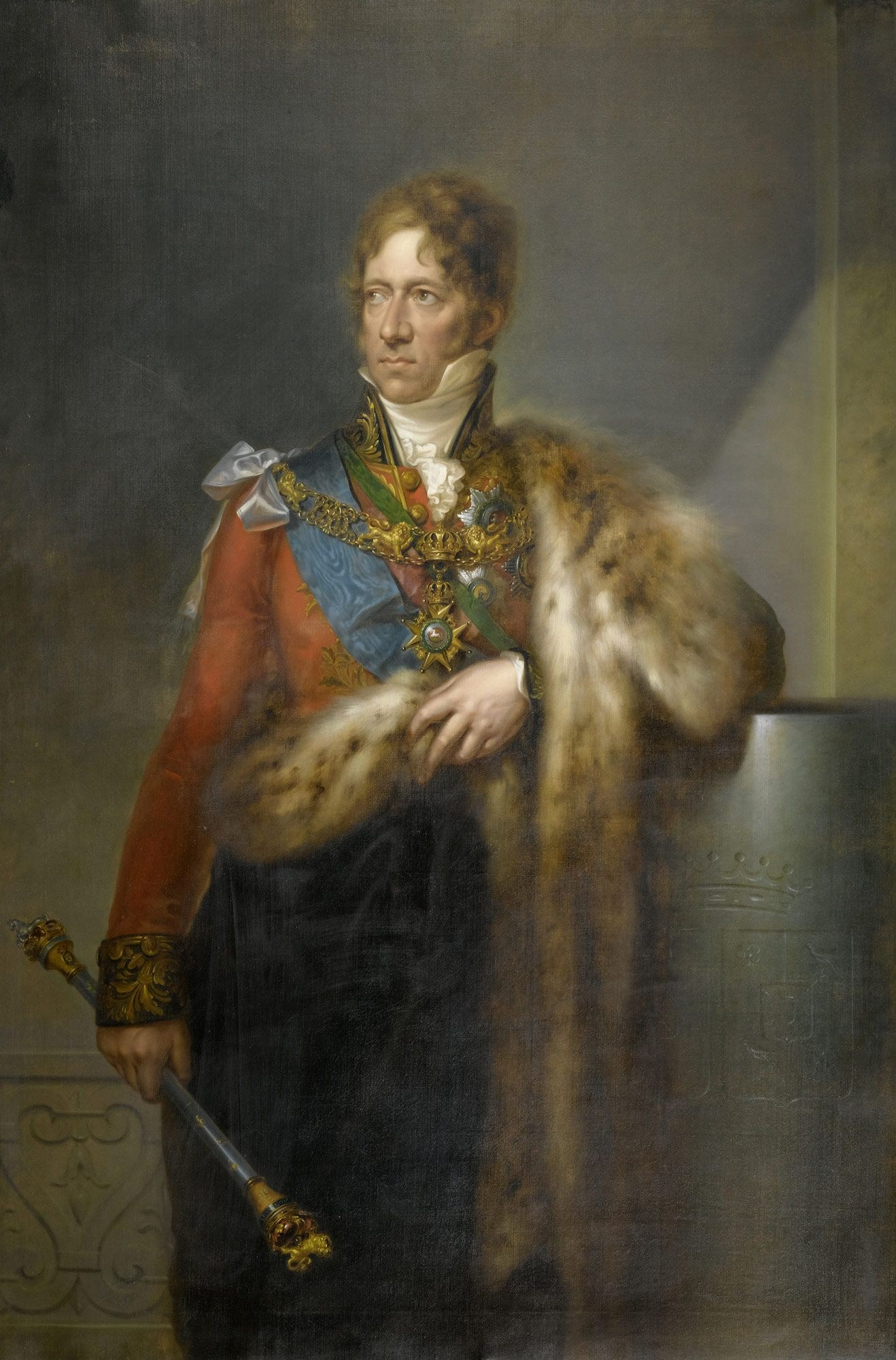
Count of Münster by Peter Edward Stroehling

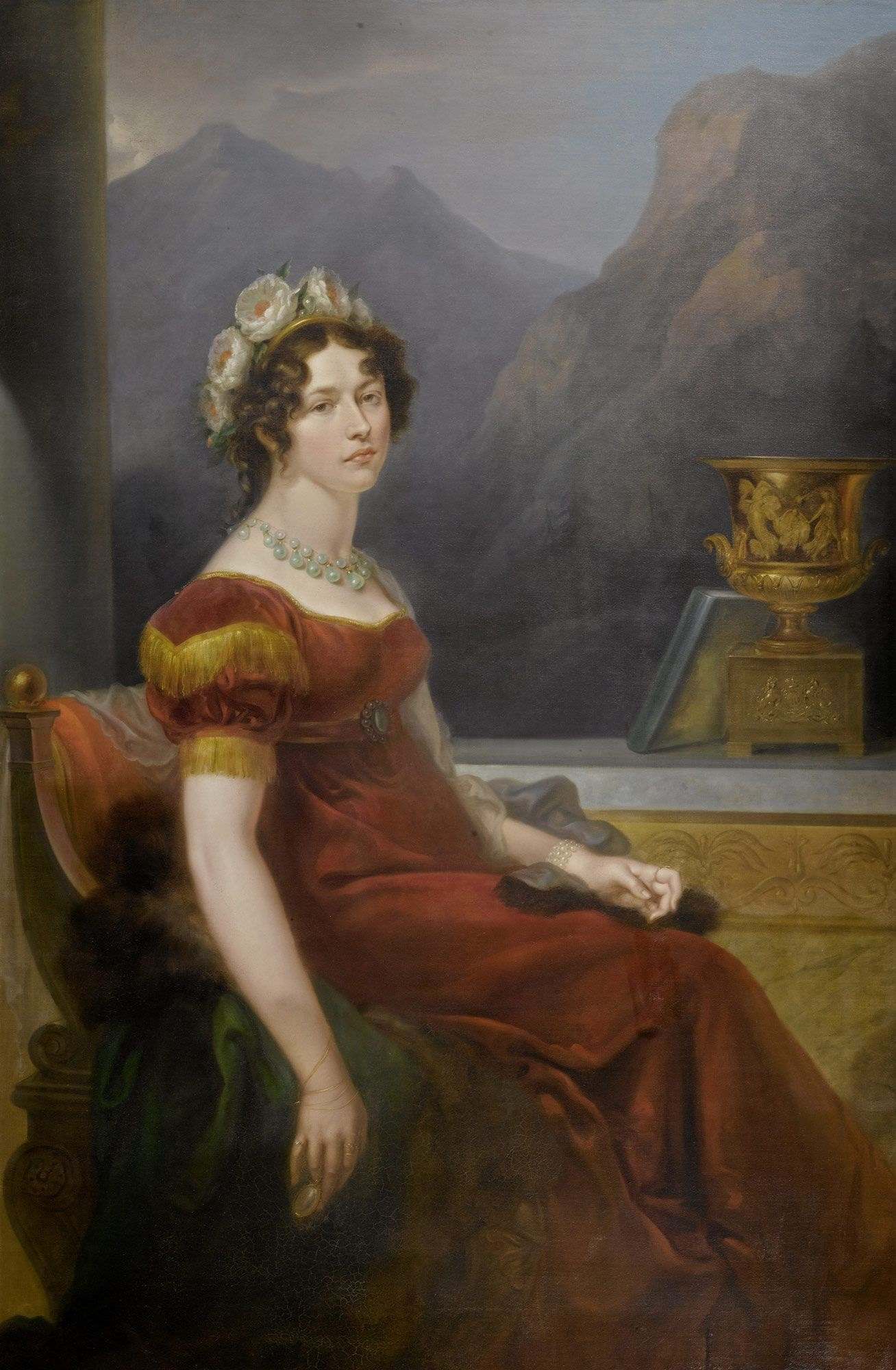
Countess of Münster by Peter Edward Stroehling

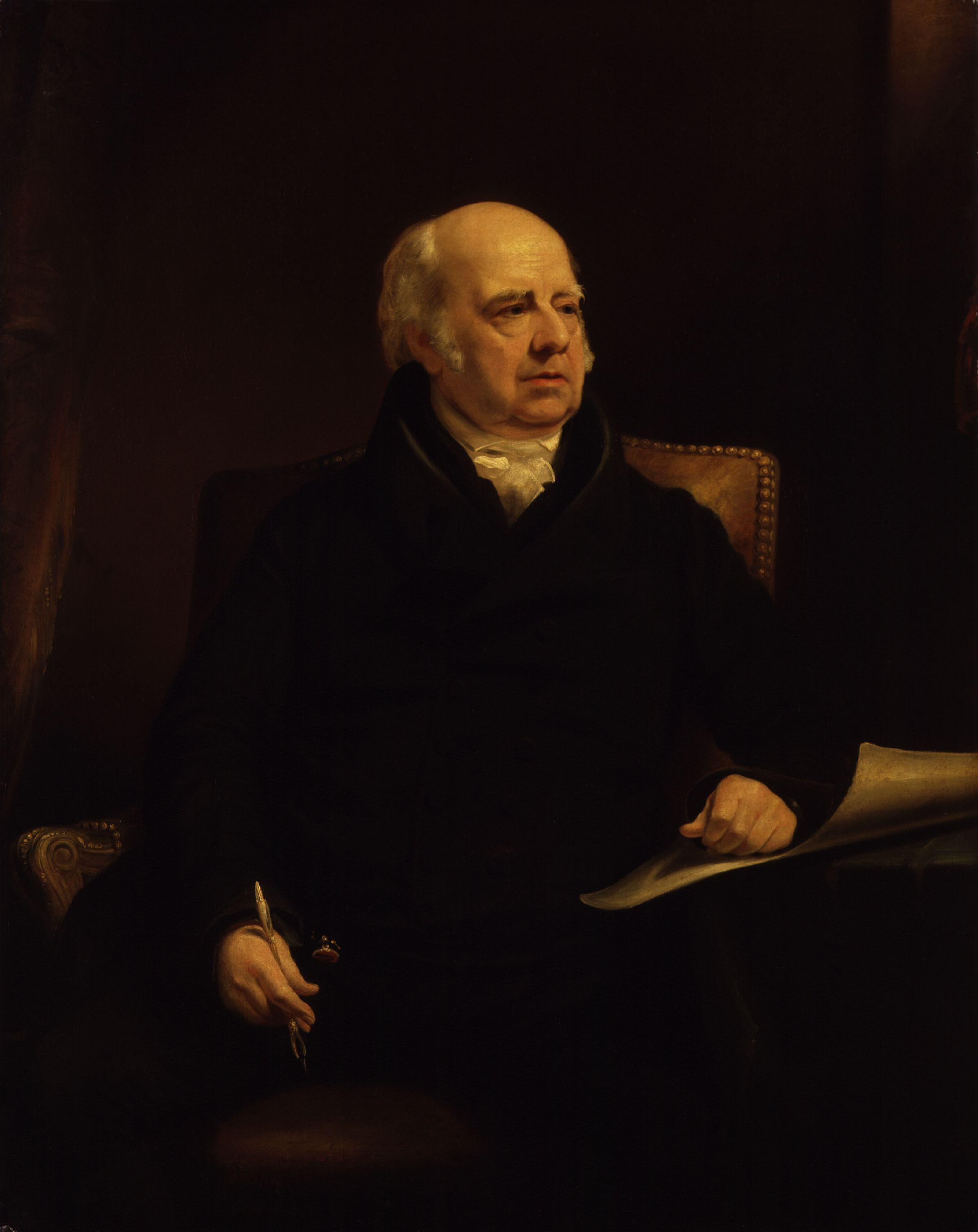
William Sharp by James Lonsdale

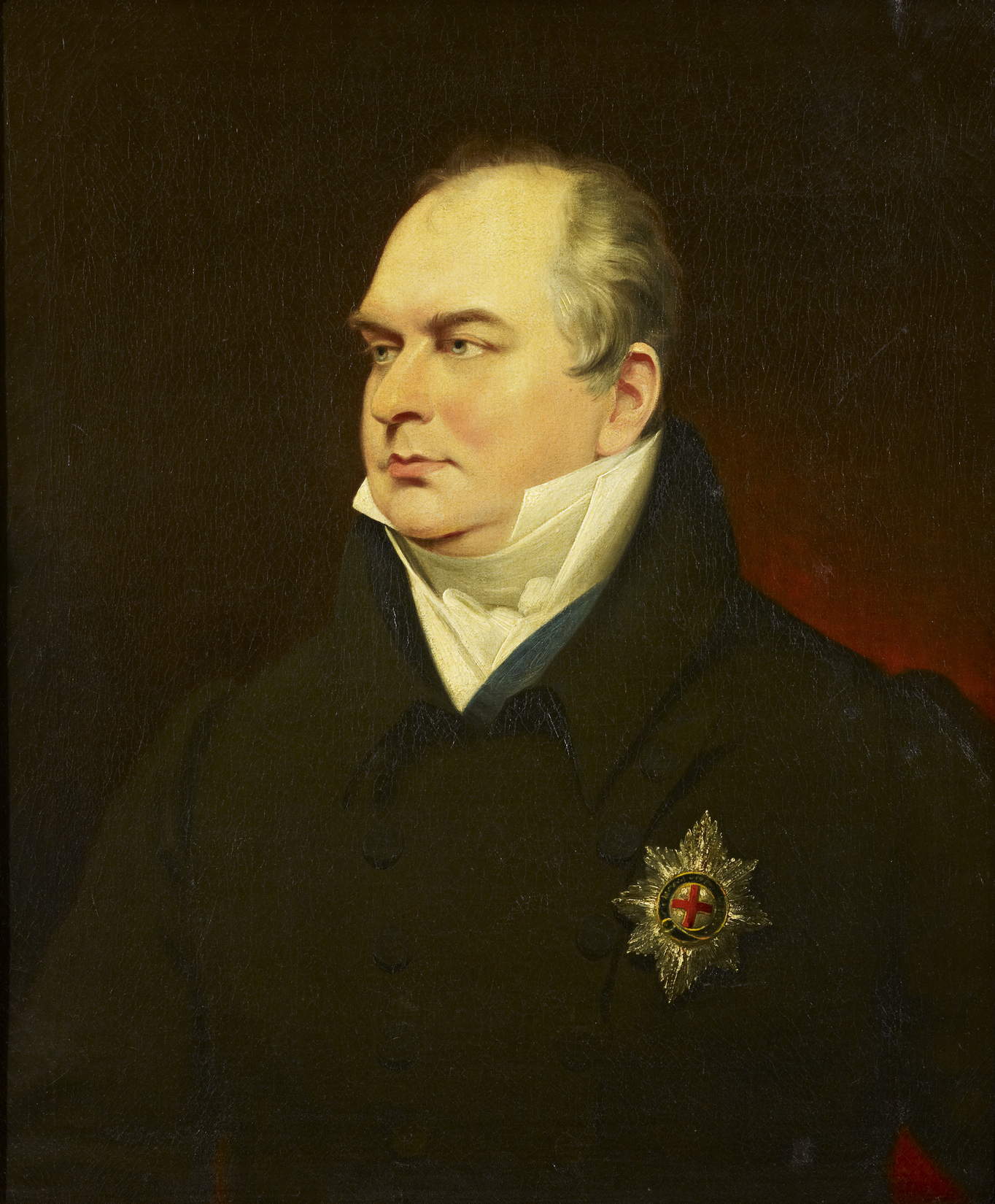
Duke of Sussex by James Lonsdale

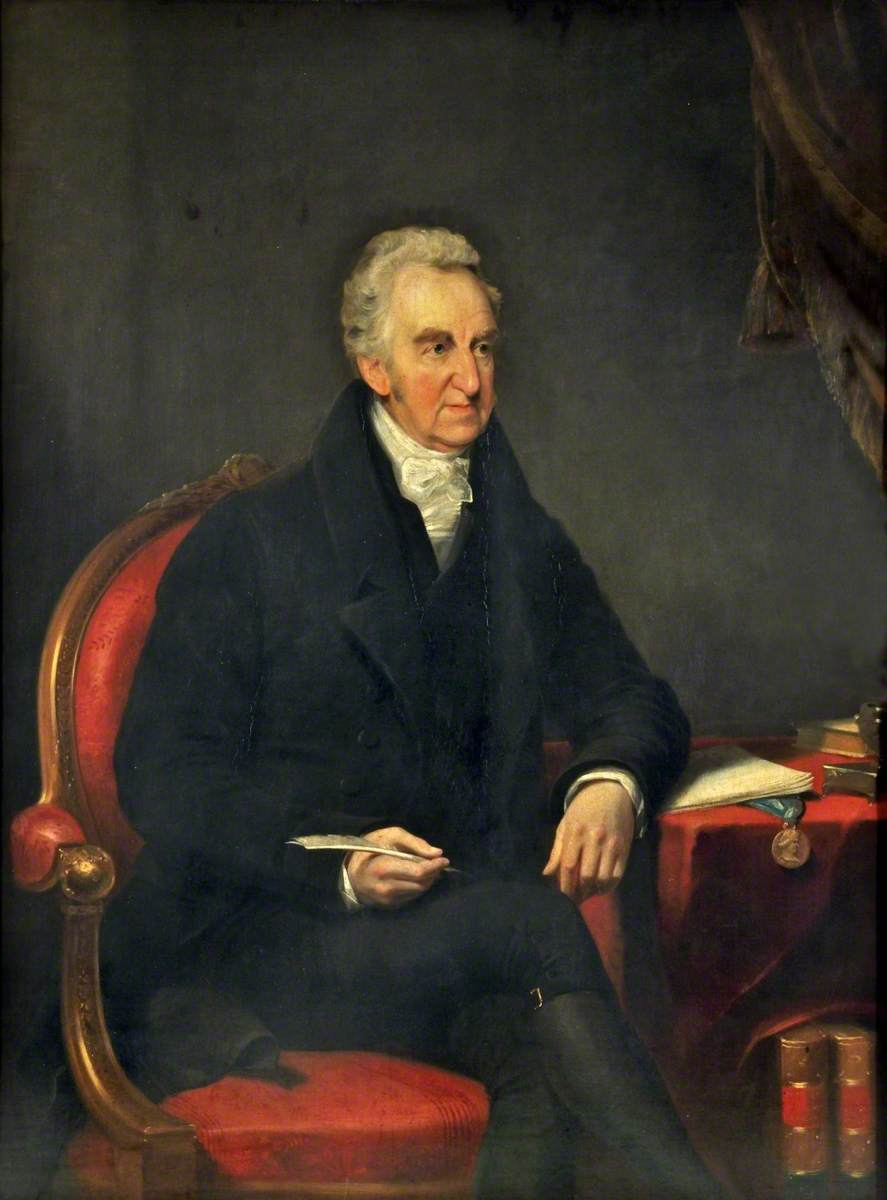
William Roscoe by James Lonsdale

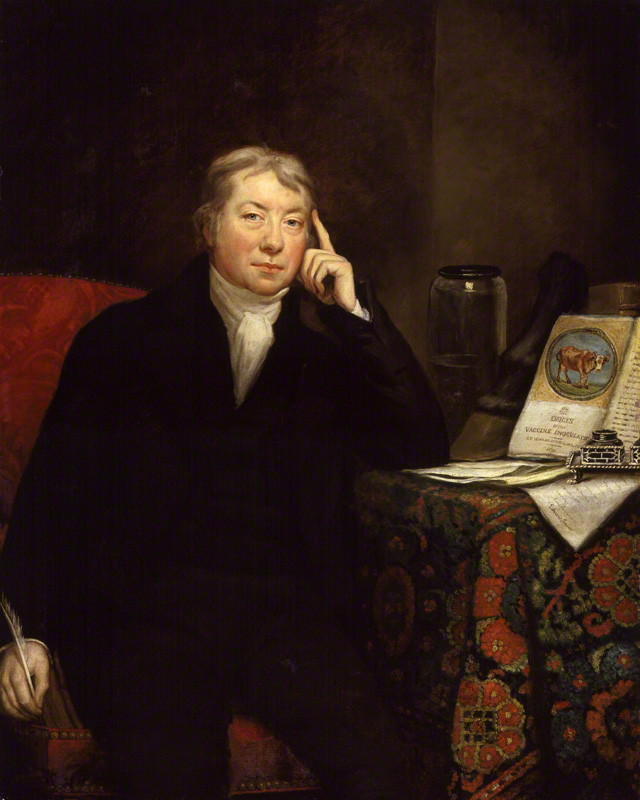
Edward Jenner by James Northcote

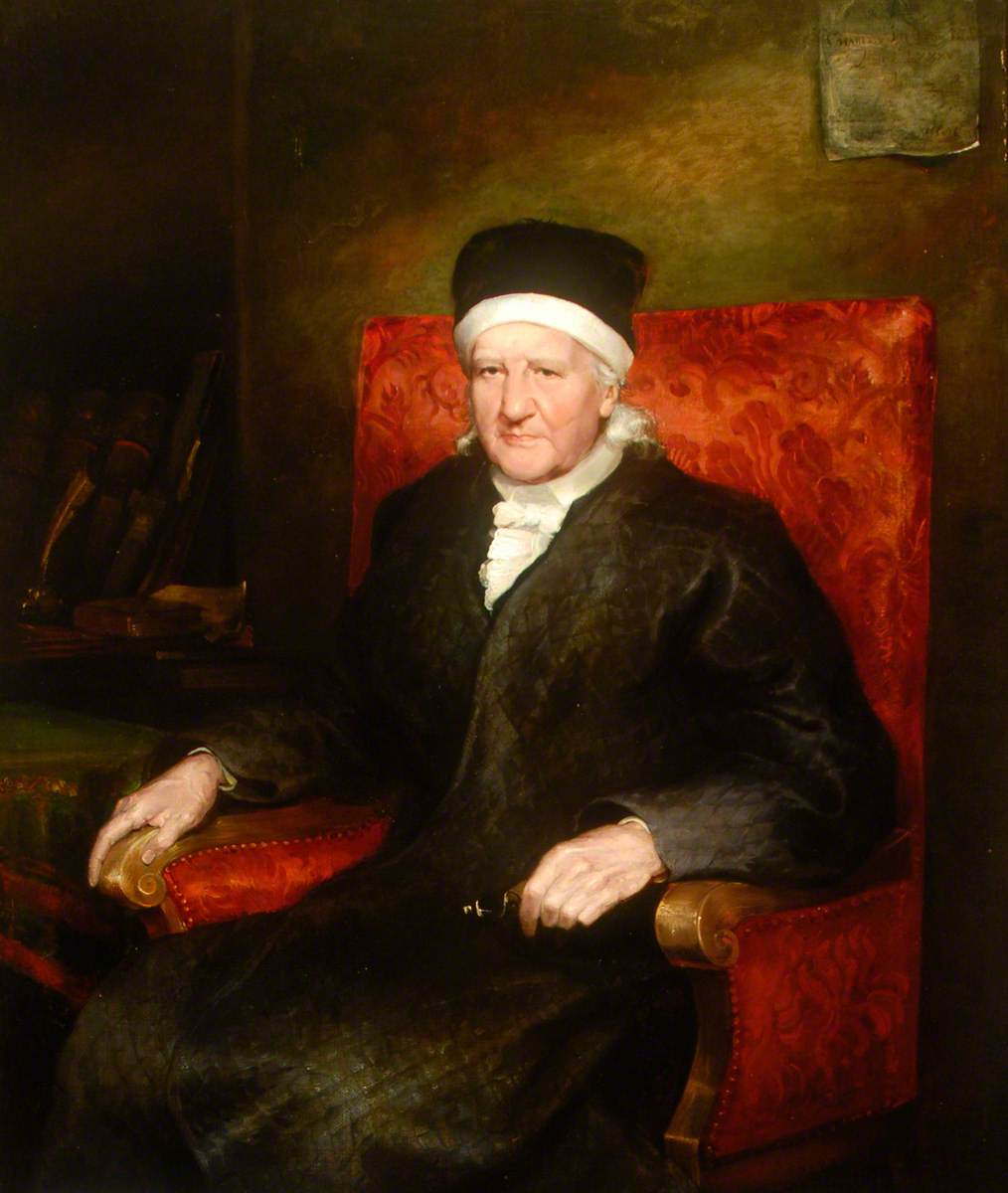
Charles Hutton by Andrew Morton

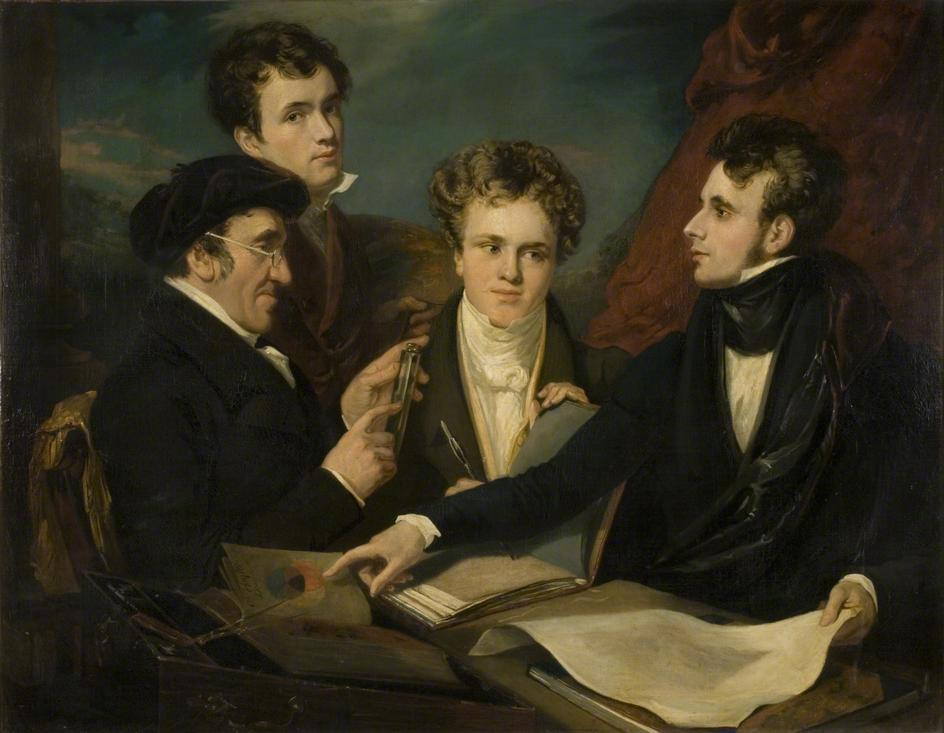
A Controversy on Colour by John Hayter

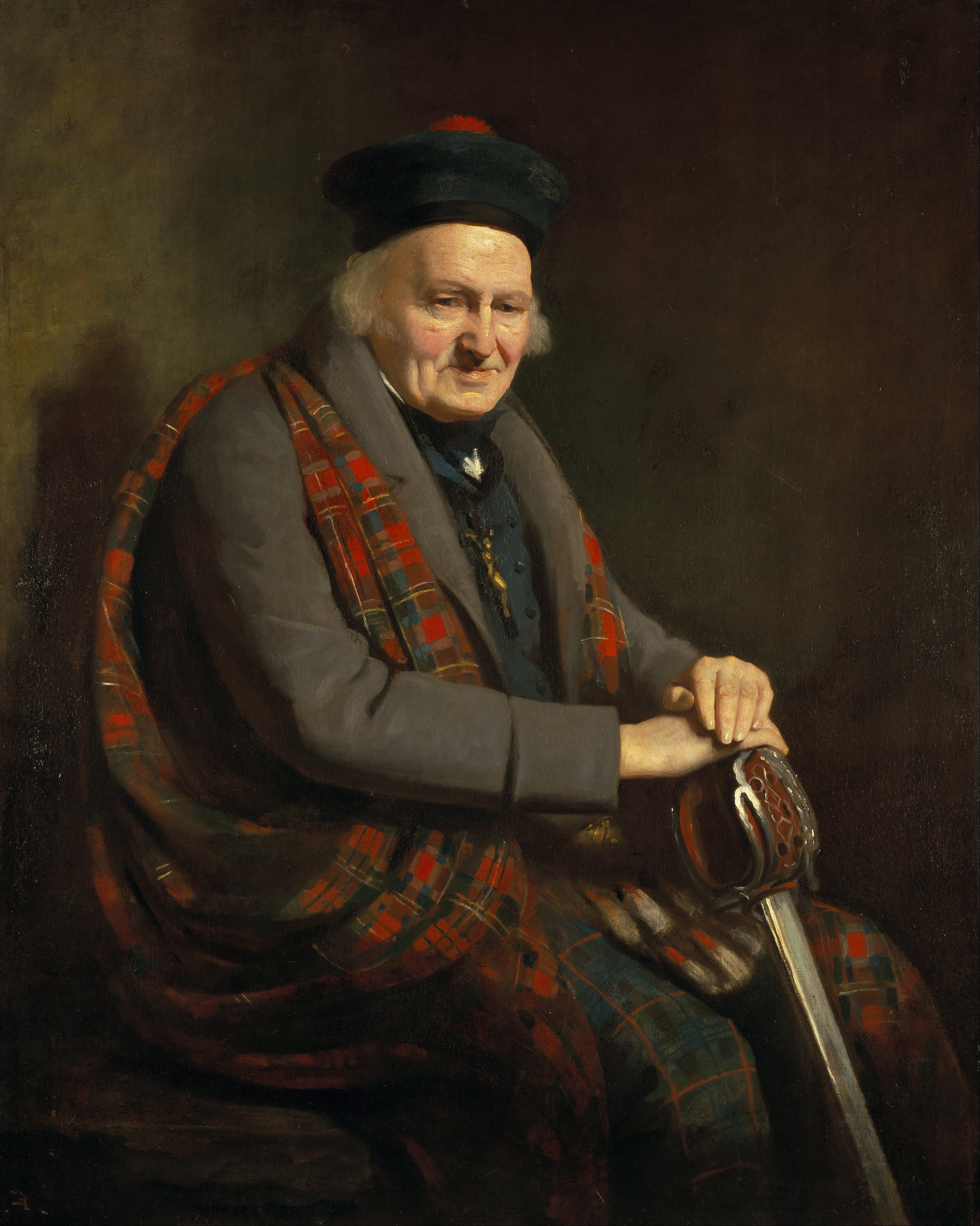
The Veteran of Culloden by Colvin Smith

Hunters and Hounds by Edwin Landseer

Lady in the Enchanted Chair by William Hilton

Rotterdam by Augustus Wall Callcott

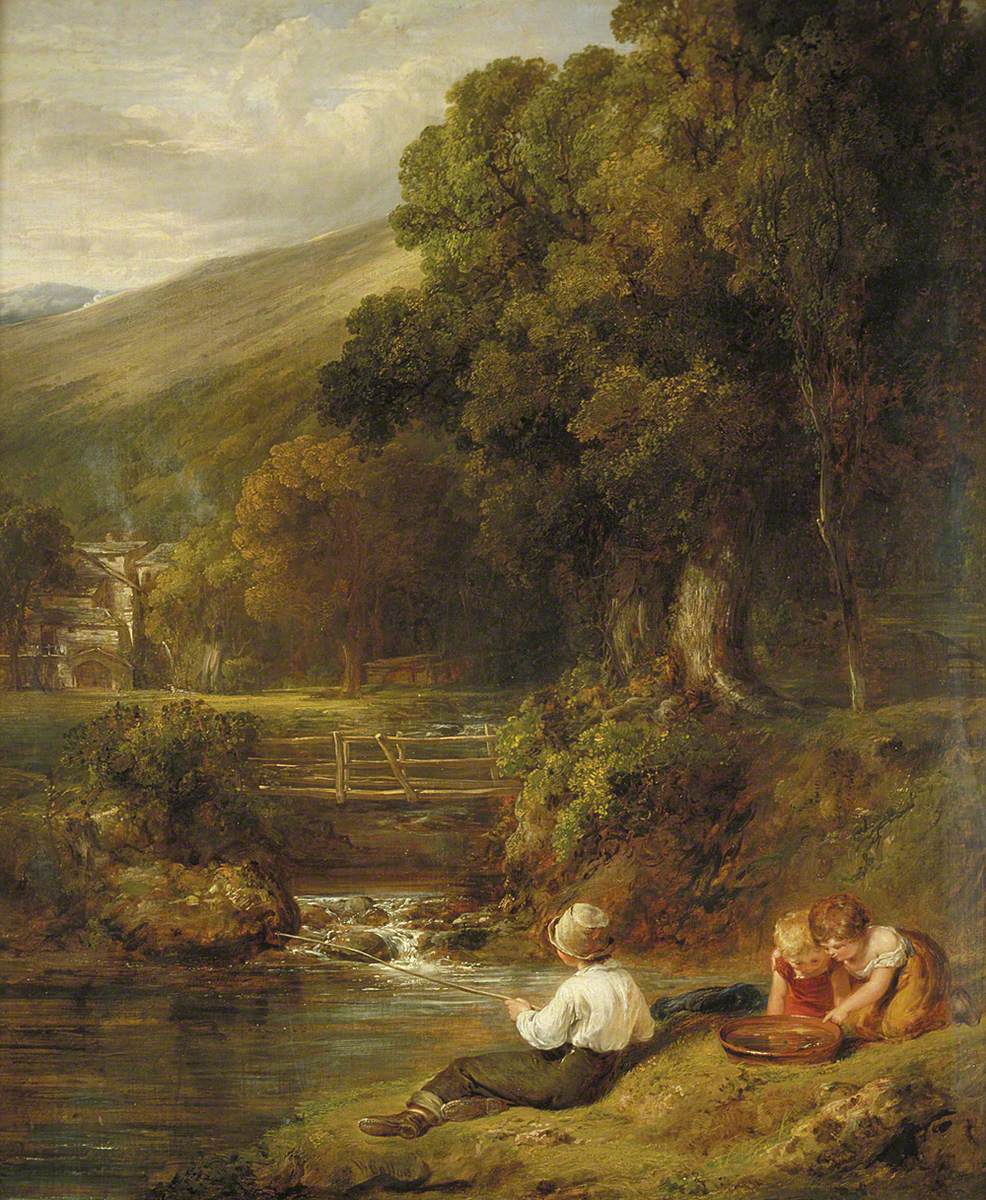
Borrowdale, Cumbria by William Collins

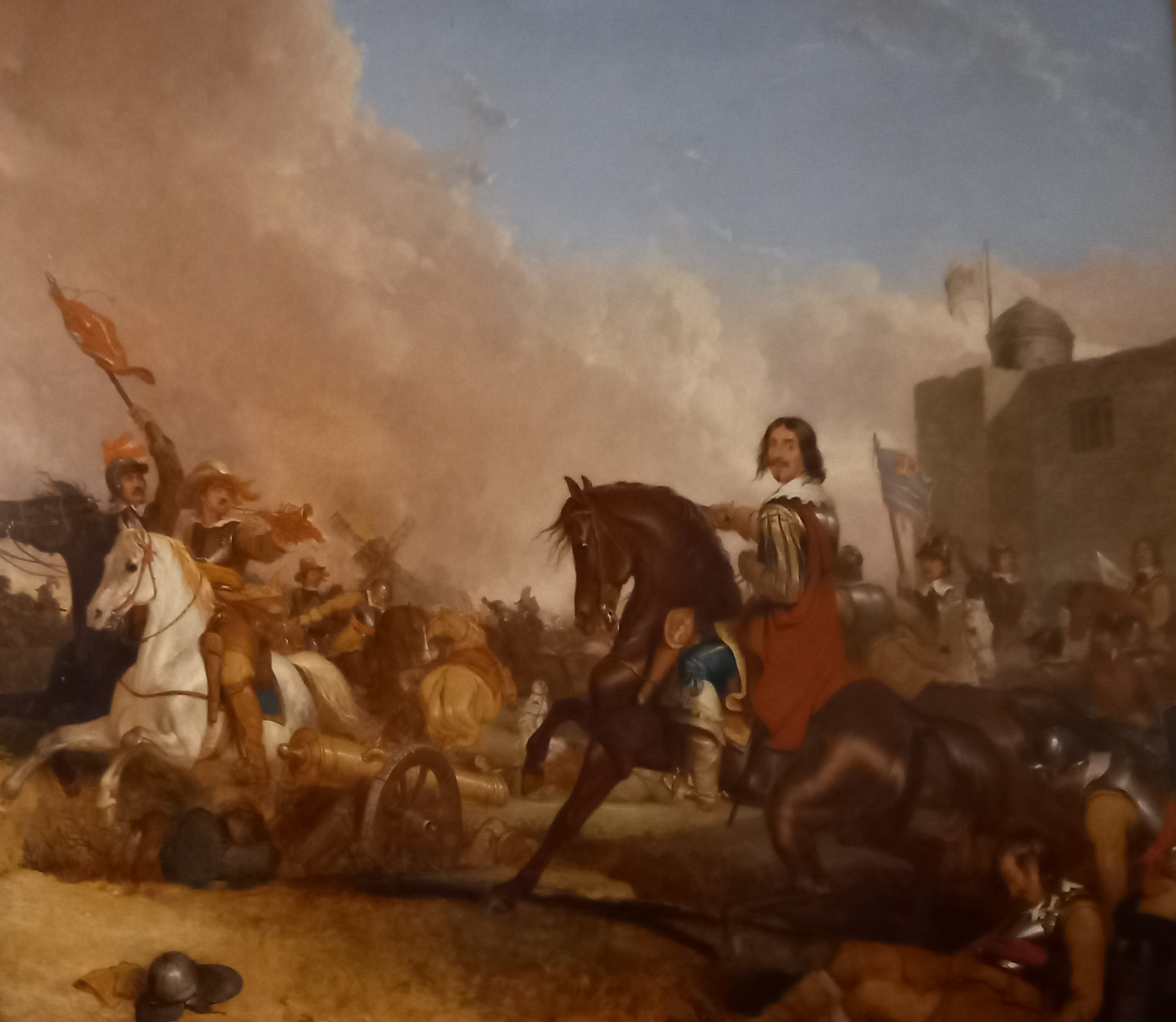
Lord Cappell at the Siege of Colchester by Abraham Cooper

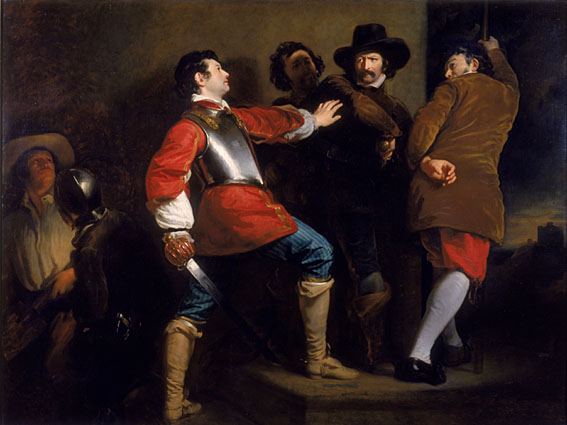
The Discovery of the Gunpowder Plot by Henry Perronet Briggs

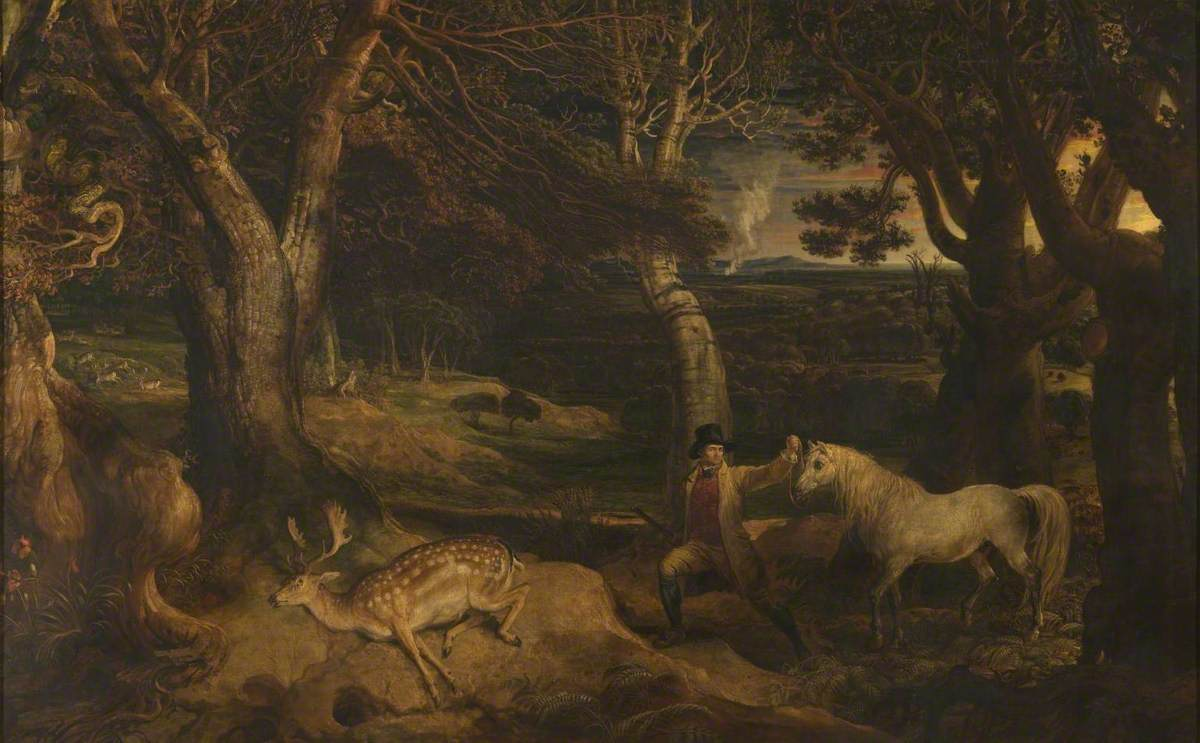
The Deer Stealer by James Ward

== Bibliography ==
- Albinson, Cassandra, Funnell, Peter & Peltz, Lucy. Thomas Lawrence: Regency Power and Brilliance. Yale University Press, 2010.
- Bailey, Anthony. J.M.W. Turner: Standing in the Sun. Tate Enterprises Ltd, 2013.
- Hamilton, James. Constable: A Portrait. Hachette UK, 2022
- Herrmann Luke. J. M. W. Turner. Oxford University Press, 2007.0
- Levey, Michael. Sir Thomas Lawrence. Yale University Press, 2005.
- Tromans, Nicholas. David Wilkie: The People's Painter. Edinburgh University Press, 2007.
