= Portrait of Frederick Robinson =

1824 painting by Thomas Lawrence

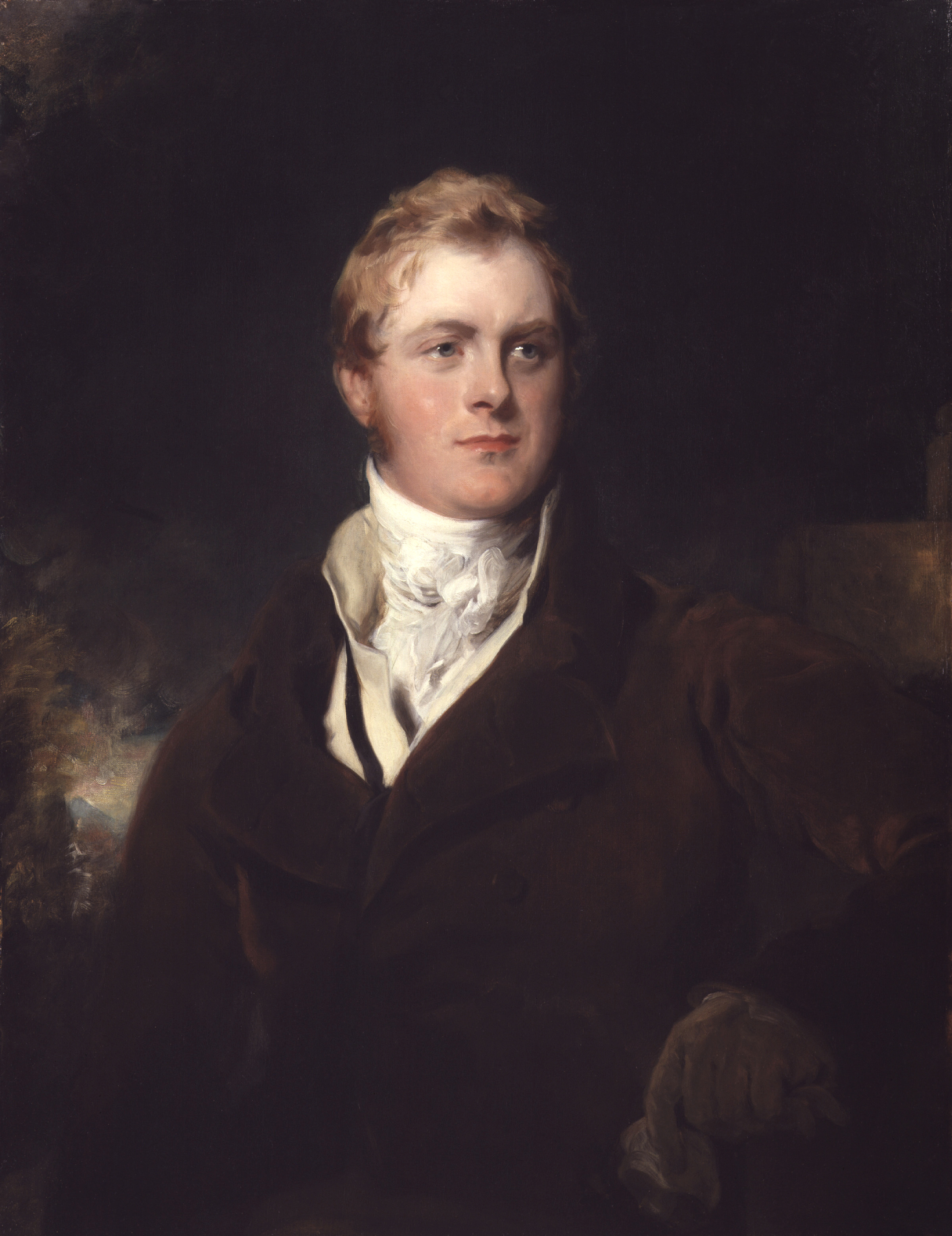
- Artist: Thomas Lawrence
- Year: c. 1824
- Medium: Oil on canvas
- Subject: Frederick Robinson
- Dimensions: 91.44 cm (36.00 in) × 71.12 cm (28.00 in)
- Location: National Portrait Gallery, London
- Accession no.: NPG 4875
- Identifiers: Art UK artwork ID: frederick-john-robinson-1st-earl-of-ripon-157129

Portrait of Frederick Robinson is an 1824 portrait painting by the English artist Sir Thomas Lawrence of the politician and member of parliament Frederick Robinson. Robinson was made Lord Goderich in 1827 and succeeded George Canning as prime minister. After his short-lived administration, he later served as War Secretary and was in 1833 elevated to Earl of Ripon. (Note: The painting has therefore also been known as Portrait of Lord Goderich and Portrait of the Earl of Ripon.) The picture was originally displayed at the Royal Academy Exhibition of 1823 at Somerset House. The painting is now in the collection of the National Portrait Gallery, London, while a print based on the portrait is now in the British Museum.

== See also ==
- Portrait of George Canning, an 1826 portrait by Lawrence of his predecessor as prime minister
