= The Discovery of the Gunpowder Plot =

Painting by Henry Perronet Briggs

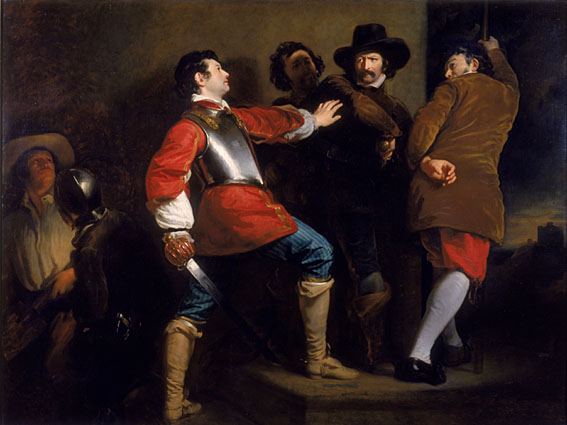
- Artist: Henry Perronet Briggs
- Year: 1823
- Type: Oil on canvas, history painting
- Dimensions: 149 cm × 199 cm (59 in × 78 in)
- Location: Laing Art Gallery, Newcastle

The Discovery of the Gunpowder Plot (or The Taking of Guy Fawkes) is an oil on canvas history painting by the British artist Henry Perronet Briggs, from 1823.

== History and description ==
It portrays the moment that the 1605 Gunpowder Plot to blow up the English Houses of Parliament was stopped. One of the plotters, Guy Fawkes, is being arrested by Sir Thomas Knevet and Edmund Doubleday.

The painting was displayed at the Royal Academy Exhibition of 1823 at Somerset House in London. Today it is in the collection of the Laing Art Gallery, in Newcastle upon Tyne, having been donated by Viscount Ridley in 1908.

== Bibliography ==
- Fraser, Antonia. The Gunpowder Plot: Terror And Faith In 1605. Hachette UK, 2010.
- Wright, Christopher, Gordon, Catherine May & Smith, Mary Peskett. British and Irish Paintings in Public Collections: An Index of British and Irish Oil Paintings by Artists Born Before 1870 in Public and Institutional Collections in the United Kingdom and Ireland. Yale University Press, 2006.
