= The Last Kiss of Romeo and Juliet =

Painting by Francesco Hayez

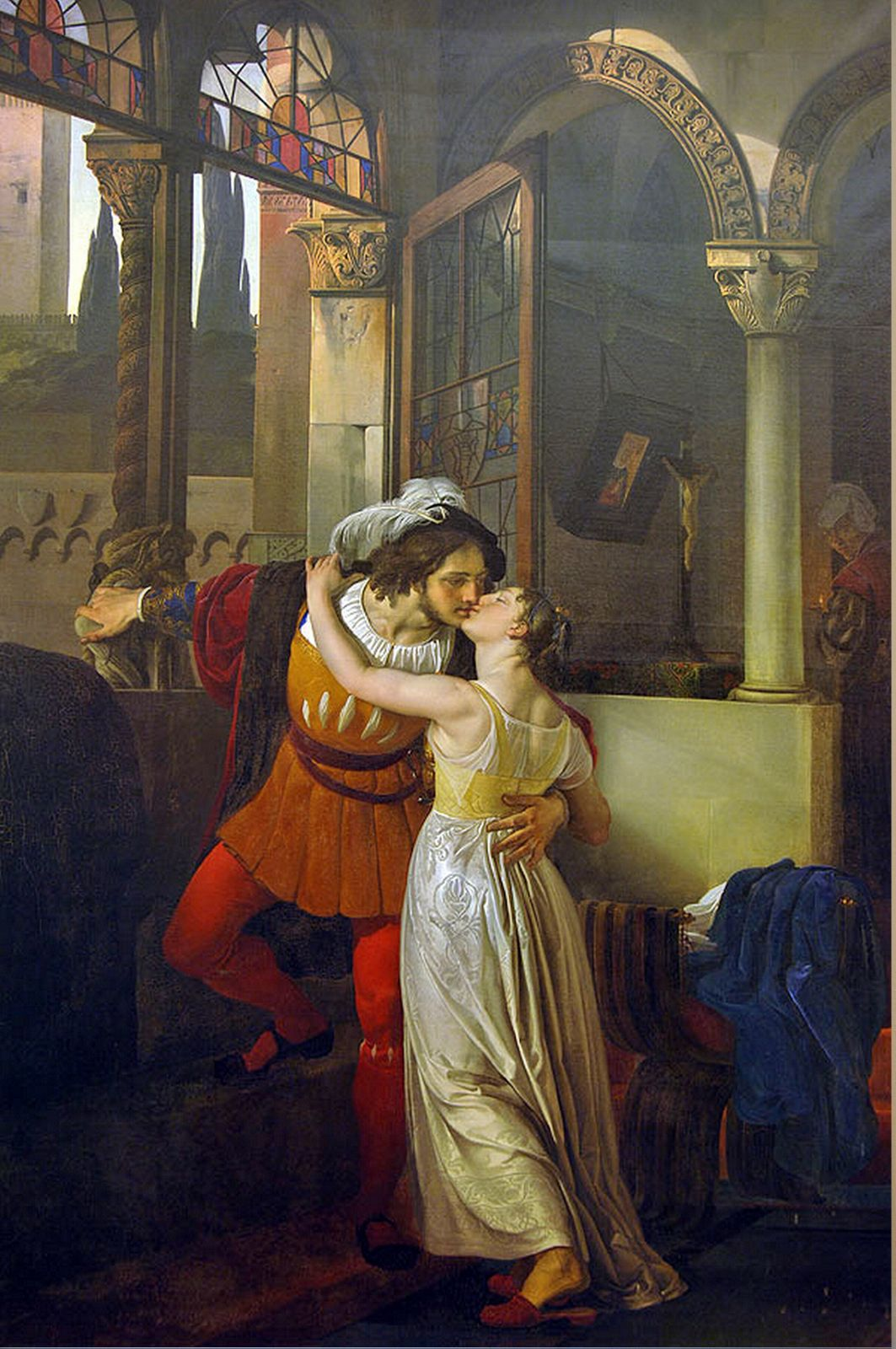
- Artist: Francesco Hayez
- Year: 1823
- Type: Oil on panel, history painting
- Dimensions: 219 cm × 201 cm (86 in × 79 in)
- Location: Pinacoteca di Brera, Milan

The Last Kiss of Romeo and Juliet (Italian: L'ultimo bacio di Romeo a Giulietta) is an 1823 oil painting by the Italian romantic artist Francesco Hayez. It was inspired as much by the 1523 novella by Luigi Da Porto as English writer William Shakespeare's 1597 play Romeo and Juliet, and was a popular success. The work was commissioned by Giovanni Battista Sommariva. It was displayed at the annual exhibition of the Pinacoteca di Brera in Milan. Today it is in the collection of the Villa Carlotta on Lake Como. Hayez also produced an 1830 painting The Marriage of Romeo and Juliet taken from Da Porto's novella.

== Bibliography ==
- Bassi, Shaul. Shakespeare’s Italy and Italy’s Shakespeare. Springer, 2016.
- Lupton, Julia Reinhard. Romeo and Juliet: A Critical Reader. Bloomsbury Publishing, 2016.
- Mazzocca, Fernando. Francesco Hayez: catalogo ragionato. F. Motta, 1994.
