= Portrait of Frederick, Duke of York (Wilkie) =

Painting by David Wilkie

Portrait of the Duke of York
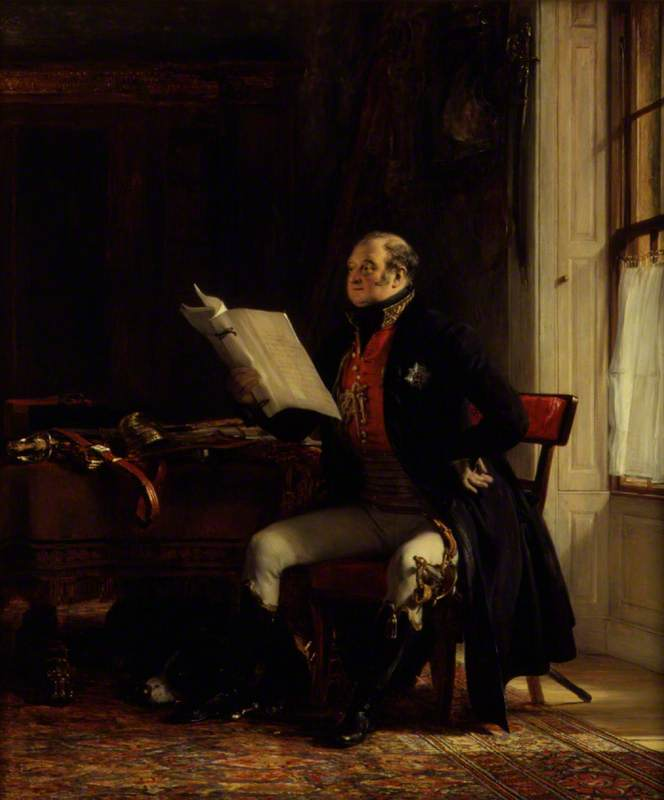
- Artist: David Wilkie
- Year: 1823
- Type: Oil on panel, portrait painting
- Dimensions: 59.1 cm × 52.1 cm (23.3 in × 20.5 in)
- Location: National Portrait Gallery, London

Portrait of Frederick, Duke of York is an 1823 portrait painting by the British artist David Wilkie. It depicts Frederick, Duke of York, the second son of George III and the long-standing Commander-in-Chief of the British Army. York was at the time heir to the throne of his brother George IV.

The painting was commissioned by James Willoughby Gordon, the Duke's Military Secretary in 1818, although work did not begin until May 1822. Wilkie was a noted genre painter of the Regency era, who enjoyed great success with his Chelsea Pensioners reading the Waterloo Dispatch that year, but also produced occasional portraits Although the sittings took place at Wilkie's studio in Kensington, the Duke is shown at the desk in his study at York House. The work was displayed at the Royal Academy Exhibition of 1823 at Somerset House. Today it is in the collection of the National Portrait Gallery on Trafalgar Square, having been acquired in 1938.

== See also ==
- Portrait of Prince Frederick, Duke of York, 1816 painting by Thomas Lawrence

== Bibliography ==
- Priestley, John Boynton. The Prince of Pleasure and His Regency, 1811-20. Harper & Row, 1969.
- Tromans, Nicholas. David Wilkie: The People's Painter. Edinburgh University Press, 2007.
