= The Deer Stealer =

Painting by James Ward

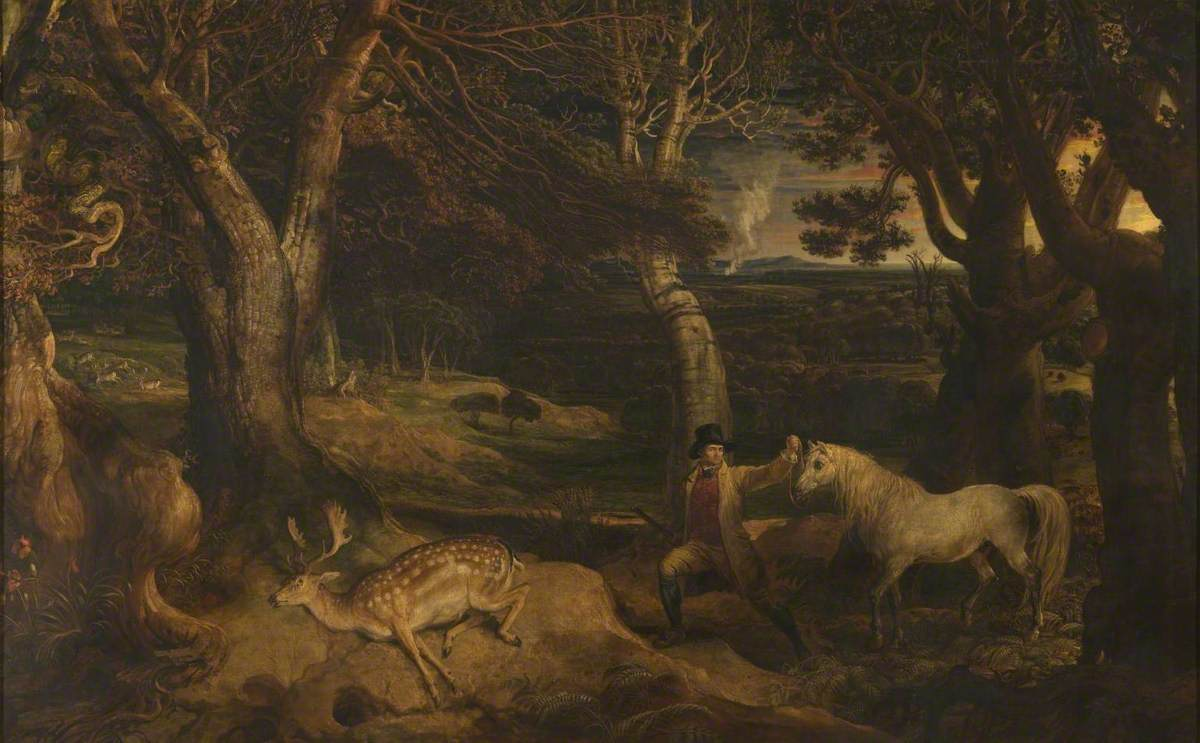
- Artist: James Ward
- Year: 1823
- Type: Oil on canvas, landscape painting
- Dimensions: 366.4 cm × 228.9 cm (144.3 in × 90.1 in)
- Location: Tate Britain, London

The Deer Stealer is an oil painting on canvas by the English artist James Ward, from 1823. It is held at the Tate Britain, in London.

== History and description ==
Combining landscape and genre painting, it depicts a poacher in a forest scene, accompanied by a white horse and a dead deer that he had just shot. The painting implies a strong criticism of illegal hunting. It was commissioned for five hundred guineas but the owner, Theophilus Levett, was so delighted with the final work that he instead paid him six hundred, the highest Ward ever received for a private commission.

It was exhibited at the Royal Academy's Summer Exhibition of 1823 at Somerset House. Today it is in the collection of Tate Britain, having been acquired in 1950.

An 1820 pencil study for the poacher, depicting him in great detail, which was effectively lost in the final version due to its large scale, is in the Yale Center for British Art, in New Haven.

== Bibliography ==
- Beckett, Oliver. The Life and Work of James Ward, R.A., 1769-1859: The Forgotten Genius. Book Guild, 1995.
- Davidson, Hilary. Dress in the Age of Jane Austen: Regency Fashion. Yale University Press, 2019.
- Fussell, George Edwin. James Ward R.A.: Animal Painter, 1769-1859, and His England. Michael Joseph, 1974.
- Walker, Stella A. Sporting Art: England 1700-1900. Studio Vista, 1972.
