= Portrait of DeWitt Clinton =

Painting by Rembrandt Peale

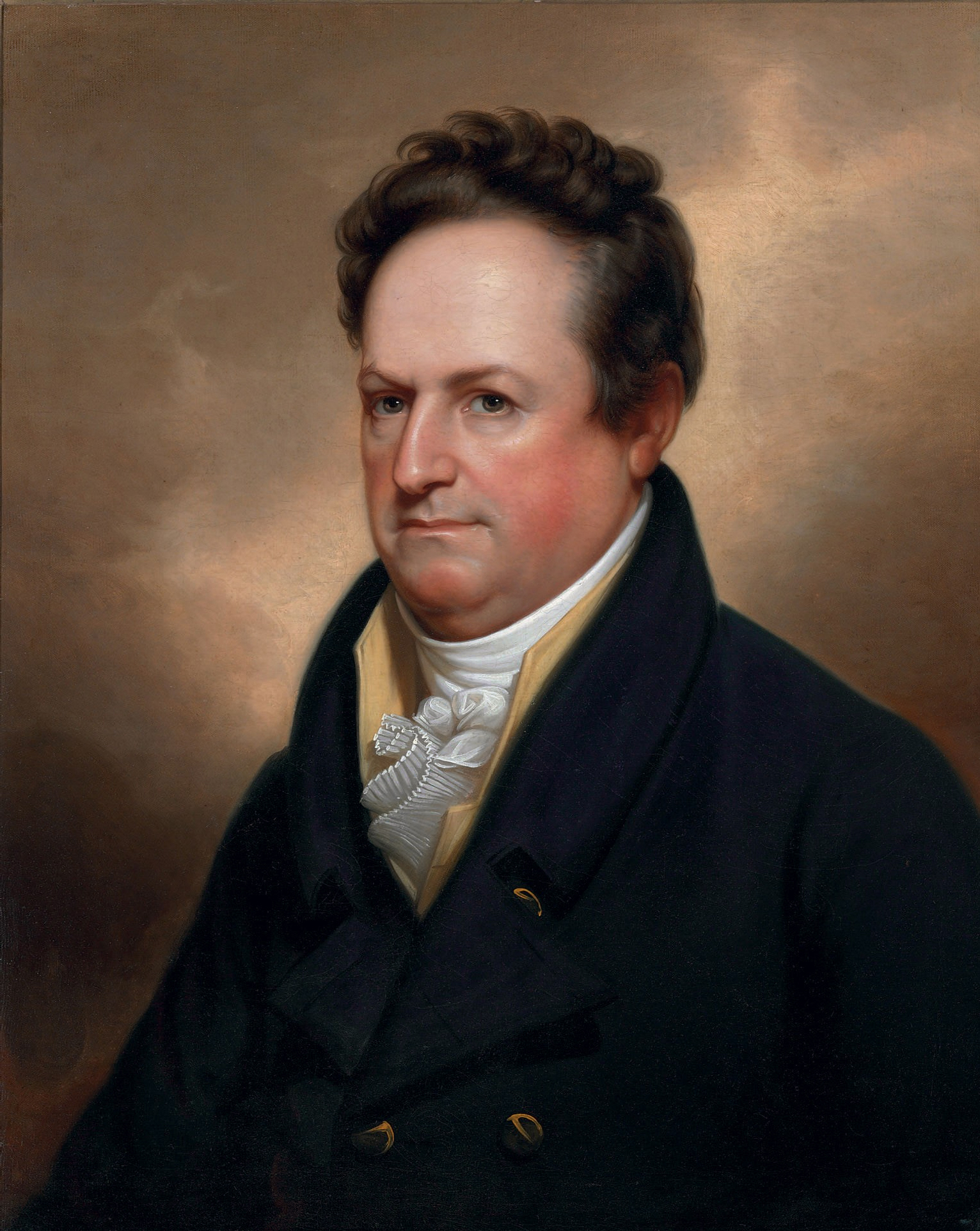
- Artist: Rembrandt Peale
- Year: 1823
- Type: Oil on canvas, portrait painting
- Dimensions: 112.4 cm × 91.1 cm (44.3 in × 35.9 in)
- Location: Private collection

Portrait of DeWitt Clinton is an 1823 portrait painting of by the American artist Rembrandt Peale. It depicts the politician DeWitt Clinton who served as Mayor of New York City three times as well as Governor of New York twice, noted for the construction of the Erie Canal. He was also a member of the US Senate and in 1812 ran for the Presidency as a Federalist, losing to incumbent James Madison. The election took place against the backdrop of the War of 1812 and the Invasion of Canada.

Clinton was also painted by Samuel Morse in 1826, a portrait that is now in the collection of the Metropolitan Museum of Art.

== Bibliography ==
- Miller, Lillian B. & Hevner, Carol Eaton. In Pursuit of Fame: Rembrandt Peale, 1778-1860. National Portrait Gallery, 1992.
- Zinman, Donald A. America’s First Wartime Election: James Madison, DeWitt Clinton, and the War of 1812. University Press of Kansas, 2024.
