= The Parish Beadle =

Painting by David Wilkie

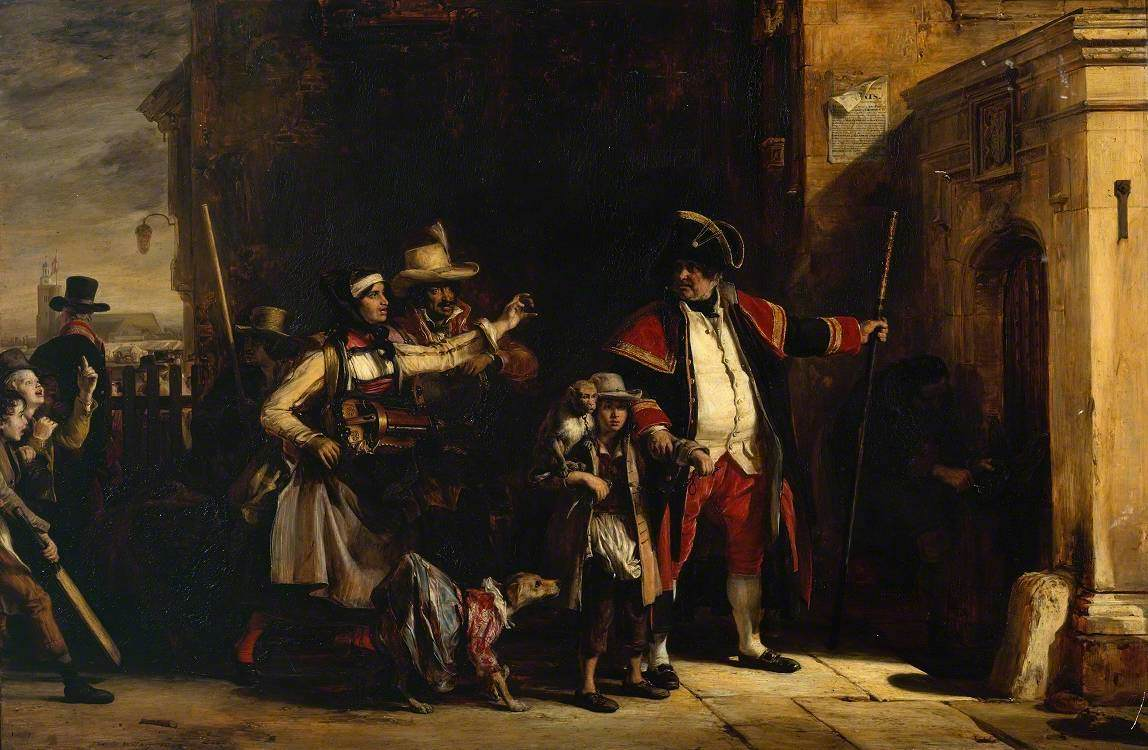
- Artist: David Wilkie
- Year: 1823
- Type: Oil on canvas, genre painting
- Dimensions: 89.5 cm × 55.7 cm (35.2 in × 21.9 in)
- Location: Tate Britain, London

The Parish Beadle is an 1823 genre painting by the Scottish artist David Wilkie. It is held in the Tate Britain, in London.

== History and description ==
It depicts a comically overzealous parish beadle taking a troupe of travelling Savoyard entertainers into custody for vagrancy. They had evidently been performing at the fair seen in the distance which echoes of William Hogarth's Southwark Fair.

It was commissioned by the art collector Lord Colbourne. Wilkie was known for his genre scenes of ordinary life such as The Penny Wedding. Wilkie took great care to make sure that the various figures and costumes were correct. It was exhibited at the Royal Academy's Summer Exhibition in 1823. A later portrait of Colbourne by John Partridge features Wilkie's painting in the background.

The work parodied the often archaic and draconian penalties still in force in the Regency era and the chaotic means of law enforcement before the creation of a professional police force in 1829. The Tory politician Robert Peel, a reforming home secretary and future prime minister, was impressed by the painting but was unable to acquire it. He instead commissioned a different work from the artist that was shown at the Royal Academy in 1824.

== Provenance ==
The painting was donated to the National Gallery by Colbourne in 1854. It is now held at the collection of Tate Britain.

== Bibliography ==
- Solkin, David H. Painting Out of the Ordinary: Modernity and the Art of Everyday Life in Early Nineteenth-century Britain. Yale University Press, 2009.
- Tromans, Nicholas. David Wilkie: The People's Painter. Edinburgh University Press, 2007.
