= The Bay of Baiae, with Apollo and the Sibyl =

Painting by J. M. W. Turner

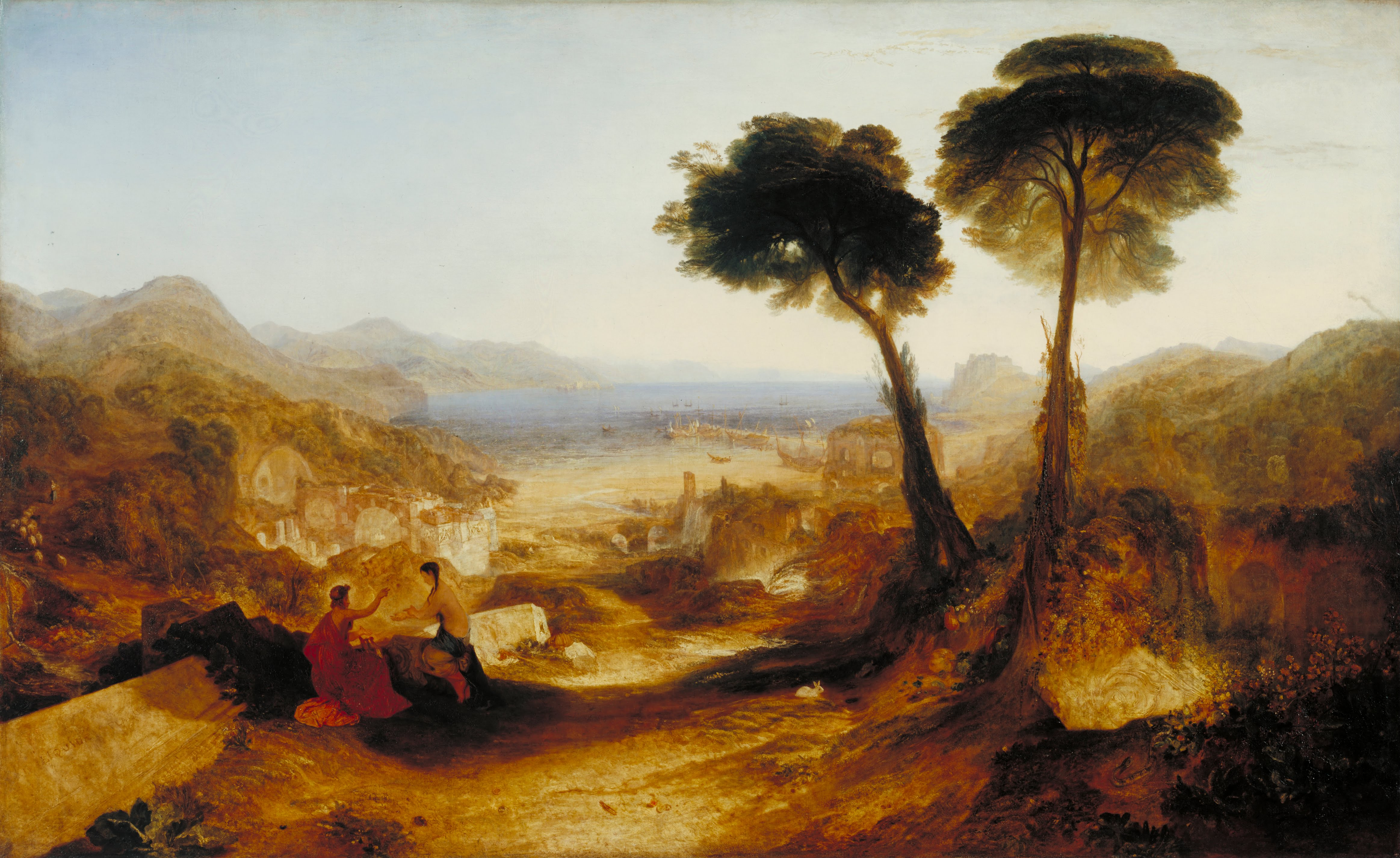
- Artist: J. M. W. Turner
- Year: 1823
- Type: Oil on canvas, landscape
- Dimensions: 145.4 cm × 237.5 cm (57.2 in × 93.5 in)
- Location: Tate Britain, London
- Website: www.tate.org.uk/...n00505

The Bay of Baiae, with Apollo and the Sibyl is an 1823 landscape painting by the British artist J.M.W. Turner. It shows a view of the Bay of Baiae in the Gulf of Naples. Combining genres, it also features the Cumaean Sibyl encountering the god Apollo in the foreground. Turner had sketched Baiae during his 1819 visit to Italy, and this provided the basis for this work produced in London.

The painting was displayed at the Royal Academy's 1823 Summer Exhibition at Somerset House. It was exhibited with a quote from Odes by the Roman writer Horace. It was the subject of controversy at the time and even Turner's later supporter John Ruskin thought the use of colours was crude. Today it is in the collection of the Tate Britain in Pimlico, having been acquired by the nation as part of the Turner Bequest in 1856.

== See also ==
- List of paintings by J. M. W. Turner

== Bibliography ==
- Bailey, Anthony. J.M.W. Turner: Standing in the Sun. Tate Enterprises Ltd, 2013.
- Beckett, R.B. John Constable and the Fishers: The Record of a Friendship. Taylor & Francis, 2023.
- Costello, Leo. J.M.W. Turner and the Subject of History. Taylor and Francis, 2017.
- Herrmann Luke. J. M. W. Turner. Oxford University Press, 2007
- Shanes, Eric. The Life and Masterworks of J.M.W. Turner. Parkstone International, 2012.
- Vance, Norman. The Victorians and Ancient Rome. John Wiley & Sons, 1997.
