= Salisbury Cathedral from the Bishop's Grounds =

Painting by John Constable

- Artist: John Constable
- Year: 1823
- Medium: Oil on canvas
- Dimensions: 87.6 cm × 111.8 cm (34.5 in × 44.0 in)
- Location: Victoria & Albert Museum, London

Salisbury Cathedral from the Bishop's Grounds is an 1823 landscape painting by the English landscape painter John Constable (1776–1837). This image of Salisbury Cathedral, one of England's most famous medieval churches, is one of his most celebrated works, and was commissioned by one of his closest friends, John Fisher, The Bishop of Salisbury. The prime version from 1823 of the painting has been in the collection of the Victoria & Albert Museum in London since its was given as part of the Sheepshanks Gift in 1857.

Constable painted other versions of this composition, as well as other treatments of the cathedral, and it has been reproduced in print form in various techniques.

== The first version ==
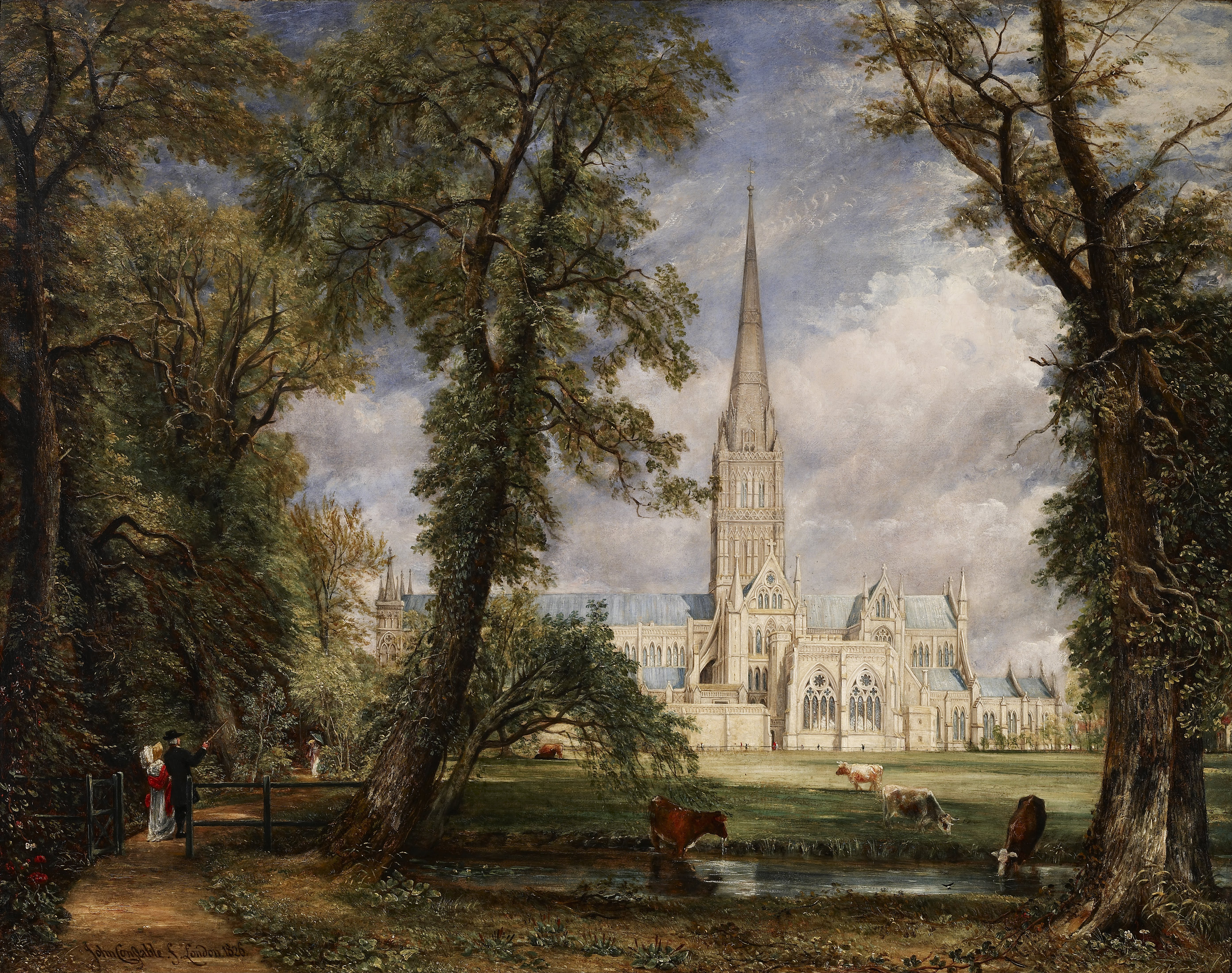
Salisbury Cathedral from the Bishop's Grounds, 1825, Frick Collection

Constable visited Salisbury in 1811 and made a series of sketches of the cathedral, from the south-east, the south-west and from the east end. The artist selected a viewpoint from the bishop's garden (the south-east) and returned in 1820 to make further drawings and an open-air oil sketch, now in the National Gallery of Canada in Ottawa, which served as the model for the London version. Included in the paintings are figures of Dr. Fisher and his wife at the bottom left. Following the exhibition of the London version at the 1823 Royal Academy, Constable observed: "My Cathedral looks very well....It was the most difficult subject in Landscape I ever had upon my Easel. I have not flinched at the work of the windows, buttresses, &c. – but I have as usual made my escape in the Evanescence of the Chiaro-Oscuro". His patron took exception to the dark cloud over the cathedral, and when he commissioned a smaller replica, requested "a more serene sky".

== Other versions by Constable ==
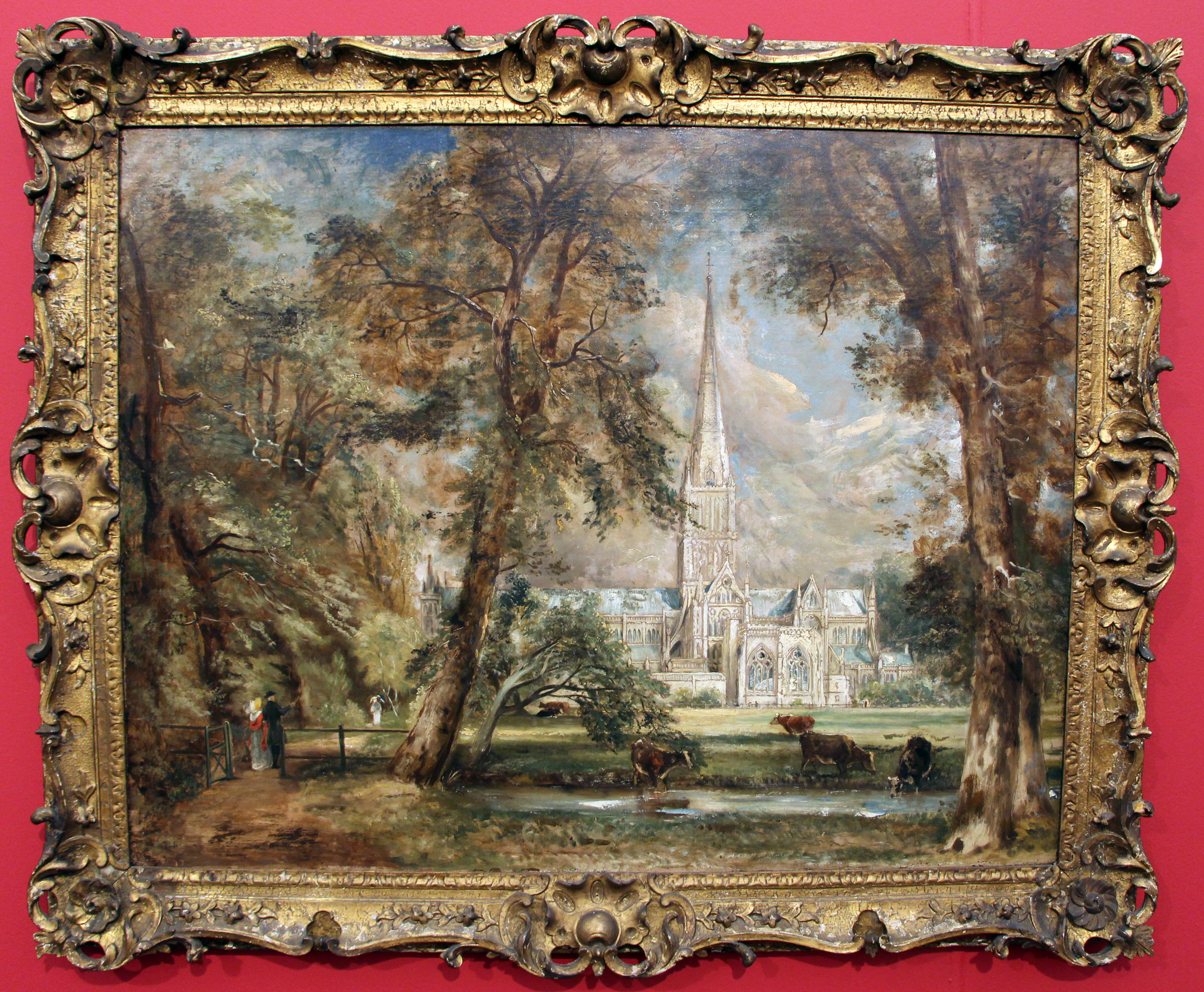
Salisbury Cathedral from the Bishop's Grounds, 1821–22, 89 cm × 114 cm (35 in × 45 in), São Paulo Museum of Art

There is a full-scale version in the Frick Collection in New York City. It is slightly different in that it shows different weather and hence light. Whereas the London version depicts the cathedral with an overcast sky, the version in the Frick shows the cathedral with a clear, bright sky. It was executed in 1825 after Fisher requested, in a letter, that Constable repaint the sky in the London version. Fisher died before Constable completed the work. A full-scale study for the Frick version is currently held at the Metropolitan Museum of Art.

There is an earlier, homonymous version (1821–1822) of this painting at São Paulo Museum of Art in São Paulo. This is an early oil sketch for the London version.

Another, small version of the painting, measuring 62.9 × 75.9 cm, executed between 1823 and 1826, is now in the Huntington Library in San Marino, California. This smaller, sunnier version was painted for John Fisher as a wedding present for his daughter, Elizabeth.

Constable painted many different views of Salisbury Cathedral during his career, including Salisbury Cathedral and Leadenhall from the River Avon (1820) and more famously Salisbury Cathedral from the Meadows (1831).

== See also ==
- List of paintings by John Constable
- Salisbury Cathedral from the Meadows
- 100 Great Paintings, 1980 BBC series

== Bibliography ==
- Jackson, Anna, ed. (2001). V&A: A Hundred Highlights. V&A Publications.
